= Drew, Oregon =

Unincorporated community in the state of Oregon, United States

Coordinates: 42°52′54″N 122°53′58″W

Drew is an unincorporated community in Douglas County, Oregon, United States. It is located about six miles south of Tiller and 21 miles north of Trail on Oregon Route 227, surrounded by the Umpqua National Forest.

Drew was probably named after Robert Drew, a local resident. Drew post office was established in 1902 and discontinued in 1971. In 1915 the community had a public school, and the nearest railroad point was 32 miles away in Riddle. As of 1990 there were only a few houses. Drew has a general store and a museum in the former Tison School building, built of logs in 1906.

At one time Drew's economy was based primarily on logging, but in a 2006 study, the federal government identified the Milo-Tiller-Drew area as a "community of concern" because of the negative impact the Northwest Forest Plan had on it.
