= Train Mountain Railroad =

Miniature railroad in Oregon, United States

Coordinates: 42.56°N 121.89°W

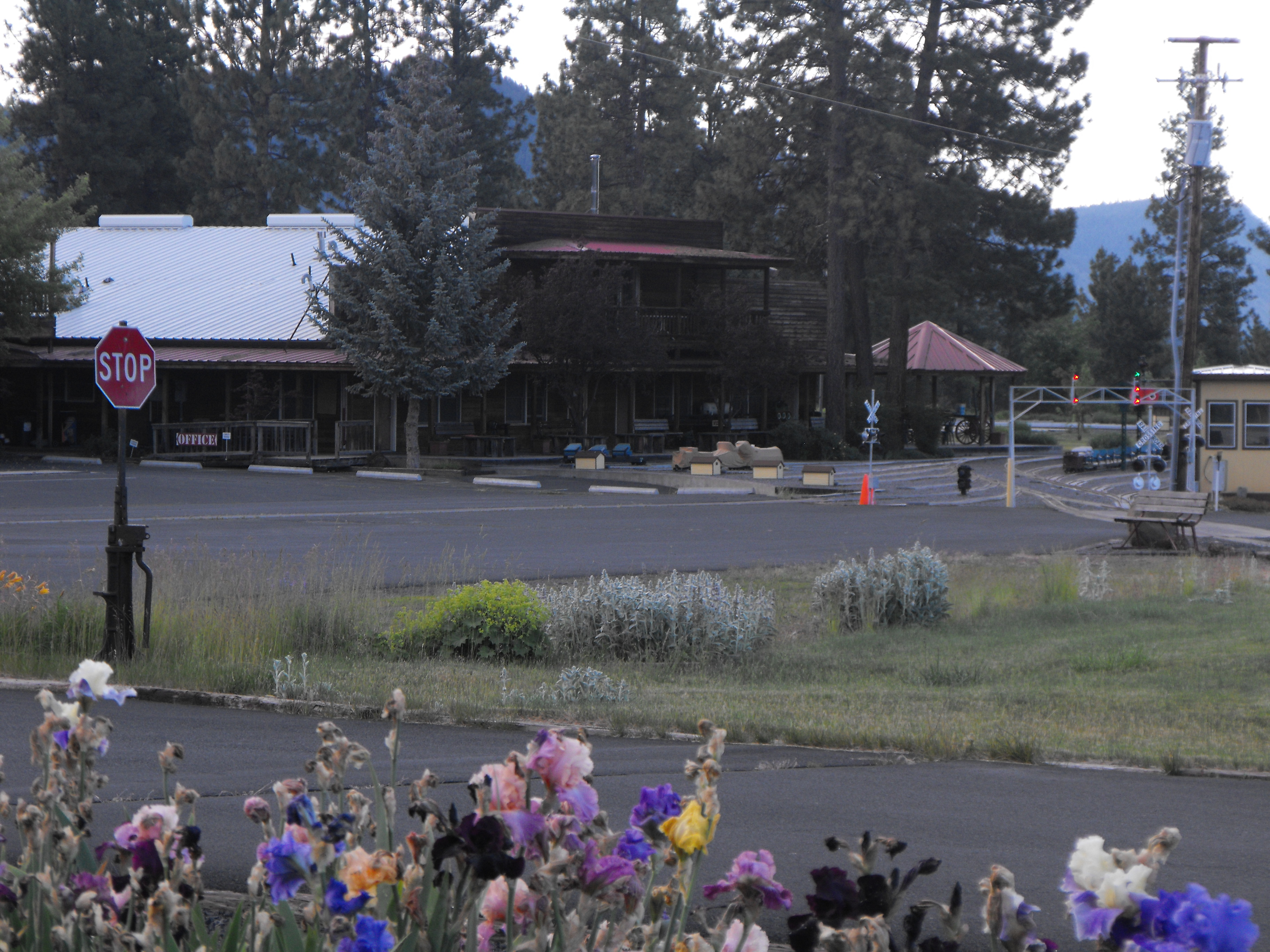
Central Station

Train Mountain Railroad is the world's largest miniature hobbyist railroad. It is located near Chiloquin, Oregon, United States. It is situated between Klamath Falls, Oregon, approximately 26 miles (42 km) to the south, and Crater Lake National Park to the north.

== Geography ==
The 2,205-acre (892 ha) property borders Highway 97 on the east side, Highway 62 (Crater Lake Highway) on the west side, and Highway 422 on the north. The track and facilities which are not obscured by trees are clearly visible on public satellite images.

The elevation at Train Mountain varies from 4,200 feet (1,300 m) at South Meadow, 4,293 feet (1,309 m) at Central Station, 4,406 feet (1,343 m) at Ward Passing Track (the highest point accessible by train), to 4,780 feet (1,460 m) at Steiger Butte, the highest point on Train Mountain property.

== Longest miniature hobby railroad ==
In the 2004 Guinness World Records, Train Mountain is recognized as the “Longest Miniature Hobby Railroad”. At the time Train Mountain was recognized by Guinness, it was reported to have 69,900 feet (13.24 mi; 21.3 km) of 7 1/2 in (190.5 mm) gauge mainline track and 133,250 feet (25.237 mi; 40.61 km) of total track including yards, sidings, spurs, and connector tracks. During the following years, approximately 10 additional miles (16 km) of new track has been added.

== Gauge and scale ==
The Train Mountain 7 1/2 in (190.5 mm) gauge miniature railway track is typically used for 1.5" scale trains (1.5" to 12" or approx. 1/8 scale). Trains of 2.5" scale (2.5" to 12", or approx. 1/5 scale) are also common at Train Mountain. Some of these 2.5" scale steam locomotives can weigh in excess of 3,500 pounds (1,600 kg) for the engine and tender when fully loaded with water and fuel.

== Live steam ==
Train Mountain is well known to members of the live steam hobby, many of whom visit regularly from all over the world.

Live Steam Trains at Train Mountain Railroad and K&W Railroad
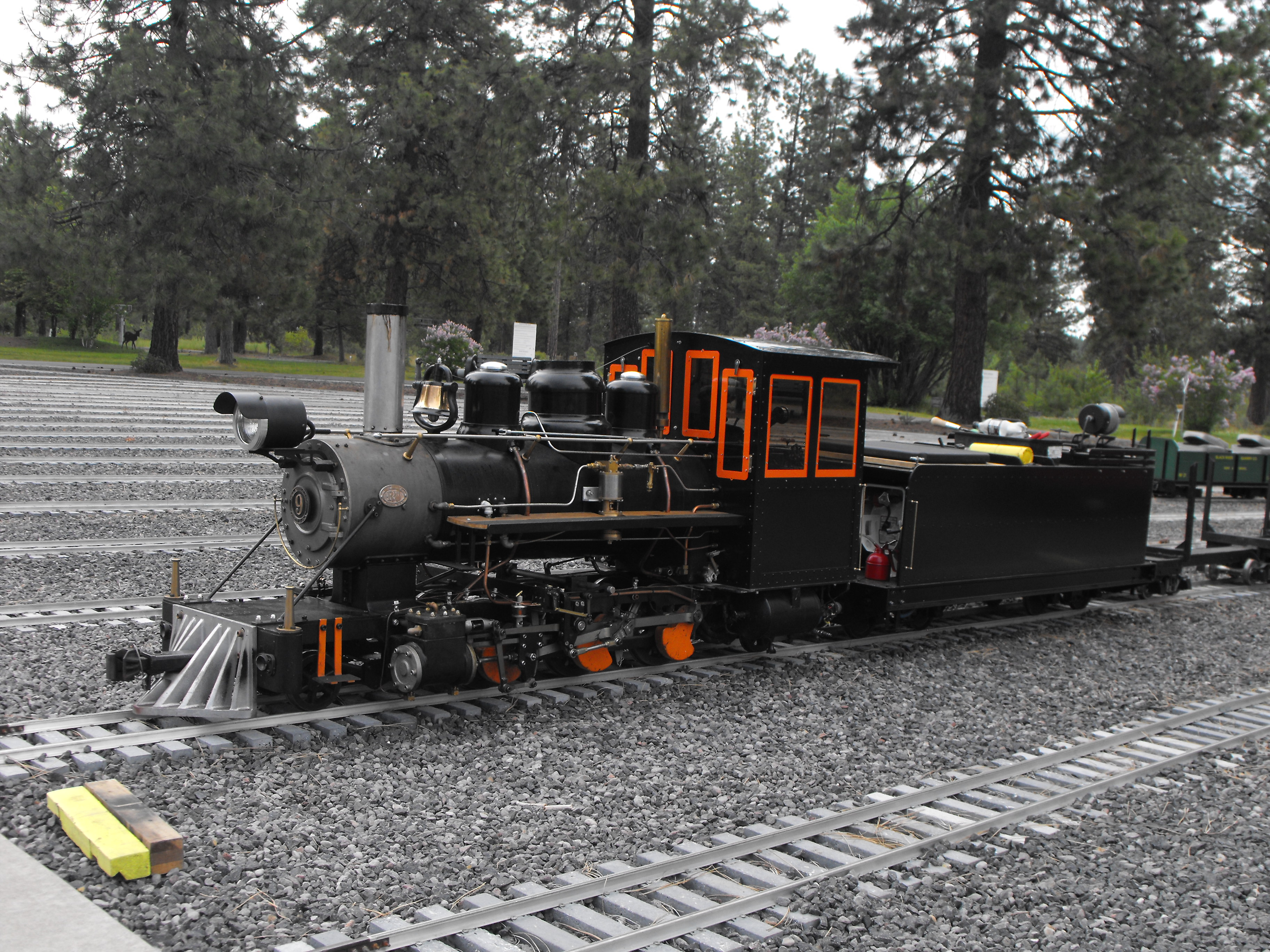
Live Steamer at Crisp Yard

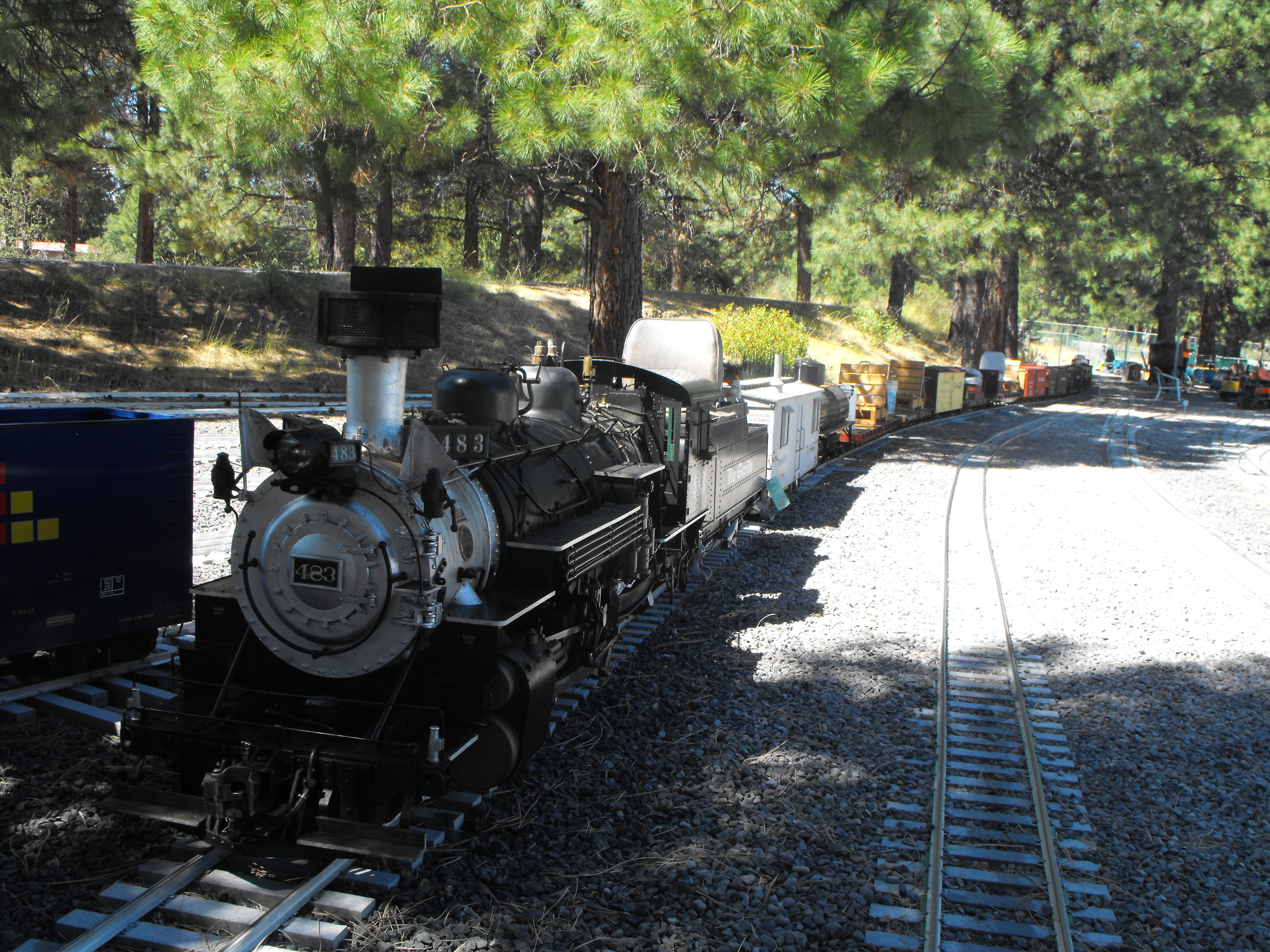
Live Steamer on K&W track

== Media coverage ==
In 2005, Train Mountain was featured on the Oregon Public Broadcasting (OPB) program Oregon Field Guide (S17 E06), in an episode entitled "The Dream" and also known as "Burrowing Shrimp, Train Mountain, Taylor's Checkerspot Butterfly". The title was in reference to Train Mountain's late founder, Quentin Breen, whose dream was to build the railroad at Train Mountain, as explained in the video.

In the fall of 2017, OPB featured Train Mountain a second time on Oregon Field Guide (S29 E06), in an episode entitled "Train Mountain, Big River Tug, Horse Logger".

== Garden railway ==
A garden railway in G Scale has been in the process of being constructed at Train Mountain on approximately 4 acres (1.6 ha) in the center of a 7 1/2 in (190.5 mm) gauge miniature railway track circle known as Midway Circle. Midway Circle is one of several such circles, which are essentially roundabouts.

== Train Mountain Railroad Museum ==
Train Mountain Railroad Museum also exists on the Train Mountain property, and consists of antique full-size railroad rolling stock and artifacts which are on display. One of the most notable is the 100-short-ton (91,000 kg) antique, diesel-electric (originally steam-powered) rotary snowplow, Southern Pacific MW206, built by ALCo (Cooke) in November 1923 with serial number #65353, that was used to remove snow from the tracks between Klamath Falls and Eugene, Oregon. The rotary snowplow was moved to Train Mountain on November 16, 2008.

In August 2024, the museum site would receive Weyerhaeuser Timber Company #101, a Baldwin DS-4-4-750 that was built in May 1950 as one of two demonstrator units for the Baldwin Locomotive Works. It would later serve Weyerhaeuser and the company-owned Oregon, California and Eastern Railway until the railway ceased operations in May 1990. After that, it was privately owned and later had its ownership transferred to the Oregon Coast Scenic Railroad before being sold to Train Mountain and arriving at the site. It is notable for being Train Mountain's first full-size display locomotive.

Antique Railroad Equipment at Train Mountain Railroad Museum
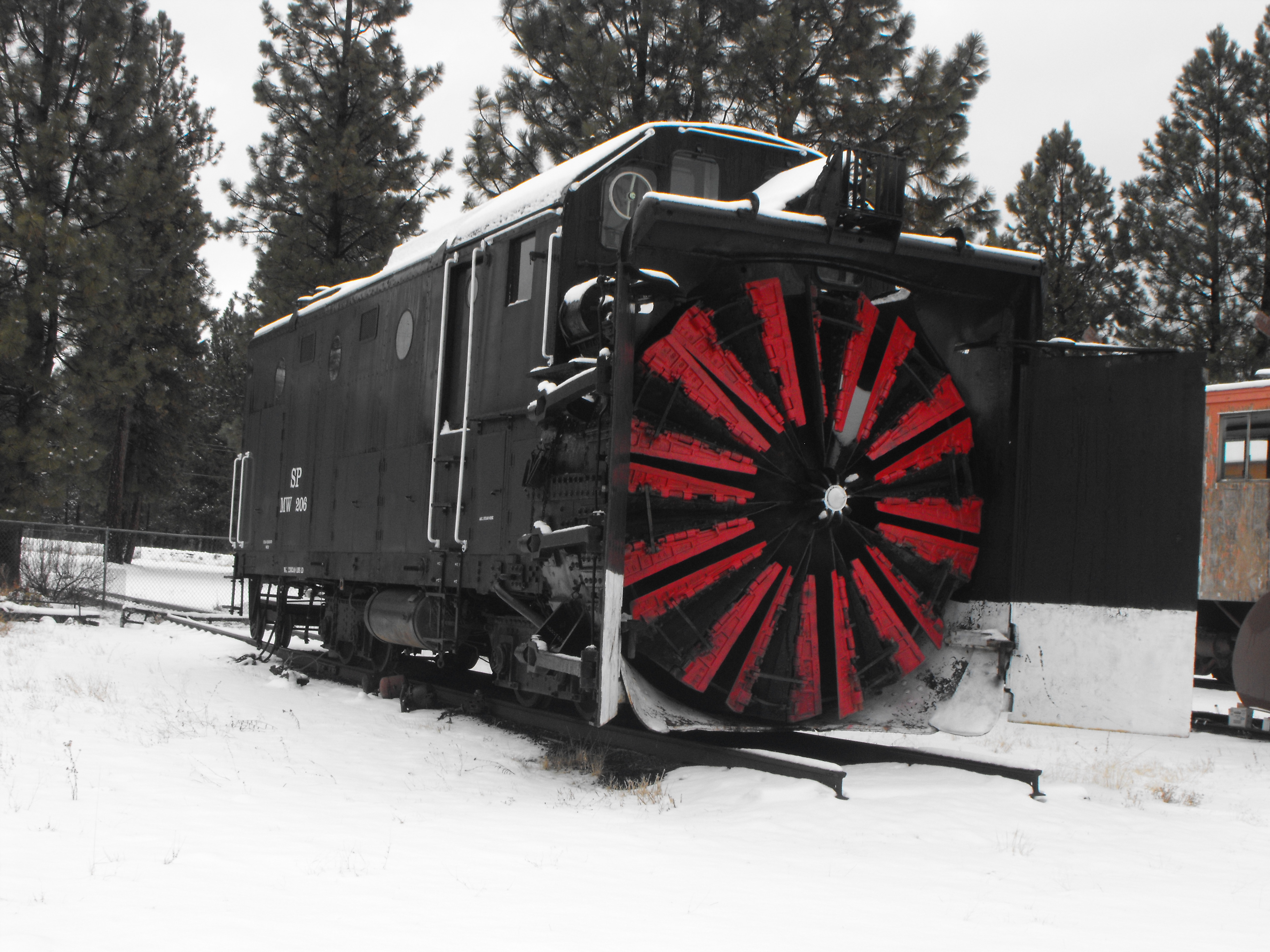
SP MW206 Rotary Snow Plow

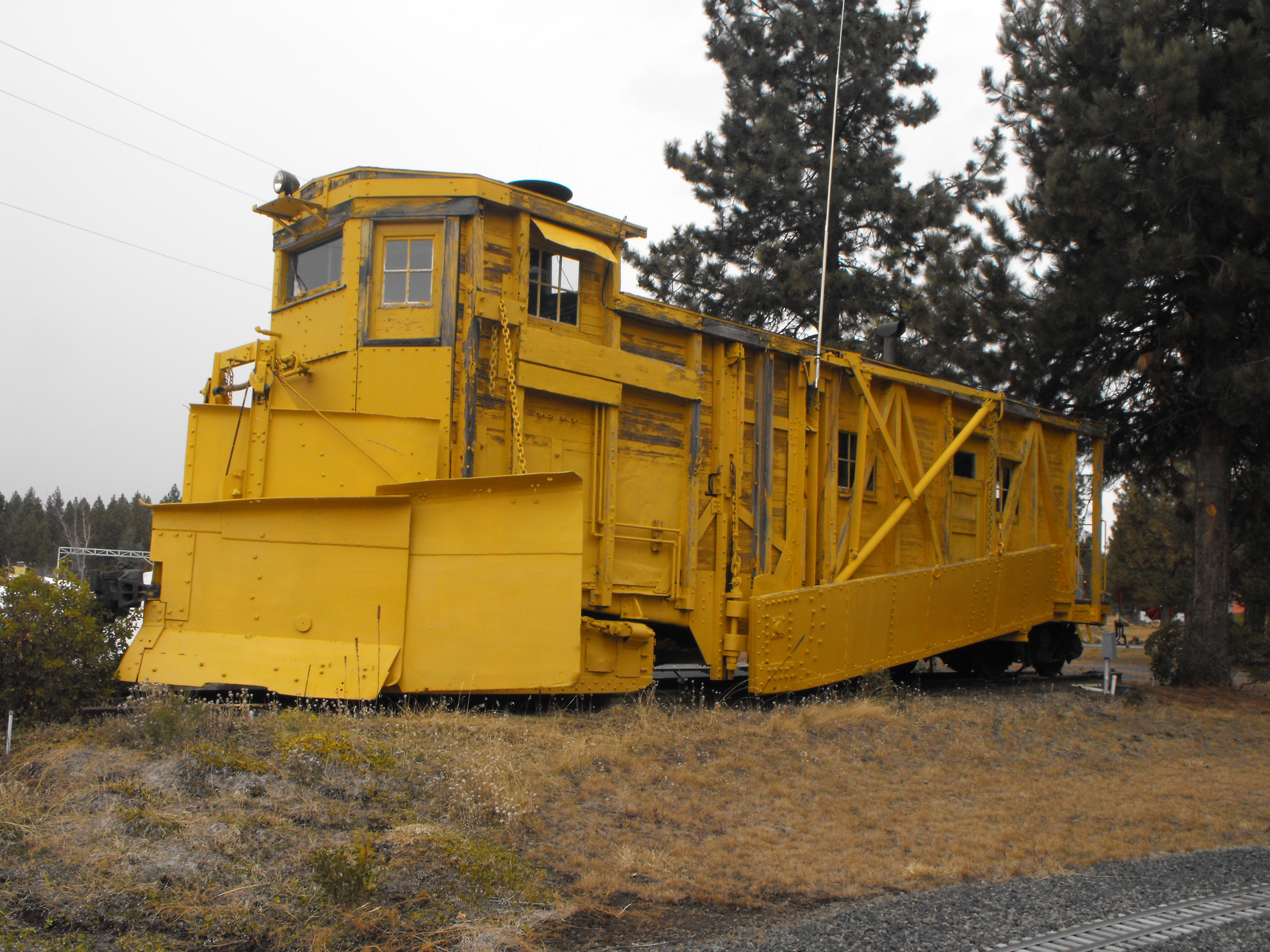
Weyerhaeuser Snow Dozier WX 031

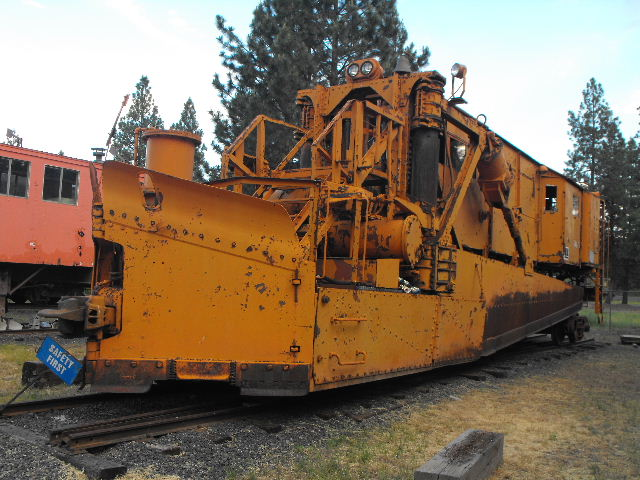
Antique Southern Pacific SP MW4047 Jordan Spreader

== Train meets ==
=== Triennial events ===
In the year 2000, Train Mountain began the tradition of holding Triennials, which have been held every three years thereafter. The sole exception was 2021, which was postponed to 2022 because of the COVID-19 pandemic.

The high point of the Triennial is the Big Toot in which all trains assemble on the last Saturday and blow their whistles for one minute. Participants from Australia, Switzerland, Canada, Germany, UK, and the US have attended.

A specific entrance donation is requested from visitors only during the Triennial event week.

During the summer of 2012, the 25th anniversary of the founding of Train Mountain was celebrated. The celebration featured an international miniature train meet entitled the "2012 Triennial".

The 2018 Triennial attracted trains that totaled more than 10,000 feet (3,000 m) in length.

The 2022 Triennial had approximately 888 participants, a drop of about 20% from 2018, but more trains than in 2018.

The Triennial for 2025 was scheduled for 16 days from June 14 through June 29, with the main operating meet days being the period of 9 days from June 21 through June 29.

=== Other events ===
Other train meets for members and those who own, operate, or have an interest in 7 1/2 in (190.5 mm) gauge railroading are held seven times a year.

These events attract participants from all over the US and Canada. They are popular with live steam enthusiasts due to the uniqueness of the layout, and the ability to operate heavy steam powered locomotives that may not be allowed at other railroads.

== Visitors ==
Train Mountain is a club and museum, not an amusement park, so it does not offer "rides". Volunteer members do, however, offer "tours", which are train rides that can vary from 30 minutes up to 8 hours (480 minutes) in length. On longer tours, the group will still not see all of the Train Mountain track.

The club often provides 30-minute tours on a regular schedule weekdays from 10 AM to 3 PM (10:00 to 15:00 local time) during the summer (the gate opens at 9 AM (09:00)) and 11 AM to 2 PM (11:00 to 14:00) during the off season.

More extensive tours can be scheduled either with a train operator directly or with the Train Mountain Office.

Tours can be offered on Train Mountain-owned or member-owned equipment. A guide to walking among the historic full-sized museum equipment is available on request. No admission is charged, but donations are accepted to enable maintenance and expansion.

== Klamath & Western Railroad ==
Free public train rides are available at Klamath & Western Railroad (K&WRR) on Saturdays from Memorial Day to Labor Day. The K&WRR is a 501(c)3 non-profit public benefit corporation, which is located directly east and adjacent to Train Mountain on South Chiloquin Road. The train ride uses approximately 1.6 miles (2.6 km) of track, and takes about 15 to 20 minutes.

Klamath & Western Railroad existed prior to the founding of Train Mountain under the name of "Over The Hill Live Steamers" which was a result of being referred to as being over the hill from the Medford Live Steamers (Southern Oregon Live Steamers),) since to get there one had to traverse the Oregon Cascade Mountain Range.

Klamath & Western Railroad has several antique railroad items on display, including the antique Train Order Semaphore Signal, originally used at the Southern Pacific Station in Junction City, Oregon.

Klamath & Western RR
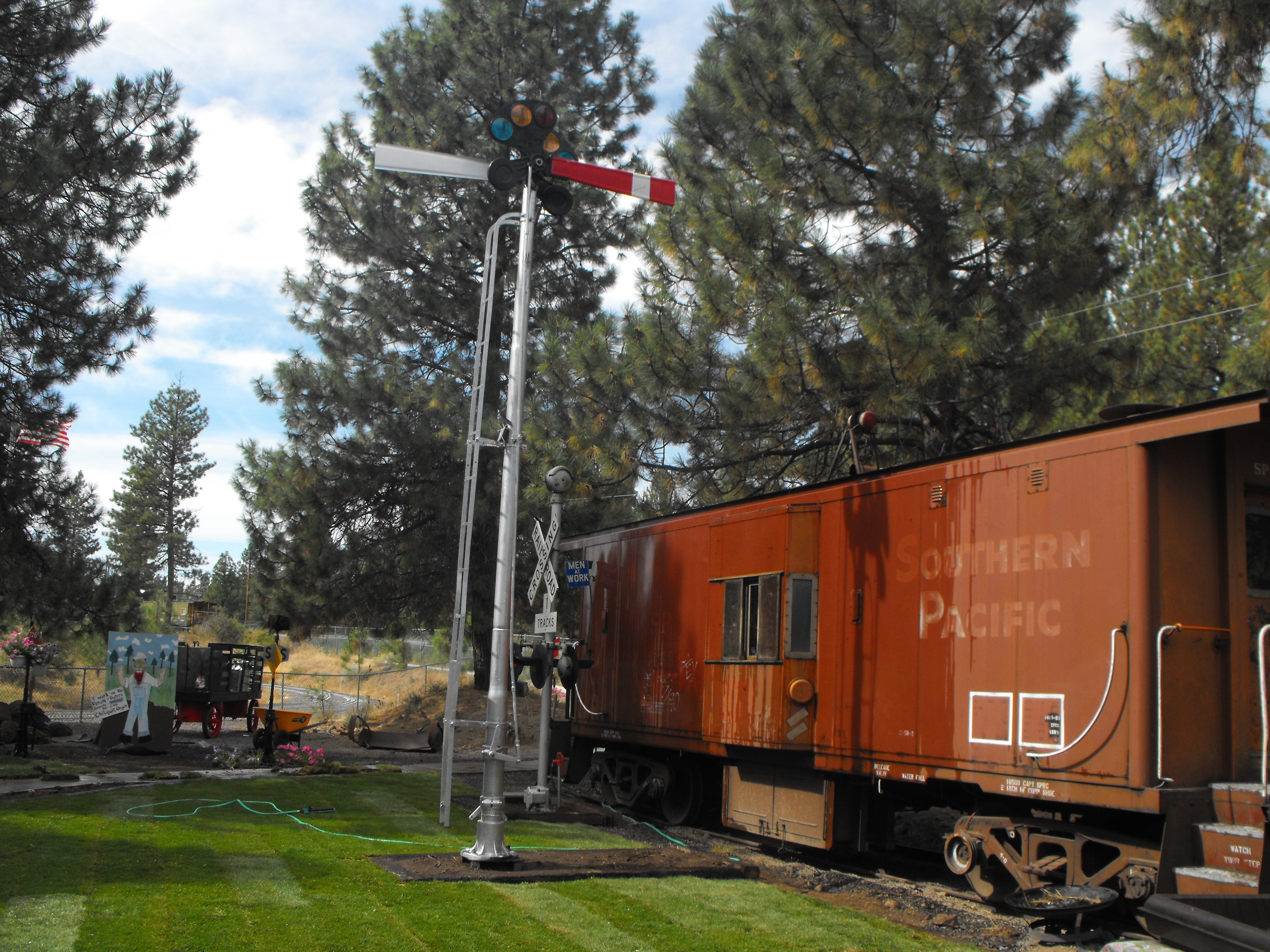
Train Order Semaphore

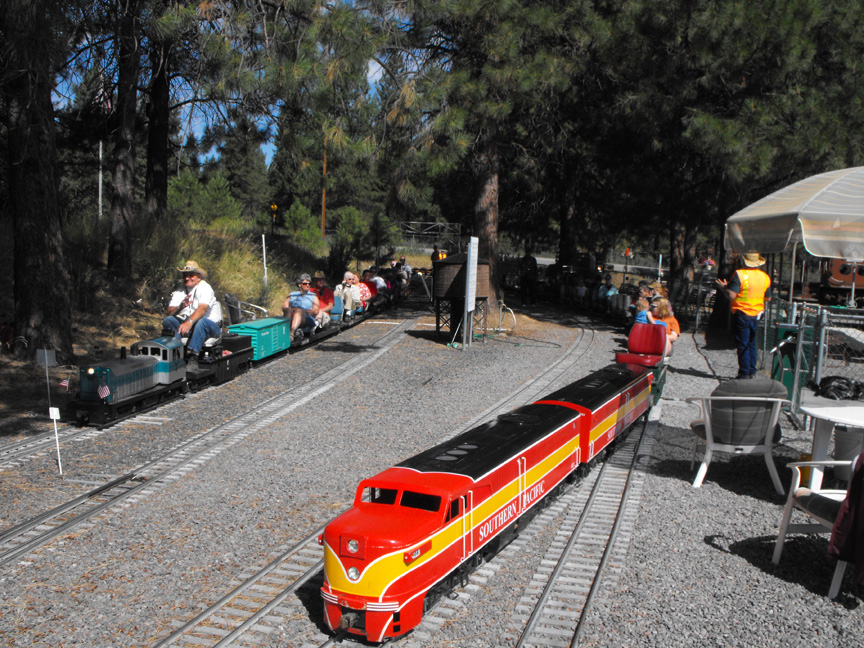
Public Train Rides

== Technology ==
Train Mountain features a Central Train Control or centralized traffic control ("CTC"), a computer controlled switching and signal system. The status of this system can be viewed online at the Friends of Train Mountain website.
