= Shady Cove, Oregon =

City in the United States

- City
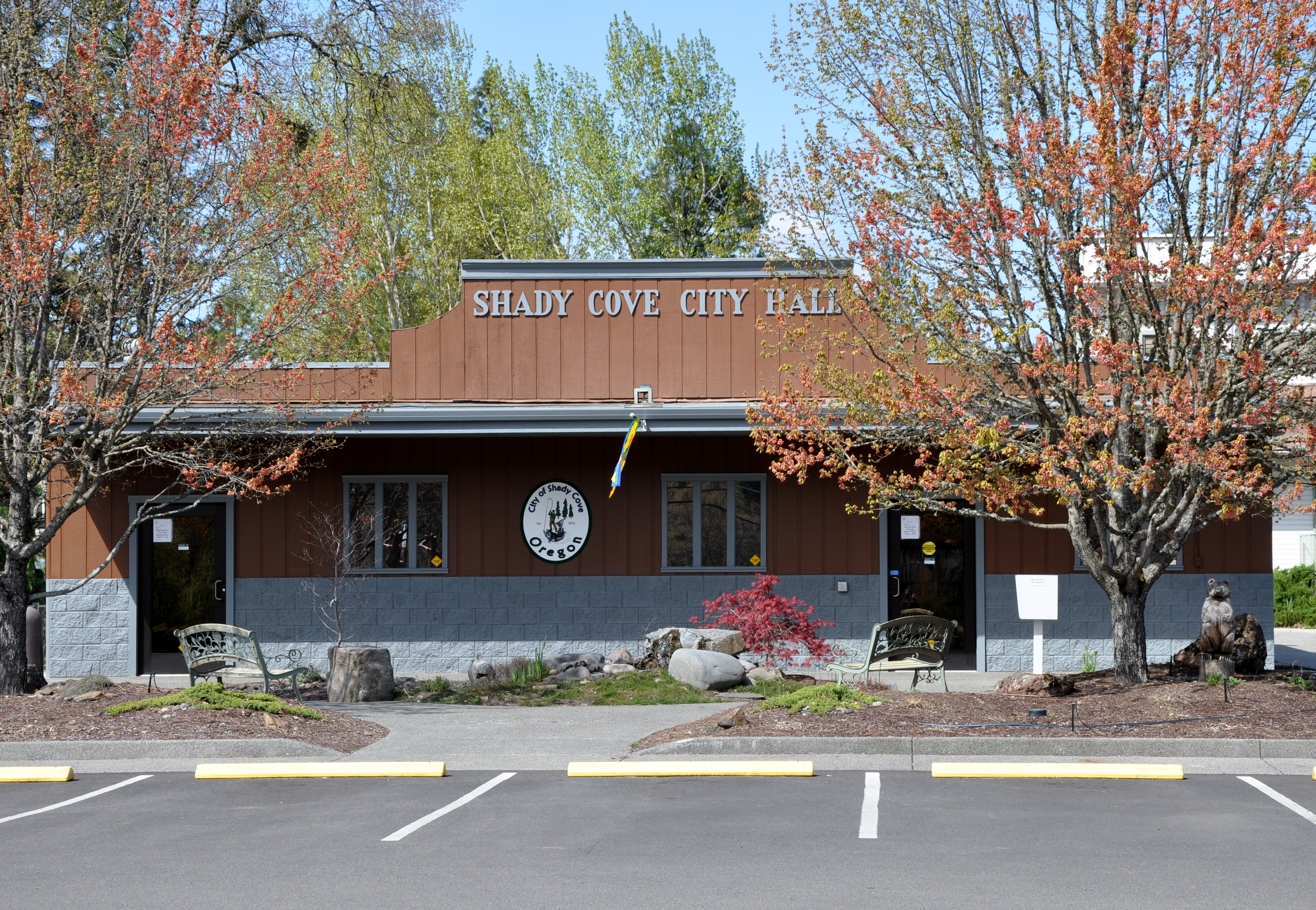
- Shady Cove City Hall
- Nickname: The Jewel of the Upper Rogue
- Motto: "And a River Runs Through It!"
- Location in Oregon
- Coordinates: 42°37′26″N 122°48′58″W
- Country: United States
- State: Oregon
- County: Jackson
- Incorporated: 1972

Government
  - Mayor: 2020-Present Shari Tarvin

Area
  - Total: 2.05 sq mi (5.30 km^{2})
  - Land: 1.95 sq mi (5.04 km^{2})
  - Water: 0.10 sq mi (0.26 km^{2})
- Elevation: 1,378 ft (420 m)

Population (2020)
  - Total: 3,081
  - Density: 1,583.2/sq mi (611.26/km^{2})
- Time zone: UTC-8 (Pacific)
  - Summer (DST): UTC-7 (Pacific)
- ZIP code: 97539
- Area code: 541
- FIPS code: 41-66550
- GNIS feature ID: 2411872
- Website: www.shadycove.org

Shady Cove is a city in Jackson County, Oregon, United States. As of the 2020 census, Shady Cove had a population of 3,081.

== History ==
The city of Shady Cove was incorporated in 1973. Before that, the nearby towns of Trail to the north and Eagle Point to the south were the historic population centers. Etna, the town's precursor, lay between.

Settlers started moving into the area, spreading out from Trail, in the 1870s. In 1882, the post stopped in Etna for the first time, though the Postal Service did not establish an office in a place called Shady Cove until September 12, 1939, a Mrs. Lillian Hukill as postmistress. The city's name has no clear origin. It is possible that a man named Barnes established a town site he called "The Cove". However, according to Barbara Hegne, a local historian, the name for Shady Cove came from a speculative operation by some Medford businessmen. They bought some land for summer homes on the east side of the river and called their business the "Shady Cove Country Club".

The first bridge over the Rogue River in Shady Cove was built in 1921 and washed away by the Christmas flood of 1964. The already above-average rainfall for the year was followed by a historic warm-temperature storm, called a Pineapple Express. According to a local resident, the bridge was knocked out by a log jam started when an old growth Douglas fir was trapped by rising waters against the steel of the bridge. The structure held for roughly seven hours as logs piled up behind it until nine in the evening on December 23, when the bridge washed away. The Dodge and Touvelle bridges further downstream were both damaged, and there was no easy way to get into the town until the placement of a temporary Bailey bridge three months later. Initially, the Shady Cove School functioned as a refuge and a food distribution point. The flood control dam at Lost Creek Lake was installed in 1977 to mitigate future catastrophic flooding.

== Geography ==
Shady Cove is in northern Jackson County, on both sides of the Rogue River. Oregon Route 62 is the main road through the community, leading north 2 miles (3 km) to Trail and south 21 miles (34 km) to Medford, the Jackson county seat. The west boundary of Crater Lake National Park is 43 miles (69 km) to the northeast via Route 62.

According to the United States Census Bureau, Shady Cove has a total area of 2.01 square miles (5.21 km^{2}), of which 1.91 square miles (4.95 km^{2}) is land and 0.10 square miles (0.26 km^{2}) is water.

== Economy ==
Early in the town's history, the lumber trade drove the economy. However, Wilson's Lumber Mill was destroyed in the 1964 flood, and was not rebuilt. By the 1980s, the lumber trade left the town. Tourism replaced timber, and now the major industry of the town is in the service sector focused on the presence of the Rogue River. Tourist opportunities include rafting and year-round fishing.

== Demographics ==
Historical population
Census	Pop.	Note	%±
1980	1,097		—
1990	1,351		23.2%
2000	2,307		70.8%
2010	2,904		25.9%
2020	3,081		6.1%
U.S. Decennial Census

=== 2020 census ===
As of the 2020 census, Shady Cove had a population of 3,081. The median age was 55.6 years. 16.2% of residents were under the age of 18 and 31.8% of residents were 65 years of age or older. For every 100 females there were 94.9 males, and for every 100 females age 18 and over there were 93.5 males age 18 and over.

0% of residents lived in urban areas, while 100.0% lived in rural areas.

There were 1,381 households in Shady Cove, of which 20.0% had children under the age of 18 living in them. Of all households, 46.6% were married-couple households, 19.6% were households with a male householder and no spouse or partner present, and 26.1% were households with a female householder and no spouse or partner present. About 29.9% of all households were made up of individuals and 17.1% had someone living alone who was 65 years of age or older.

There were 1,506 housing units, of which 8.3% were vacant. Among occupied housing units, 74.7% were owner-occupied and 25.3% were renter-occupied. The homeowner vacancy rate was 2.3% and the rental vacancy rate was 3.3%.

Racial composition as of the 2020 census
Race	Number	Percent
White	2,752	89.3%
Black or African American	8	0.3%
American Indian and Alaska Native	27	0.9%
Asian	23	0.7%
Native Hawaiian and Other Pacific Islander	4	0.1%
Some other race	76	2.5%
Two or more races	191	6.2%
Hispanic or Latino (of any race)	173	5.6%

=== 2010 census ===
As of the census of 2010, there were 2,904 people, 1,291 households, and 819 families residing in the city. The population density was 1,520.4 inhabitants per square mile (587.0/km^{2}). There were 1,459 housing units at an average density of 763.9 units per square mile (294.9 units/km^{2}). The racial makeup of the city was 95.5% White, 0.3% African American, 0.7% Native American, 0.3% Asian, 0.6% from other races, and 2.7% from two or more races. Hispanic or Latino of any race were 4.7% of the population.

There were 1,291 households, of which 19.6% had children under the age of 18 living with them, 51.6% were married couples living together, 7.0% had a female householder with no husband present, 4.8% had a male householder with no wife present, and 36.6% were non-families. 28.8% of all households were made up of individuals, and 15% had someone living alone who was 65 years of age or older. The average household size was 2.25 and the average family size was 2.69.

The median age in the city was 51.8 years. 16.9% of residents were under the age of 18; 6.2% were between the ages of 18 and 24; 17.2% were from 25 to 44; 33.1% were from 45 to 64; and 26.7% were 65 years of age or older. The gender makeup of the city was 49.6% male and 50.4% female.

=== 2000 census ===
As of the census of 2020, there were 3,080 people, 989 households, and 689 families residing in the city. The population density was 1,153.4 inhabitants per square mile (445.3/km^{2}). There were 1,107 housing units at an average density of 553.5 units per square mile (213.7 units/km^{2}). The racial makeup of the city was 95.23% White, 0.30% African American, 2.25% Native American, 0.39% Asian, 0.30% from other races, and 1.52% from two or more races. Hispanic or Latino of any race were 2.90% of the population.

There were 993 households, out of which 24.3% had children under the age of 18 living with them, 56.4% were married couples living together, 8.3% had a female householder with no husband present, and 30.3% were non-families. 23.5% of all households were made up of individuals, and 12.5% had someone living alone who was 65 years of age or older. The average household size was 2.33 and the average family size was 2.73.

In the city, the population was 21.6% under the age of 18, 6.0% from 18 to 24, 22.3% from 25 to 44, 27.8% from 45 to 64, and 22.3% who were 65 years of age or older. The median age was 45 years. For every 100 females, there were 97.7 males. For every 100 females age 18 and over, there were 99.0 males.

The median income for a household in the city was $33,429, and the median income for a family was $38,819. Males had a median income of $31,250 versus $23,533 for females. The per capita income for the city was $17,564. About 6.4% of families and 10.2% of the population were below the poverty line, including 12.2% of those under age 18 and 8.2% of those age 65 or over.

== Services ==
The city of Shady Cove is governed by a mayor and a four-member council. The city employs a floodplain manager, in keeping with a 2007 FEMA decision.

The town is home to Jackson County Fire District number 4, staffed by three captains, four fire fighters, and approximately twelve volunteers. The fire department is equipped to provide "emergency fire and medical response, and swift water and high angle rescue services to the Shady Cove and Upper Rogue area." The department was established in 1956 and is tasked with 34 square miles of Jackson County, Oregon. The district responds to around 1,000 incidents a year. Greg Winfrey is the fire chief in the district as of February 2018.

The town's library has regular hours and community programming. However, the hours are not commensurate with full business days, as the branch is open three days a week for a total of 18 hours every week. After the April 2007 termination of a federal program for counties reliant on a declining lumber industry and the defeat of a May 2007 property tax levy that would have closed much of the deficit, the libraries were privatized by LSSI, a for-profit company headquartered in Maryland.

The city has a community center that offers a food pantry, a thrift store, youth activities and a lunch program on Wednesdays. The community center is staffed by volunteers.

There are two parks within city limits. One, Aunt Caroline's Park, is run by the city, and is named for Caroline Drexler, a pioneer woman of Etna. The other, Upper Rogue Regional Park, is run by the county, and has a parking fee for use of the boat ramp, day use area, and playground. The county also runs the Riverhouse, a popular wedding and event venue that can be rented all year. Both parks have toilets and parking areas.

Shady Cove is part of Jackson County school district number 9, which includes Eagle Point, White City, and the surrounding areas. The school in town is the Shady Cove School, and serves grades K-8. In 2012, the school was within the top 5% of Oregon schools that receive title 1 funds.
