= Ka'ila Farrell-Smith =

Native American visual artist, environmental activist, and writer

- Born: 1982 (age 43–44); Springfield, Oregon
- Citizenship: Native American Modoc/Klamath Tribe
- Education: BFA from Pacific Northwest College of Art | MFA from Portland State University
- Title: Ka'ila Farrell-Smith

Ka'ila Farrell-Smith (born 1982) is a Native American Modoc/Klamath visual artist, environmental activist, and writer.

== Biography ==
Ka'ila Farrell-Smith was born in 1982 and raised in Springfield, Oregon. She is a member of the Klamath Modoc tribe, a federally recognized tribe from Southern Oregon in the Klamath Basin. Farrell-Smith is based in Modoc Point, Oregon.

== Education ==
Ka'ila Farrell-Smith received her Bachelor of Fine Arts (BFA) in painting from the Pacific Northwest College of Art (PNCA) in Portland, Oregon. She then received her (MFA) Master of Fine Arts in Contemporary Art Practice (StudioMFA) from Portland State University (PSU).

== Artworks ==
Farrell-Smith is a contemporary multimedia artist, who works in a mixture of illustration, painting, screen printing, stenciling, among other media. Smith uses childlike playfulness in her art as a tool to explore and experiment with self-made pigments to create an aesthetic that takes the space of abstract Indigenous formalism. Her art explores American Indigenous peoples' trials and tribulations rooted in the past and its effects on the present. She uses her art and publications to advocate for American indigenous peoples' rights.

=== Ghosts in the Machine: 019 ===
019 is from the August 2023 series titled "Ghosts in the Machine". This series consists of twenty-seven paintings for the "Land Back" series. These paintings are made using Northern Paiute lithium topsoil, acrylics, aerosols, and graphite. The pieces in this series range in size, 019 is 48 x 30 inches on stretched canvas. The purpose of this exhibition was to confront the use of indigenous sacred land resources for the use of Western technologies.

=== Raindance: 19/40 ===
"Raindance" 19/40 is from the 2022 series titled “Rain Dance”. It comes from another series of prints for the Russo Lee Gallery in Portland, Oregon. These were made with monotype, screenprint, and spray paint on hand-dyed Arnhem 1618; 20 x 15 inches unframed. This series was created in collaboration with Matrix Press at the University of Montana. These works depict a black silhouetted figure with their arms reaching to the sky. Behind and around this figure are red and black markings. Additionally, we see marks made using stencils to create a form using negative space.

=== After Boarding School: In Mourning ===
"After Boarding School: In Mourning" was created in 2011. It's made from oil on canvas and measures 36 x 24 inches. Since 2012 its been in the permanent collection at the Portland Art Museum in Portland, Oregon. Farrell-Smith used a photo by Edward Curtis titled "Mosa-Mohave" 1903 as inspiration for her painting. Curtis was a Native American Portraitist from 1900 to 1930's. This painting is also inspired by Farrell-Smith's father's experience in boarding school as a child. Similar to Curtis, The painting is also a portrait of a young indigenous girl, but her hair has been cut above the shoulders. Her gaze goes past the viewer and she seems to have a somber expression. This piece represents one of the children who were lucky enough to survive the Native American boarding school experience.

== Select exhibitions ==
=== Solo exhibitions ===
- Ka'ila Farrell-Smith: Ghosts in the Machine, Russo Lee Gallery, Portland, Oregon, USA, 2023
- Ka'ila Farrell-Smith, Linda Hodges Gallery, Seattle, Washington, USA, 2017

=== Group exhibitions ===
==== 2023 ====
- Many Wests: Artists Shape an American Idea, Smithsonian American Art Museum, Washington D.C., District Of Columbia, USA
- When Nur Speak, Shasta County Arts Council, Redding, California, USA
- Inherent Memory, Museum of Contemporary Native Arts, Santa Fe, Santa Fe, New Mexico, USA

==== 2021 ====
- Mesh, Portland Art Museum, Oregon, Portland, Oregon, USA

==== 2020 ====
- Eartha, Adams and Ollman, Portland, Oregon, USA

== Collections ==
Farrell-Smith's work, Off the Ground. Land Back Series (2019-2021). Wild harvested pigments from Klamath land, land back stencils, aerosols, acrylic paint, oil bars and graphite on birch wood panel. 60" x 48," (2021) is held in the permanent collection of the Portland Art Museum. Her work, Vision Quest Glyphology. Oil painting, 2013. 72” x 48,” is in the collection of the Kamiak Elementary School, Pullman, Washington. Her painting Enrollment is in the permanent collection of the Jordan Schnitzer Museum of Art. Eugene, Oregon. Farrell-Smith's work, G' EE' LA (2018) is in the collection of the National Gallery of Art, Washington DC. Her work, After Boarding School: In Mourning is in the permanent collection of the Portland Art Museum, purchased with funds from the Native American Art Council.

== Honors and awards ==
- Hallie Ford Fellowship. Ford Family Foundation, Oregon, 2021
- Fields Artist Fellowship. Oregon Humanities and Oregon Community Foundation, Oregon, 2020
- Fields Artist Fellowship. Oregon Humanities and Oregon Community Foundation, Oregon, 2019

== Publications ==
- Decolonial Arts Praxis: Transnational Pedagogies and Activism. Edited by Injeong Yoon-Ramirez, Alejandra I. Ramírez. Chapter 3, “Ghosts Rider: Performing Fugitive Indigeneity" by Ka’ila Farrell-Smith. Routledge Research in Decolonizing Education, Taylor and Francis Group, CRC Press.
- The Land Carries our Ancestors. Exhibition Book. Curated and edited by Jaune Quick-to-See Smith, written contributions by Joy Harjo, heather ahtone, Shana Bushyhead Condill. National Gallery of Art, Washington in association with Princeton University Press, Princeton and Oxford, 2023.

=== 2022 ===
- Archaeologies of Indigenous Presence. Edited by Tsim D. Schneider and Lee M. Panich. University Press of Florida, 2/15/2022. Cover Art "Alien Invasion: 1492,"Crow's Shadow five color lithograph with collaborating Master printer Judith Baumann, 30" x 22.5," 2018
