= OR4 =

OR4 or OR-4 may refer to:

- Other ranks (UK)
- Oregon's 4th congressional district
- Oregon Route 4, part of U.S. Route 97 in Oregon
