= Klamath Agency, Oregon =

Unincorporated community in the state of Oregon, United States

- Unincorporated community
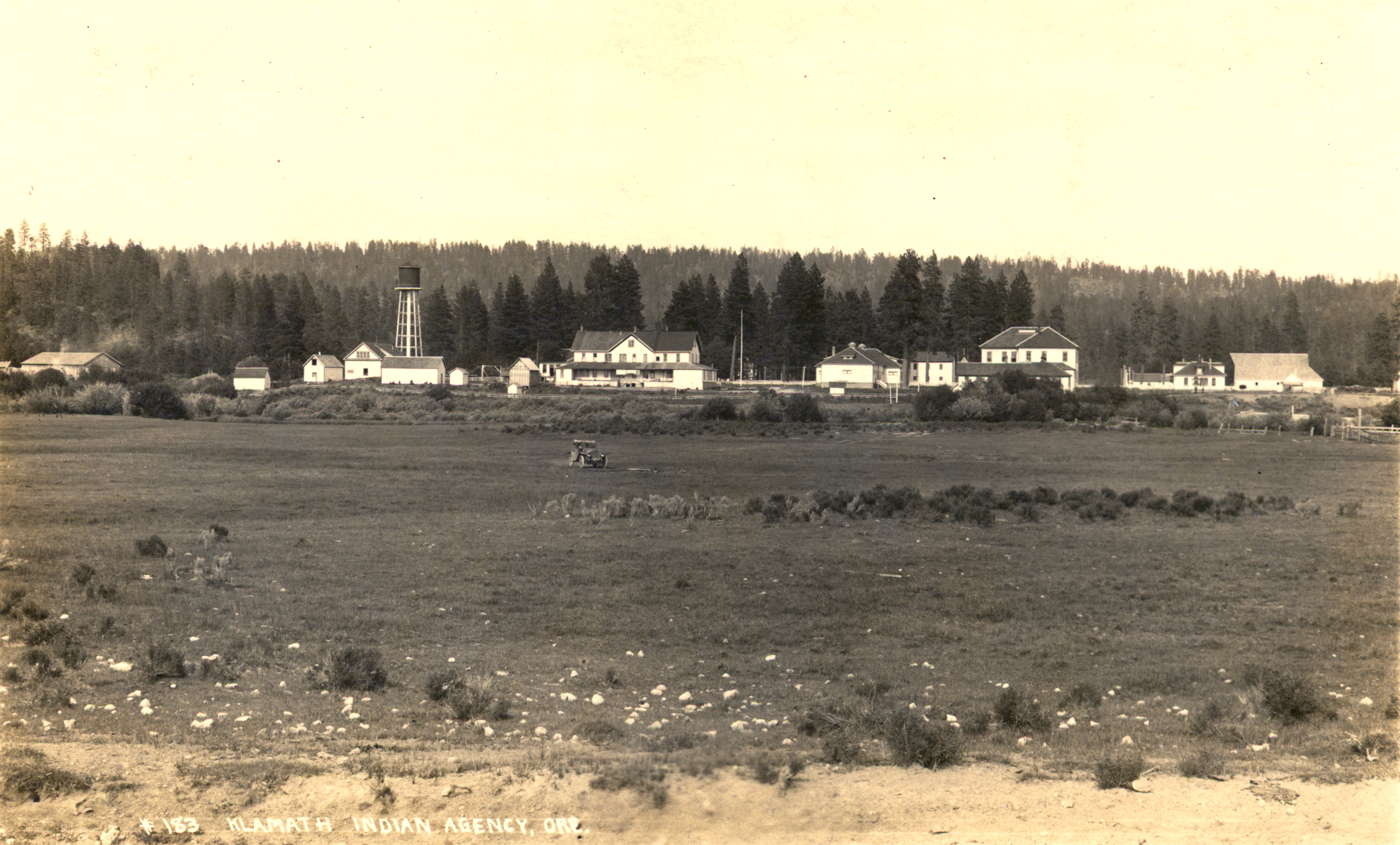
- Klamath Indian Agency in 1915

- Location within Oregon and the United States Klamath Agency (the United States)
- Coordinates: 42°37′05″N 121°56′02″W
- Country: United States
- State: Oregon
- County: Klamath
- Elevation: 4,180 ft (1,270 m)
- Time zone: UTC-8 (Pacific (PST))
  - Summer (DST): UTC-7 (PDT)
- GNIS feature ID: 1144657

Klamath Agency is an unincorporated community in Klamath County, Oregon, United States. The community is located on Oregon Route 62, adjacent to the confluence of Agency Creek and Crooked Creek. The Klamath Agency is now home to the Sage Community Charter School.

== History ==
Klamath Agency was an Indian agency for the Klamath Indian Reservation established May 12, 1866, on the shore of Agency Lake. The current location of the former agency is 3 miles (5 km) north of that site. The Klamath Reservation was terminated in 1961, but the community at Klamath Agency still exists. The Klamath Agency post office was established in 1878 and operated until 1965, when the mail was instead routed to Chiloquin.

In 1870, there was a sawmill at the agency; it burned down in 1911. In the 1890s, Klamath Agency was the site of two Indian boarding schools—one for boys and one for girls.

In 1945, Ray Enouf Field was dedicated at the agency. The airfield was named in honor of the only Klamath Indian to die in World War II. Raymond L. Enouf was a Marine private first class, who was killed while acting as a medic on the front lines during the Battle of Iwo Jima.

== See also ==
- Klamath Tribes
- Indian termination policy
