= Oregon Route 62 =

State highway in southern Oregon, US

Oregon Route 62
- Crater Lake Highway
- Route 62; mainline in red, business route in blue

Route information
- Maintained by ODOT
- Length: 83.52 mi (134.41 km)
- Existed: 1932–present

Major junctions
- West end: OR 99 in Medford
- OR 238 in Medford; I-5 in Medford; OR 140 in White City; OR 234 near Eagle Point; OR 227 in Trail; OR 230 near Union Creek; OR 422 in Klamath Agency
- East end: US 97 at the Kla-Mo-Ya Casino

Location
- Country: United States
- State: Oregon

Highway system
- Oregon Highways; Interstate; US; State; Named; Scenic
| ← OR 58 | → OR 66 |

Oregon Route 62 is an Oregon state highway that runs between the city of Medford, and U.S. Route 97 between Chiloquin and Klamath Falls. The highway approaches Crater Lake National Park from the south, and is known as the Crater Lake Highway. While the highway is signed east-to-west, it is in reality shaped somewhat like a horseshoe; heading north-northeast from Medford, turning east as it approaches the park, and then turning south-southeast as it approaches Klamath Falls. Oregon Route 140 intersects with OR 62 in White City and Oregon Route 66 (which runs directly between Ashland and Klamath Falls). These are more direct routes between Medford and Klamath Falls. Route 62 comprises a portion of the Volcanic Legacy Scenic Byway.

== Route description ==
Oregon Route 62 begins (at its "western" terminus) at an intersection with Oregon Route 99 and Oregon Route 238 just north of downtown Medford. The highway heads north, crosses and intersects with Interstate 5, and continues north as an expressway. About 6 miles (10 km) north of Medford, the highway passes through White City, where it intersects with OR 140. It then heads into the Cascade foothills, intersecting with Oregon Routes 234 and 227. As it approaches the park, the highway starts heading in a more easterly direction. Just short of the park, in the community of Union Creek, the highway intersects with Oregon Route 230, which provides a north–south bypass of Crater Lake.

After the intersection with OR 230, the highway turns east. Eight miles east of Union Creek, the highway enters Crater Lake National Park, and runs through the park for 18 miles (29 km). OR 62 does not get close to the lake itself; an access road midway through the park provides a route to the rim of the lake. After the access road, the highway turns south.

West of the city of Chiloquin, the highway intersects Oregon Route 422, which provides access to Chiloquin (and US 97 northbound), and the Modoc Point Highway, which provides access to Agency Lake. South of Chiloquin, Oregon Route 62 ends at an intersection with U.S. Route 97. U.S. 97 continues south to Klamath Falls.

Oregon Route 62 is 83 miles (134 km) in length.

== History ==
A section of Route 62 between Medford and White City was moved to a new, four-lane freeway in May 2019. The 4.5-mile (7.2 km) Rogue Valley Expressway cost $120 million and began construction in May 2016. A future expansion would connect it with Interstate 5 and Eagle Point.

== Major intersections ==
Note: mileposts do not reflect actual mileage due to realignments.

| County | Location | mi | km | Destinations | Notes |
|---|---|---|---|---|---|
| Jackson | Medford | 0.05 | 0.080 | OR 99 / OR 238 west – Central Point, Medford City Center, Jacksonville | |
| Jackson | Medford | 0.47 | 0.76 | I-5 – Grants Pass, Ashland | I-5 exit 30; Interchange |
| Jackson | Medford | 0.57 | 0.92 | Biddle Road – Medford Airport | Interchange |
| Jackson | | 6.03 | 9.70 | OR 140 – Lake of the Woods, Klamath Falls | |
| Jackson | | 13.63 | 21.94 | OR 234 – Gold Hill, Grants Pass | |
| Jackson | Trail | 22.42 | 36.08 | Tiller, Canyonville (OR 227) | |
| Jackson | | 57.31 | 92.23 | OR 230 east – Diamond Lake, Bend | |
| Klamath | | 73.16 | 117.74 | Crater Lake | |
| Klamath | Fort Klamath | 90.07 | 144.95 | Rocky Point, Lake of the Woods | Former Klamath Lake Highway |
| Klamath | Fort Klamath Junction | 91.33 | 146.98 | Sun Mountain Road – Kimball Park | Former Sun Mountain Highway |
| Klamath | | 97.32 | 156.62 | Modoc Point Road | Former Modoc Point Highway |
| Klamath | | 98.55 | 158.60 | To US 97 north (OR 422) – Chiloquin, Bend, Agency Lake | |
| Klamath | | 102.47 | 164.91 | South Chiloquin Road | Former Chiloquin Highway |
| Klamath | Lobert Junction | 103.95 | 167.29 | US 97 – Chemult, Bend, Modoc Point, Klamath Falls | |
1.000 mi = 1.609 km; 1.000 km = 0.621 mi
