= Oregon Route 370 =

East-west state highway in Oregon, US

Oregon Route 370
- Route 370 highlighted in red

Route information
- Maintained by ODOT
- Length: 17.87 mi (28.76 km)
- Existed: 2002–present

Major junctions
- West end: US 97 near Redmond
- East end: OR 126 in Prineville

Location
- Country: United States
- State: Oregon
- Counties: Crook, Deschutes

Highway system
- Oregon Highways; Interstate; US; State; Named; Scenic
← OR 361	→ OR 380

Oregon Route 370 (OR 370) is an Oregon state highway running from US 97 near Redmond to OR 126 in Prineville. OR 370 is known as the O'Neil Highway No. 370 (see Oregon highways and routes). It is 17.87 miles (28.76 km) long and runs east–west.

OR 370 was established in 2002 as part of Oregon's project to assign route numbers to highways that previously were not assigned, and, as of July 2021, was unsigned.

== Route description ==
OR 370 begins at an intersection with US 97 approximately 2 miles (3.2 km) north of Redmond and heads east through O'Neil to Prineville, where it ends at an intersection with OR 126.

== History ==
OR 370 was assigned to the O'Neil Highway in 2002.

== Major intersections ==
County	Location	mi	km	Destinations	Notes
Deschutes		0.00	0.00	US 97 – Redmond, Bend, Terrebonne, Madras	
Crook	Prineville	17.87	28.76	OR 126 – Prineville, Redmond	
1.000 mi = 1.609 km; 1.000 km = 0.621 mi
