= Chiloquin, Oregon =

- City
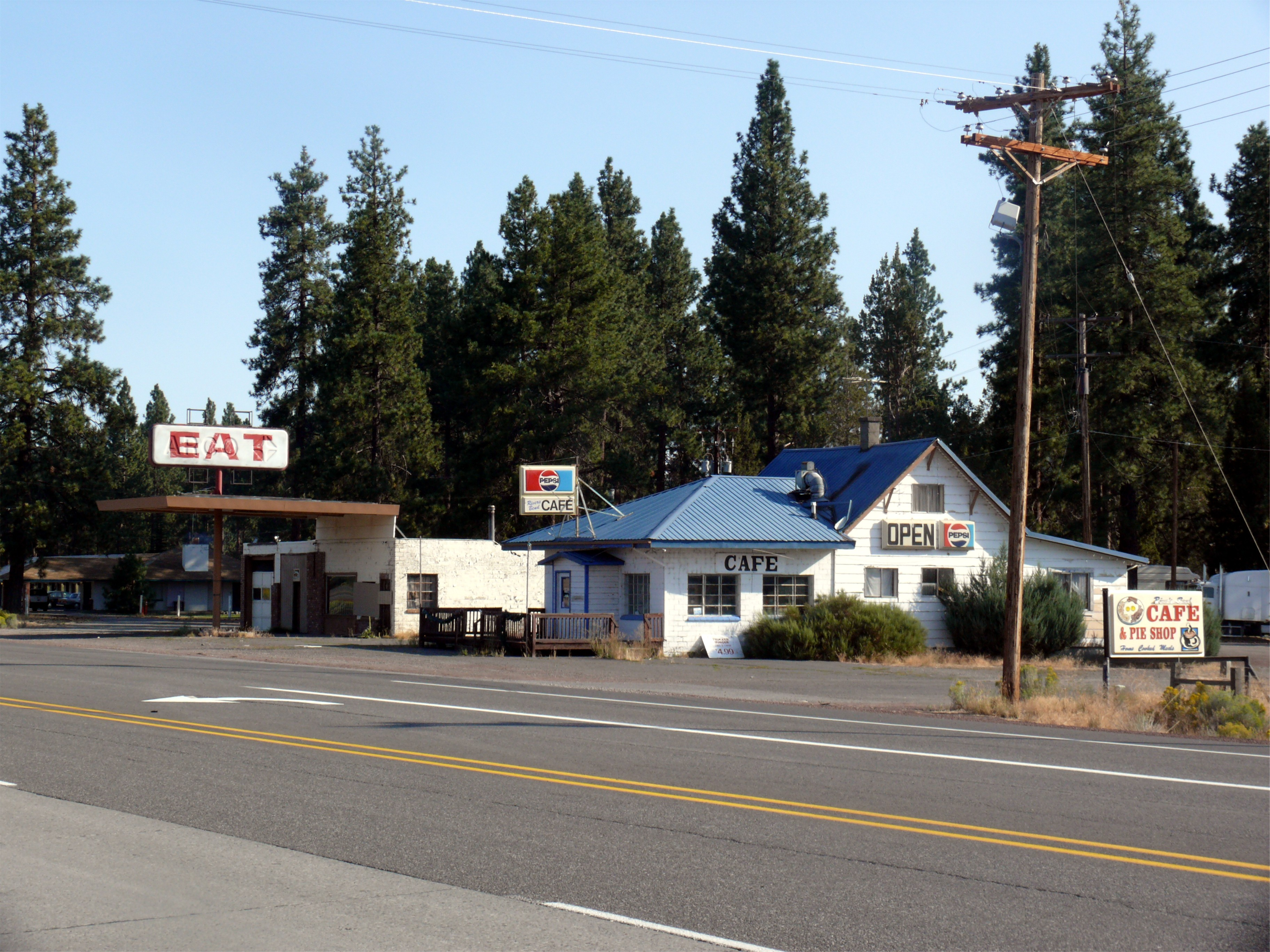
- Williamson River

- Flag

- Location in Oregon
- Coordinates: 42°34′39″N 121°52′24″W
- Country: United States
- State: Oregon
- County: Klamath
- Incorporated: 1926

Area
  - Total: 0.82 sq mi (2.12 km^{2})
  - Land: 0.82 sq mi (2.12 km^{2})
  - Water: 0 sq mi (0.00 km^{2})
- Elevation: 4,187 ft (1,276 m)

Population (2020)
  - Total: 767
  - Density: 938.3/sq mi (362.27/km^{2})
- Time zone: UTC-8 (Pacific)
  - Summer (DST): UTC-7 (Pacific)
- ZIP codes: 97604, 97624
- Area code: 541
- FIPS code: 41-13050
- GNIS feature ID: 2409451
- Website: www.cityofchiloquin.org

Chiloquin (/ˈtʃɪləkwɪn/ CHIL-ə-kwin) (Klamath: mbosaksawaas, "flint place") is a city in Klamath County, Oregon, United States. Chiloquin was the pioneer version of a Klamath family name Chaloquin, which was the name of a Klamath chief who was alive at the time of the treaty of 1864. Southern Pacific records also show that a woman named Bessie Chiloquin deeded a right-of-way through the area to the railroad on February 14, 1914. As of the 2020 census, Chiloquin had a population of 767.

== Geography ==
Chiloquin is at an elevation of 4,180 feet (1,270 m) in Klamath County. The city is slightly east of U.S. Route 97 and slightly north of its intersection with Oregon Route 62. A short east–west highway, Oregon Route 422, links Route 97 at Chiloquin to Route 62 slightly south of Klamath Agency. By highway, Chiloquin is about 26 miles (42 km) north of Klamath Falls and 253 miles (407 km) south of Portland.

The Williamson River flows north–south through Chiloquin, where it receives the Sprague River from the east. The city is near the Winema National Forest, which approaches it from the east and west. Agency Lake is nearby, west of the city and slightly west of Route 62. According to the United States Census Bureau, the city has a total area of 0.82 square miles (2.12 km^{2}), all of it land.

== Climate ==
This region experiences warm (but not hot) and dry summers, with no average monthly temperatures above 71.6 °F. According to the Köppen Climate Classification system, Chiloquin has a warm-summer Mediterranean climate, abbreviated "Csb" on climate maps. In the spring and summer, this area experiences extremely large swarms of the "Klamath Midge", Chironomus an insect family of nonbiting midges, in the fly Order Diptera. They do not present a health risk but due to their numbers - with swarms of thousands - they can clog car radiators, obscure windshields, and foul electric bug zappers to the point of shorting out. No major efforts to control their numbers have been made in Oregon, according to Oregon Encyclopedia. Klamath midge (oregonencyclopedia.org)

Climate data for Chiloquin 12 NW, Oregon, 1991–2020 normals, 1980–2020 extremes: 4180ft (1274m)
Month	Jan	Feb	Mar	Apr	May	Jun	Jul	Aug	Sep	Oct	Nov	Dec	Year
Record high °F (°C)	62 (17)	65 (18)	72 (22)	84 (29)	93 (34)	98 (37)	102 (39)	104 (40)	99 (37)	92 (33)	72 (22)	57 (14)	104 (40)
Mean maximum °F (°C)	49.0 (9.4)	55.5 (13.1)	65.1 (18.4)	74.3 (23.5)	82.3 (27.9)	88.4 (31.3)	93.1 (33.9)	94.8 (34.9)	90.0 (32.2)	79.8 (26.6)	63.2 (17.3)	50.8 (10.4)	96.3 (35.7)
Mean daily maximum °F (°C)	39.2 (4.0)	44.1 (6.7)	50.4 (10.2)	56.9 (13.8)	66.4 (19.1)	75.0 (23.9)	84.9 (29.4)	84.3 (29.1)	77.5 (25.3)	63.9 (17.7)	47.9 (8.8)	38.9 (3.8)	60.8 (16.0)
Daily mean °F (°C)	28.9 (−1.7)	32.9 (0.5)	37.6 (3.1)	42.7 (5.9)	49.8 (9.9)	56.2 (13.4)	63.5 (17.5)	62.4 (16.9)	55.9 (13.3)	45.7 (7.6)	35.9 (2.2)	28.9 (−1.7)	45.0 (7.2)
Mean daily minimum °F (°C)	18.6 (−7.4)	21.6 (−5.8)	24.8 (−4.0)	28.4 (−2.0)	33.2 (0.7)	37.4 (3.0)	42.1 (5.6)	40.6 (4.8)	34.2 (1.2)	27.5 (−2.5)	23.8 (−4.6)	18.9 (−7.3)	29.3 (−1.5)
Mean minimum °F (°C)	2.4 (−16.4)	6.4 (−14.2)	12.2 (−11.0)	18.7 (−7.4)	23.0 (−5.0)	27.3 (−2.6)	32.8 (0.4)	32.8 (0.4)	25.1 (−3.8)	17.4 (−8.1)	9.0 (−12.8)	1.4 (−17.0)	−4.3 (−20.2)
Record low °F (°C)	−25 (−32)	−19 (−28)	−12 (−24)	12 (−11)	14 (−10)	21 (−6)	24 (−4)	26 (−3)	17 (−8)	7 (−14)	−7 (−22)	−20 (−29)	−25 (−32)
Average precipitation inches (mm)	3.78 (96)	2.25 (57)	1.94 (49)	1.42 (36)	1.49 (38)	0.61 (15)	0.24 (6.1)	0.31 (7.9)	0.48 (12)	1.37 (35)	2.83 (72)	4.36 (111)	21.08 (535)
Average snowfall inches (cm)	13.50 (34.3)	10.00 (25.4)	7.60 (19.3)	2.50 (6.4)	0.30 (0.76)	0.00 (0.00)	0.00 (0.00)	0.00 (0.00)	0.00 (0.00)	0.10 (0.25)	7.90 (20.1)	19.10 (48.5)	61 (155.01)
Average extreme snow depth inches (cm)	18 (46)	14 (36)	10 (25)	2 (5.1)	0 (0)	0 (0)	0 (0)	0 (0)	0 (0)	0 (0)	4 (10)	14 (36)	23 (58)
Average precipitation days (≥ 0.01 in)	12.8	10.5	10.9	9.8	7.9	4.1	2.1	2.6	3.4	7.5	12.1	13.8	97.5
Average snowy days (≥ 0.1 in)	6.2	4.9	4.1	1.7	0.4	0.0	0.0	0.0	0.0	0.1	2.3	7.7	27.4
Source 1: NOAA
Source 2: XMACIS2 (records, 2002-2020 monthly max/mins & snow)

Climate data for Chiloquin
Month	Jan	Feb	Mar	Apr	May	Jun	Jul	Aug	Sep	Oct	Nov	Dec	Year
Record high °F (°C)	56 (13)	64 (18)	72 (22)	84 (29)	93 (34)	98 (37)	102 (39)	104 (40)	99 (37)	86 (30)	70 (21)	57 (14)	104 (40)
Mean daily maximum °F (°C)	37.9 (3.3)	42.4 (5.8)	49.3 (9.6)	56.2 (13.4)	65 (18)	73.4 (23.0)	82.3 (27.9)	82 (28)	75.2 (24.0)	62.9 (17.2)	46 (8)	37.7 (3.2)	59.2 (15.1)
Mean daily minimum °F (°C)	19.2 (−7.1)	21.1 (−6.1)	25.7 (−3.5)	28.9 (−1.7)	33.3 (0.7)	38.1 (3.4)	42.7 (5.9)	41.8 (5.4)	35.2 (1.8)	28.7 (−1.8)	24.3 (−4.3)	19.8 (−6.8)	29.9 (−1.2)
Record low °F (°C)	−11 (−24)	−19 (−28)	−1 (−18)	12 (−11)	14 (−10)	23 (−5)	28 (−2)	26 (−3)	15 (−9)	0 (−18)	−7 (−22)	−18 (−28)	−19 (−28)
Average precipitation inches (mm)	3.16 (80)	2.27 (58)	2.03 (52)	1.4 (36)	1.34 (34)	0.69 (18)	0.48 (12)	0.46 (12)	0.56 (14)	1.12 (28)	2.81 (71)	3.92 (100)	20.21 (513)
Average snowfall inches (cm)	17.5 (44)	10.5 (27)	7 (18)	2.4 (6.1)	0.2 (0.51)	0 (0)	0 (0)	0 (0)	0 (0)	0.4 (1.0)	8.1 (21)	19.8 (50)	66 (170)
Average precipitation days	12	11	11	9	7	5	3	3	4	6	12	13	96

== Demographics ==
Historical population
Census	Pop.	Note	%±
1880	150		—
1920	160		—
1930	481		200.6%
1940	741		54.1%
1950	688		−7.2%
1960	945		37.4%
1970	826		−12.6%
1980	778		−5.8%
1990	673		−13.5%
2000	716		6.4%
2010	734		2.5%
2020	767		4.5%
Source: U.S. Decennial Census

=== 2020 census ===
As of the 2020 census, Chiloquin had a population of 767. The median age was 39.3 years. 25.2% of residents were under the age of 18 and 21.9% of residents were 65 years of age or older.

For every 100 females there were 96.7 males, and for every 100 females age 18 and over there were 94.6 males age 18 and over.

0% of residents lived in urban areas, while 100.0% lived in rural areas.

There were 301 households in Chiloquin, of which 33.6% had children under the age of 18 living in them. Of all households, 32.9% were married-couple households, 26.6% were households with a male householder and no spouse or partner present, and 33.2% were households with a female householder and no spouse or partner present. About 27.3% of all households were made up of individuals and 12.3% had someone living alone who was 65 years of age or older.

There were 358 housing units, of which 15.9% were vacant. Among occupied housing units, 54.8% were owner-occupied and 45.2% were renter-occupied. The homeowner vacancy rate was <0.1% and the rental vacancy rate was 6.7%.

Racial composition as of the 2020 census
Race	Number	Percent
White	280	36.5%
Black or African American	0	0%
American Indian and Alaska Native	409	53.3%
Asian	2	0.3%
Native Hawaiian and Other Pacific Islander	1	0.1%
Some other race	9	1.2%
Two or more races	66	8.6%
Hispanic or Latino (of any race)	27	3.5%

=== 2010 census ===
As of the census of 2010, there were 734 people, 281 households, and 179 families living in the city. The population density was 895.1 inhabitants per square mile (345.6/km^{2}). There were 356 housing units at an average density of 434.1 per square mile (167.6/km^{2}). The racial makeup of the city was 49.2% Native American, 40.7% White, 0.1% African American, 0.4% Asian, 0.5% from other races, and 9.0% from two or more races. Hispanic or Latino of any race were 6.5% of the population.

There were 281 households, of which 31.3% had children under the age of 18 living with them, 36.3% were married couples living together, 19.9% had a female householder with no husband present, 7.5% had a male householder with no wife present, and 36.3% were non-families. 31.0% of all households were made up of individuals, and 10.7% had someone living alone who was 65 years of age or older. The average household size was 2.61 and the average family size was 3.26.

The median age in the city was 41.9 years. 27% of residents were under the age of 18; 6.5% were between the ages of 18 and 24; 20.6% were from 25 to 44; 30.9% were from 45 to 64; and 15% were 65 years of age or older. The gender makeup of the city was 48.6% male and 51.4% female.

=== 2000 census ===
As of the census of 2000, there were 716 people, 257 households, and 173 families living in the city. The population density was 890.1 inhabitants per square mile (343.7/km^{2}). There were 290 housing units at an average density of 360.5 per square mile (139.2/km^{2}). According to responses provided by Chiloquin residents who participated in the census, the demographic makeup of the city was 51.54% Native American, 42.60% White, 5.31% Hispanic or Latino of any race, 0.14% Asian, and 1.26% from other races. About 4.5% were from two or more races.

There were 257 households, out of which 40.5% had children under the age of 18 living with them, 39.3% were married couples living together, 21.4% had a female householder with no husband present, 32.3% were non-families, 24.1% were made up of individuals, and 10.1% had someone living alone who was 65 years of age or older. The average household size was 2.79 and the average family size was 3.34.

The age distribution was 34.9% under the age of 18, 7.0% from 18 to 24, 23.6% from 25 to 44, 22.8% from 45 to 64, and 11.7% who were 65 years of age or older. The median age was 34 years. For every 100 females, there were 102.3 males. For every 100 females age 18 and over, there were 92.6 males.

The median income for a household in the city was $20,688, and the median income for a family was $21,250. Males had a median income of $29,167 versus $18,750 for females. The per capita income for the city was $9,604. About 33.5% of families and 31.2% of the population were below the poverty line, including 42.3% of those under age 18 and 5.7% of those age 65 or over.

== Economy ==
As of 2002, the four largest employers in Chiloquin were Weyerhaeuser (plywood, pressed board), Jeld-Wen (windows, door frames), Klamath Tribes (management, health services), and Klamath County Schools.

== Education ==
It is within the Klamath County School District. Chiloquin High School, for students in grades 7 through 12, is in the city, as is Chiloquin Elementary, for students in kindergarten through grade 6.

It is in the territory of Klamath Community College.

== Points of interest ==
The Train Mountain Miniature Railroad in Chiloquin is, according to the Guinness Book of World Records, the longest hobby railway system in the world. It includes a railway museum, 25 miles (40 km) of total track, and trains that a person can straddle and ride.

Collier Memorial State Park is about 3 miles (5 km) north of Chiloquin along Route 97. Kla-Mo-Ya Casino and Travel Center, owned and operated by the Klamath Tribes, is about 2 miles (3 km) south of Chiloquin along Route 97.

== Transportation ==
- Chiloquin State Airport
