= Oregon Route 422 =

State highway in Klamath County, Oregon, US

Oregon Route 422
- OR 422 highlighted in red and OR 422S in blue

Route information
- Maintained by ODOT
- Length: 5.29 mi (8.51 km)
- Existed: 2002–present

Major junctions
- West end: Modoc Point Road near Klamath Agency
- OR 62 near Klamath Agency; US 97 near Chiloquin
- East end: US 97 near Chiloquin

Location
- Country: United States
- State: Oregon
- County: Klamath

Highway system
- Oregon Highways; Interstate; US; State; Named; Scenic
← OR 414	→ OR 429

Oregon Route 422 (OR 422) is an Oregon state highway running from Modoc Point Road near Klamath Agency to US 97 near Chiloquin. OR 422 is known as the Chiloquin Highway No. 422 (see Oregon highways and routes). It is 5 miles (8.0 km) long and runs east–west, entirely within Klamath County.

OR 422 was established in 2002 as part of Oregon's project to assign route numbers to highways that previously were not assigned. The route is mentioned on signage along U.S. 97, but no signage exists on OR 422 itself or at its junction with OR 62 as of July 2017.

OR 422 has an unsigned spur in Chiloquin, which runs 0.19 miles (0.31 km).

== Route description ==
OR 422 begins at an intersection with Modoc Point Road approximately one mile south of Klamath Agency and heads east, crossing OR 62 0.16 miles (0.26 km) east of the start of the route. OR 422 then continues east, crossing US 97 approximately 1-mile (1.6 km) west of Chiloquin and turning southeast into Chiloquin. At the intersection of Chocktoot Street and Chiloquin Road in Chiloquin, OR 422S heads southeast along Chocktoot Street and OR 422 turns southwest along Chiloquin Road, ending at an intersection with US 97 approximately 0.60 miles (0.97 km) beyond the city limits.

== History ==
The Chiloquin Highway No. 422 was approved for designation as a secondary highway on November 13, 1931. It was designated on December 6, 1933. The OR 422 designation was applied to the Chiloquin Highway on May 14, 2002.

== Major intersections ==
The entire route is in Klamath County.

Location	mi	km	Destinations	Notes
	0.00	0.00	Modoc Point Road, Agency Lake	
	0.16	0.26	OR 62 – Klamath Falls, Fort Klamath, Crater Lake	
	3.30	5.31	US 97 – Klamath Falls, Chemult, Bend	Interchange
Chiloquin	4.39	7.07	OR 422S east	
	5.29	8.51	US 97 – Klamath Falls, Chemult, Bend	
1.000 mi = 1.609 km; 1.000 km = 0.621 mi

== Spur route ==
Oregon Route 422S
- Location: Chiloquin, Oregon
- Length: 0.19 mi (310 m)
- Existed: 2002–present

Oregon Route 422S (OR 422S) is a spur route of OR 422 in Chiloquin. OR 422S is known as the Chiloquin Spur No. 488. OR 422S begins at the intersection of Chocktoot Street and Chiloquin Road in Chiloquin and heads southeast, ending just past the Williamson River.
