= Oregon Route 361 =

State highway in Jefferson County, Oregon, US

Oregon Route 361
- Route 361 highlighted in red

Route information
- Maintained by ODOT
- Length: 11.62 mi (18.70 km)
- Existed: 2002–present

Major junctions
- South end: US 97 near Culver
- North end: US 26 / US 97 in Madras

Location
- Country: United States
- State: Oregon
- County: Jefferson

Highway system
- Oregon Highways; Interstate; US; State; Named; Scenic
← OR 351	→ OR 370

Oregon Route 361 (OR 361) is an Oregon state highway running from US 26 and US 97 in Madras to US 97 near Culver. OR 361 is known as the Culver Highway No. 361 (see Oregon highways and routes). It is 11.62 miles (18.70 km) long and runs north–south as a half loop from US 97, entirely within Jefferson County.

OR 361 was established in 2002 as part of Oregon's project to assign route numbers to highways that previously were not assigned, and, as of July 2021, was unsigned.

== Route description ==
OR 361 begins at an intersection with US 26 and US 97 in Madras and heads south through Metolius and Culver. Approximately 2 1/2 miles south of Culver, OR 361 ends at an intersection with US 97.

== History ==
OR 361 was assigned to the Culver Highway in 2002.

== Major intersections ==
The entire route is in Jefferson County.

Location	mi	km	Destinations	Notes
Madras	0.00	0.00	US 26 / US 97 – Redmond, Bend, The Dalles, Portland	
Near Culver	11.92	19.18	US 97 – Redmond, Bend	
1.000 mi = 1.609 km; 1.000 km = 0.621 mi
