= Oregon Route 227 =

State highway in southwestern Oregon, US

Oregon Route 227
- Tiller–Trail Highway No. 230

Route information
- Maintained by ODOT
- Length: 11.25 mi (18.11 km)
- Existed: November 13, 1931–January 18, 2012

Major junctions
- South end: OR 62 in Trail
- North end: Douglas-Jackson county line

Location
- Country: United States
- State: Oregon

Highway system
- Oregon Highways; Interstate; US; State; Named; Scenic
← OR 226	→ OR 228

Oregon Route 227 was an American state highway which originally ran from the city of Canyonville, Oregon to the community of Trail. In 1985, the highway was truncated at the Douglas–Jackson county line; only the southern section remained under state control. It was known as the Tiller–Trail Highway No. 230 (see Oregon highways and routes).

== Route description ==
OR 227 previously began, at its western terminus, at an interchange with Interstate 5 and Oregon Route 99 in Canyonville. It headed east from there, into the foothills of the southern Oregon Cascades, along the South Fork of the Umpqua River. East of the town of Tiller, it diverges from the river, and heads south. The final form of the highway began at the county line and continued southward and ended at an intersection with Oregon Route 62 in Trail.

The section from Interstate 5 to Fifth Street in Canyonville overlapped OR 99.

== Major intersections ==
The entire route is in Jackson County.

Location	mi	km	Destinations	Notes
Trail	0.00	0.00	OR 62 – Medford, Crater Lake	
	11.25	18.11	End state maintenance at the Douglas–Jackson county line	
1.000 mi = 1.609 km; 1.000 km = 0.621 mi
