= Trail, Oregon =

United States unincorporated community

- Census-designated place
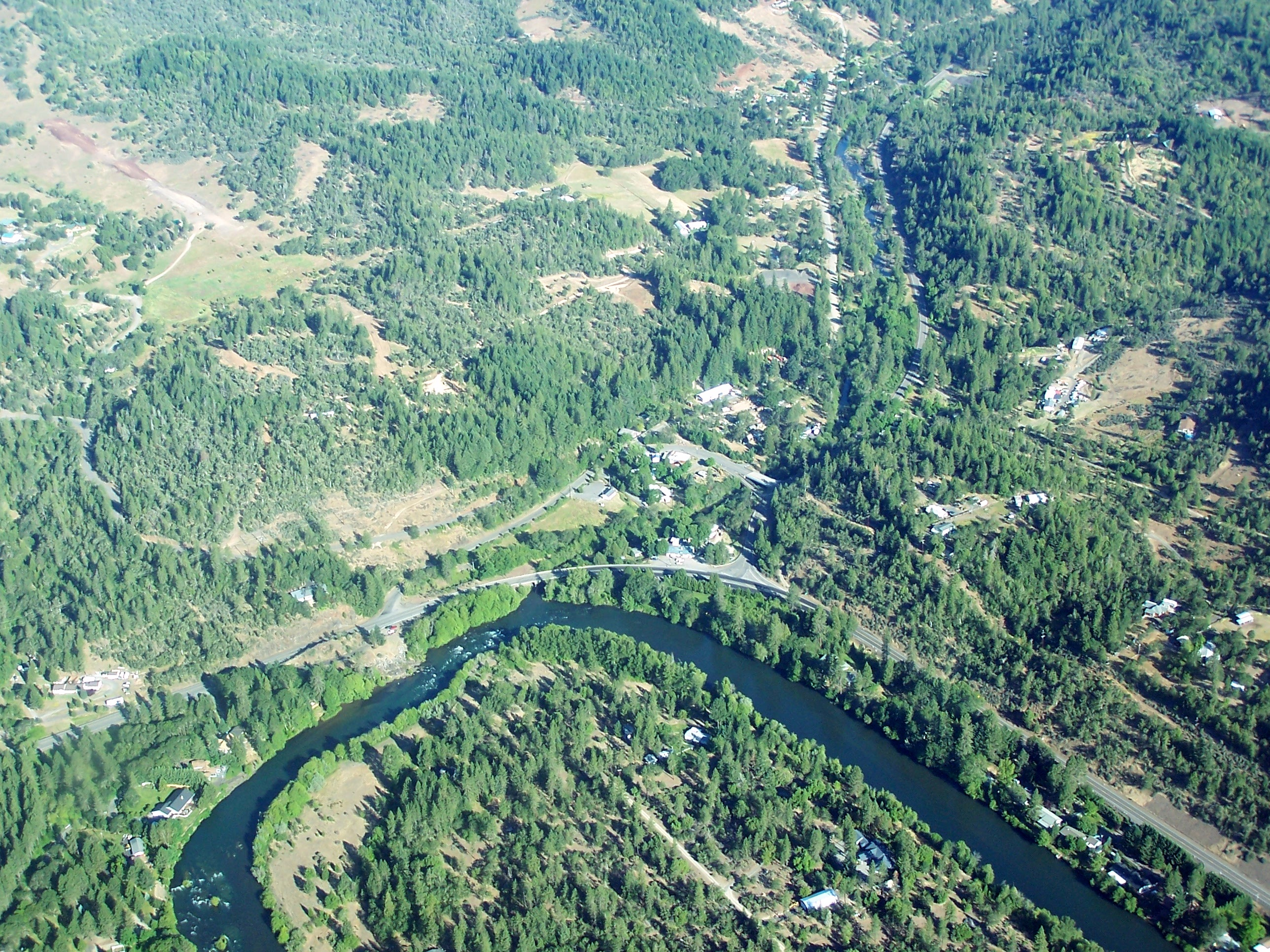
- An aerial image of Trail and the Rogue River

- Location within Oregon Location within the United States
- Coordinates: 42°39′24″N 122°48′49″W
- Country: United States
- State: Oregon
- County: Jackson

Area
  - Total: 6.88 sq mi (17.83 km^{2})
  - Land: 6.80 sq mi (17.62 km^{2})
  - Water: 0.081 sq mi (0.21 km^{2})
- Elevation: 1,693 ft (516 m)

Population (2020)
  - Total: 768
  - Density: 112.9/sq mi (43.59/km^{2})
- Time zone: UTC-8 (Pacific (PST))
  - Summer (DST): UTC-7 (PDT)
- ZIP code: 97541
- FIPS code: 41-74400
- GNIS feature ID: 2611780

Trail is a census-designated place and unincorporated community in Jackson County, Oregon, United States. As of the 2020 census, Trail had a population of 768. It has a post office with a ZIP code of 97541.

Trail lies at the intersection of Oregon Route 227 and Oregon Route 62, just north of Shady Cove and west of Lost Creek Lake, a reservoir of the Rogue River. Trail is located around the mouth of Trail Creek at the Rogue River.

== Climate ==
This region experiences warm (but not hot) and dry summers, with no average monthly temperatures above 71.6 °F. According to the Köppen Climate Classification system, Trail has a warm-summer Mediterranean climate, abbreviated "Csb" on climate maps.

== Demographics ==
Historical population
Census	Pop.	Note	%±
2020	768		—
U.S. Decennial Census
