= Kla-Mo-Ya Casino =

Tribal-owned casino in Oregon, U.S.

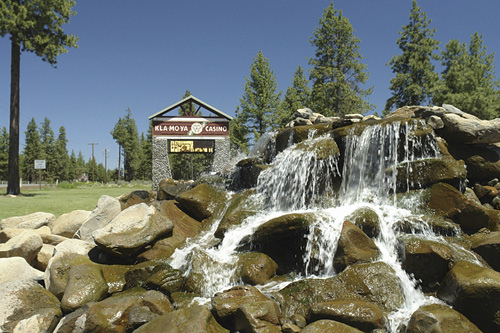
- The Kla-Mo-Ya Casino
- Interactive map of Kla-Mo-Ya Casino
- Location: Klamath County, Oregon, U.S.; 42.5356°N 121.8830°W
- Website: Official website

The Kla-Mo-Ya Casino is a tribal-owned gambling establishment located in Klamath County, Oregon, United States. Its name is derived from the name of the Klamath, Modoc, and Yahooskin tribes.

In 2010, the casino completed construction of a truck stop aimed at utilizing the north–south trucking traffic along U.S. Route 97. It includes two covered fueling stations and a small food mart. The truck stop was largely built with Klamath Tribal labor from the nearby town of Chiloquin, Oregon.

== See also ==
- Gambling in Oregon
