= Klamath people =

Native American tribe

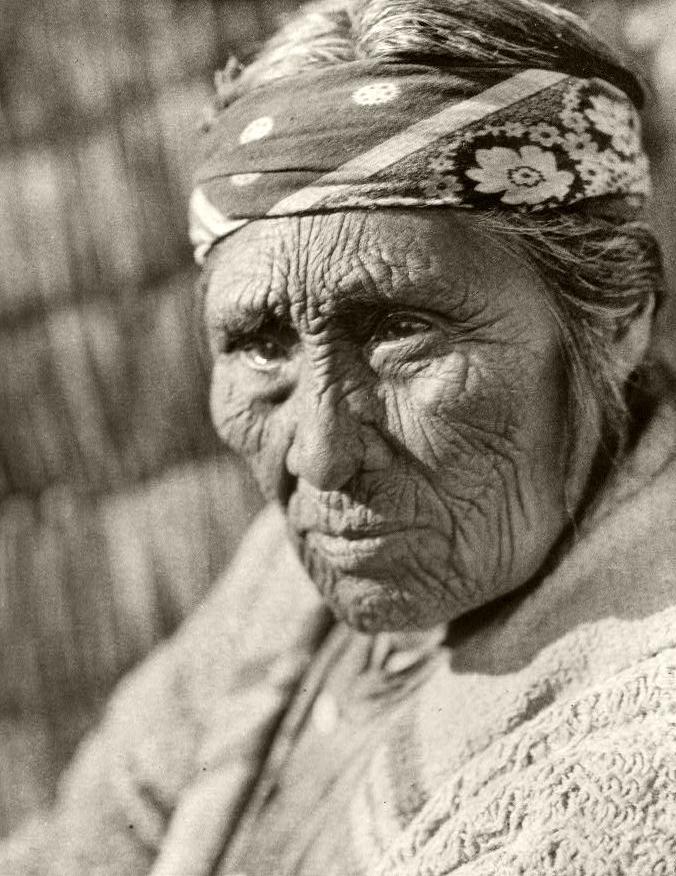
Elderly Klamath woman by Edward S. Curtis, 1924

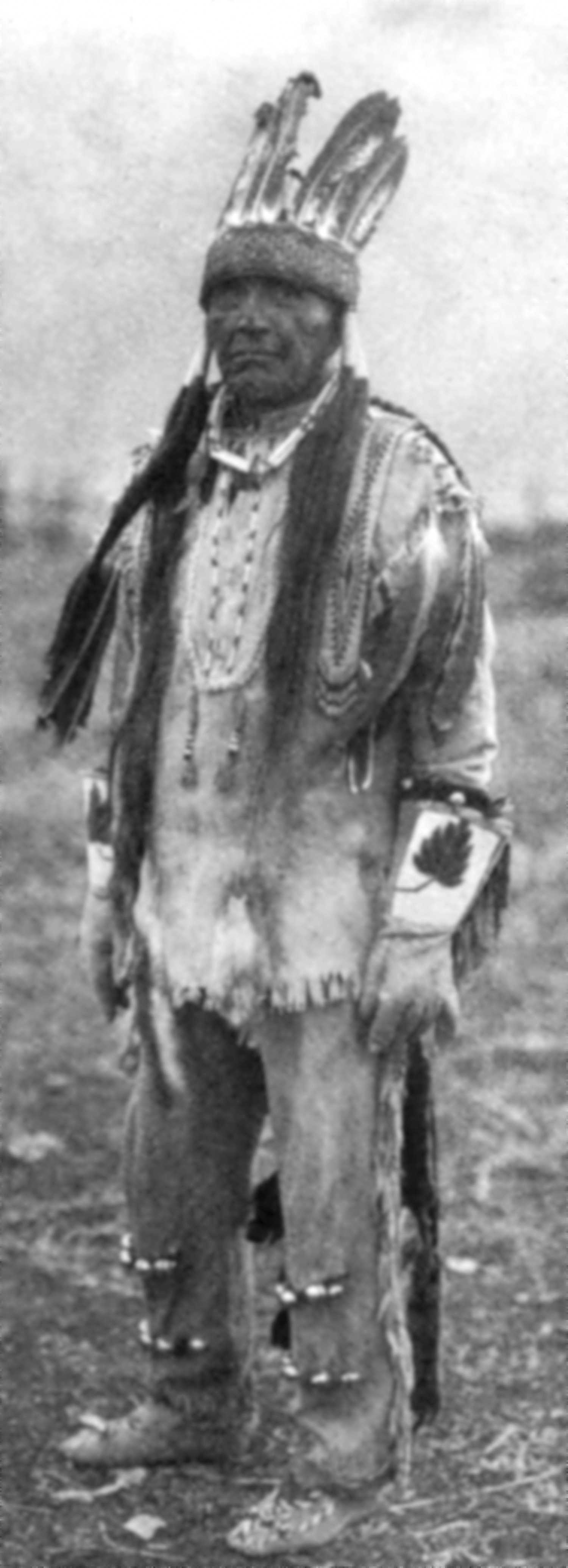
A Klamath man

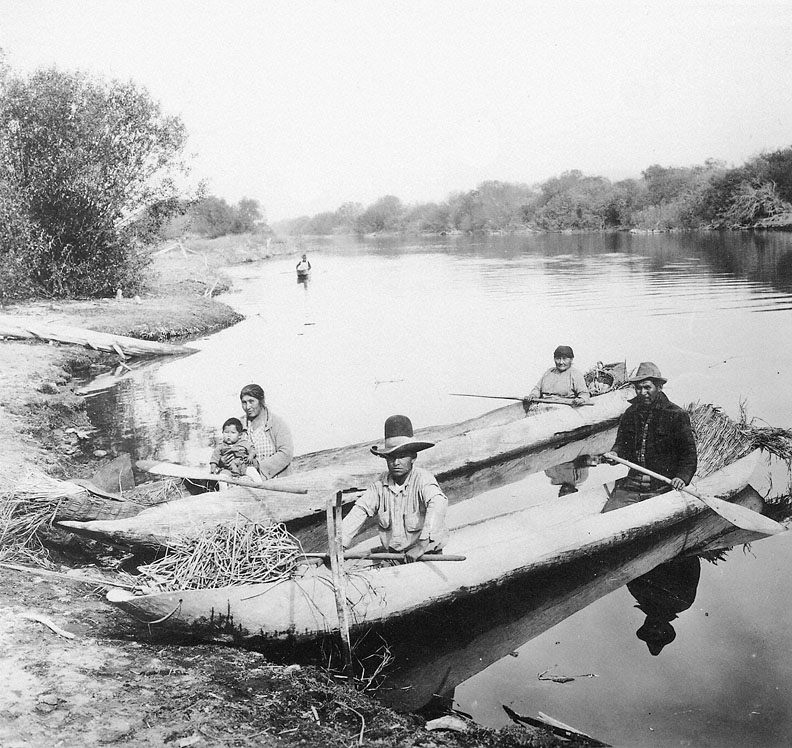
Klamath people in dugout canoes, 19th century

The Klamath people (Klamath-Modoc: ?ewksiknii) are a Native American people of the Plateau culture area in Southern Oregon and Northern California. Today Klamath people are enrolled in the federally recognized tribes:

- Klamath Tribes (Klamath, Modoc, and Yahooskin (Yahuskin) Band of Northern Paiute Indians), Oregon
- Quartz Valley Indian Community (Klamath, Karuk, and Shasta people), California.

== History ==
=== Pre-contact ===
The Klamath people lived in the area around the Upper Klamath Lake (?ews - “Lake”) and the Klamath, Williamson (ɢoɢe - “River”), Wood River (?iWqʼaaqʼnʼi ɢoɢe), and Sprague (blayknii ɢoɢe - “River Uphill”) rivers. They subsisted primarily on fish and gathered roots and seeds. While there was knowledge of their immediate neighbors, apparently the Klamath were unaware of the existence of the Pacific Ocean. Albert Gatschet has described this position as leaving the Klamath living in a "protracted isolation" from outside cultures.

North of their tribal territory lived the Molala (cagɢeenknii), in the northeast and east in the desert-like plains were various Northern Paiute bands (saad, collective term for Northern Paiute, Bannock and Northern Shoshone) - among them the Goyatöka Band ("Crayfish Eaters"), directly south their Modoc kin (moowatʼaakʼknii - "Southern People, i.e. Tule Lake People") with whom they shared the Modoc Plateau, in the southwest were living Shasta peoples (sesti maqlaqs) and the Klamath River further downstream the Karuk and Yurok (both: Skatchpalikni - "People along the Scott River"), in the west and northwest were the Latgawa ("Upland Takelma") (according to Spier: Walumskni - "Enemy" (Note: but in Klamath-Modoc ″enemy″ is shish6kish, and ″alien″ is wennikni or atikni.)) and Takelma/Dagelma ("Lowland/River Takelma") (more likely both were called: waalamksknii, waalamksknii maqlaqs - “Rogue River People”). Beyond the Cascade Range (Yámakisham yʼaynʼa - “mountains of the Northerners”) in the Rogue River Valley (Wálamsh) lived the "Rogue "River" Athabascan (Wálamsknitumi, waalamksknii maqlaqs - “Rogue River People”) and further south along the Pit River (Moatuashamkshini/moowatnii ɢoɢe - "River of the Southern Dwellers") lived the Achomawi and Atsugewi (both called: moowatwaas maqlaqs - "Southern Dweller", or "Southern People").

The Klamath were known to raid neighboring tribes, such as the Achomawi on the Pit River, and occasionally to take prisoners as slaves. They traded with the Wasco-Wishram at The Dalles. However, scholars such as Alfred L. Kroeber and Leslie Spier consider these slaving raids by the Klamath to begin only with the acquisition of the horse.

These natives made southern Oregon their home for long enough to witness the eruption of Mount Mazama. It was a volcanic mountain, believed to be the creator of Crater Lake (giiw), and now considered to be a beautiful natural formation.

=== Contact ===
In 1826, Peter Skene Ogden, an explorer for the Hudson's Bay Company, first encountered the Klamath people, and he was trading with them by 1829. The United States frontiersman Kit Carson admired their arrows, which were reported to be able to shoot through a house.

=== Treaty with the United States ===
The Klamaths, Modocs, and the Yahooskin (Yahuskin or Goyatöka) Band of Northern Paiute (Note: Erroneously called Upper Sprague River Snakes believed to be a Band of Snake Indians, the collective name given to the Northern Paiute, Bannock, and Shoshone Native American tribes.) signed a treaty with the United States in 1864, establishing the Klamath Reservation to the northeast of Upper Klamath Lake. This area was largely part of the traditional territory controlled by the ?ewksiknii Klamath band. The treaty required the tribes to cede the land in the Klamath Basin, bounded on the north by the 44th parallel, to the United States. In return, the United States was to make a lump sum payment of $35,000, and annual payments totalling $80,000 over 15 years, as well as providing infrastructure and staff for the reservation. The treaty provided that, if the Indians drank or stored intoxicating liquor on the reservation, the payments could be withheld; the United States could also locate additional tribes on the reservation in the future. The tribes requested Lindsay Applegate as the agent to represent the United States to them. The Indian agent estimated the total population of the three tribes at about 2,000 when the treaty was signed..

=== Post-treaty history ===
Since termination of recognition of their tribal sovereignty in 1954 (with federal payments not disbursed until 1961), the Klamath and neighboring tribes have reorganized their government and revived tribal identity. The Klamath, along with the Modoc and Yahooskin, have formed the federally recognized Klamath Tribes confederation. Their tribal government is based in Chiloquin, Oregon.

Some Klamath live on the Quartz Valley Indian Community in Siskiyou County, California.

== Culture ==
=== Subdivisions ===
Klamath medicine man.

Traditionally there were several cultural subdivisions among the Klamath, based on the location of their residency within the Klamath Basin. Despite this, the five recognized "tribelets" (the Klamath Tribes count six) mutually considered each other the same ethnic group, about 1,200 people in total. Like many Indigenous cultures of the Pacific Northwest, the Klamath lived a semi-sedentary life. Winter settlements were in permanent locations that were reoccupied annually. Construction of the earth-lodges would begin in Autumn, with materials salvaged from abandoned, dilapidated buildings made in previous years. Leslie Spier has detailed some of the winter settlement patterns for Klamath as follows:

The towns are not isolated, compact groups of houses, but stretch along the banks for half a mile or more. In fact, the settlements on Williamson river below the Sprague river junction form a practically continuous string of houses for five or six miles, the house pits being, in many spots, crowded close together. Informants insisted that many of these were occupied at the same time. When we consider that these earth-lodges may have housed several families, there is strong suggestion of a considerable population.

- ?ewksiknii ("Klamath Marsh People" or "Klamath Marsh-Williamson River People")
- blayknii ("Sprague River Valley People" or “Upland Klamath”, lit. “highland dwellers”)
- Kowa’cdikni ("Agency Lake/Marsh Lake People“)
- dokwaknii ("[Lower] Williamson River People“)
- gombatknii ("Pelican Bay People")
- ?iWLaLLoon?knii ("Klamath Falls (Link River) People")

=== Marriage ===
Marriage was a unique practice for the Klamath, compared to neighboring cultures found in the borderlands of modern Oregon, California, Nevada and Idaho. For example, unlike the Hupa, Karuk, and Yurok, the Klamath didn't hold formal talks between families for a bride price. Especially notable was the cultural norm that allowed wives to leave husbands, as they were "in no sense chattel ... and certainly cannot be disposed of as a possession."

=== Ethnobotany ===
The Klamath use Apocynum cannabinum as a fiber and eat the roots of Lomatium canbyi. They use the rootstocks of Sagittaria cuneata (cwa) as food. They use Carex (wicpaay), weaving the leaves into mats, using the juice of the pith as a beverage, eating the fresh stems for food and using the tuberous base of the stem for food.

=== Dentalium ===
Dentalium shells (tʼolalwʼ) were common among the Klamath prior to colonization. Compared to other native cultures, dentalium didn't hold as much financial use among the Klamath. However, longer shells were generally held to be more valuable. Nonetheless, these shells were esteemed primarily for as jewelry and personal adornment. Septum piercings were commonly given to younger members of Klamath families to allow inserting dentalium. Some individuals wouldn't however use any shells in their septum. Spier gives the following account for their usage:

The septum of the nose is pierced and the ear lobes, the latter twice or even more frequently. Both sexes insert dentalium shells horizontally through the septum ... Ear pendants are a group of four dentalia hung in a bunch by their tips.

The use of dentalium in septum piercings, in addition to other means of ornamentation, was common among the Wasco-Wishram as well.

== Classifications ==
The Klamath people are grouped with the Plateau Indians—the peoples who originally lived on the Columbia River Plateau. They were most closely linked with the Modoc people.

== Language ==
The Klamath spoke one dialect of the Klamath–Modoc language - the northern or "fi-ukshikni" dialect, the other - the "southern" dialect being spoken by the Modoc people, who lived south of the Klamath. Once thought to be a language isolate, Klamath–Modoc is now considered a member of the Plateau Penutian language family.

Both the Klamath and the Modoc called themselves maqlaqs, maqlaɢs, or Maklaks, meaning "people". When they wanted to distinguish between themselves they added -knii ("people from/of"), the Klamath were called ?ewksiknii, "people of the [Klamath] Lake", and the Modoc were called moowatdal'knii, "people of the south".

== Notable Klamath people ==
- Natalie Ball (b. 1980), interdisciplinary artist

== See also ==
- Indian Reorganization Act

== Bibliography ==
- Boyd, Robert (1996), People of the Dalles: The Indians of Wascopam Mission, Lincoln, NE: The University of Nebraska Press
- Coville, Frederick V. (1897), "Notes on the Plants used by the Klamath Indians of Oregon", Contributions from the United States National Herbarium, 5 (2), Washington, D.C.: Department of Botany: 87–110, JSTOR 480624
- Gatschet, Albert Samuel (1890), The Klamath Indians of Southwestern Oregon, Contributions to North American Ethnology. Vol. 2, Part I, Washington, DC: Government Printing Office
- Kroeber, Alfred L. (1925), Handbook of the Indians of California, United States. Bureau of American Ethonology. Bulletin,78, Washington, DC: Government Printing Office
- Spier, Leslie (1930), Kroeber, Alfred L.; Lowie, Robert H. (eds.), Klamath Ethnography (PDF), Publications in American Archaeology and Ethnography, vol. 30, Berkeley: University of California Press
- Wheeler-Voegelin, Erminie (1955), "The Northern Paiute of Central Oregon: A Chapter in Treaty-Making Part 1", Ethnohistory, 2 (2), Durham, NC: Duke University Press: 95–132, doi:10.2307/480624, JSTOR 480624
