= U.S. Route 97 in Oregon =

Highway in Oregon

U.S. Highway 97
- US 97 highlighted in red

Route information
- Maintained by ODOT
- Length: 289.31 mi (465.60 km)
- Existed: 1930s–present

Major junctions
- South end: US 97 at California state line
- OR 66 in Klamath Falls; OR 140 in Klamath Falls; OR 58 near Chemult; US 20 in Bend; OR 126 in Redmond; US 26 in Madras; US 197 near Shaniko; I-84 / US 30 in Biggs Junction
- North end: US 97 at Washington state line

Location
- Country: United States
- State: Oregon
- Counties: Klamath, Deschutes, Jefferson, Wasco, Sherman

Highway system
- United States Numbered Highway System; List; Special; Divided; Oregon Highways; Interstate; US; State; Named; Scenic
← US 95	→ US 99

U.S. Route 97 (US 97) in the U.S. state of Oregon is a major north–south United States highway which runs from the California border, south of Klamath Falls, to the Washington border on the Columbia River, between Biggs Junction, Oregon and Maryhill, Washington. Other than the northernmost stretch (which is known as the Sherman Highway), US 97 (along with US 197) is known as The Dalles-California Highway. In May 2009, Oregon Senate passed a bill to rename US 97 as "World War II Veterans Historic Highway".

With the exception of Interstate 5 (I-5), US 97 is the most important north–south highway corridor in the state. It serves two major population centers (Klamath Falls and Bend), and is the main corridor east of the Cascade Mountains. While much of the highway remains in two-lane undivided configuration, significant sections have been upgraded to expressway or freeway status.

== Route description ==
The run of US 97 in Oregon (running from south to north) starts at the border between Oregon and California, south of the city of Klamath Falls. The highway starts out as a two-lane road, running through the arid Klamath River basin. The road passes through Worden and Midland before arriving at Klamath Falls. Approaching the city of Klamath Falls, 97 becomes a freeway just south of the junction with OR 140 and OR 66. The freeway then runs along the western edge of the downtown region, ending at an interchange with Oregon Route 39 near the Oregon Institute of Technology. Within Klamath Falls is a business route, which runs through downtown via Main Street/Klamath Avenue and Esplanade Avenue, then which turns back to the US 97 mainline via the East Side Bypass (this latter segment co-signed with OR 39). This section of Highway 97 has been identified as an important alternative to I-5 for traffic in the Medford area in the event of a major earthquake in the region. Various proposals have also identified US 97 as a potential freeway corridor.

Highway 97, once again primarily a two-lane road, continues north along the eastern shore of Upper Klamath Lake. In the town of Chiloquin is an intersection with Oregon Route 62, which provides access to Crater Lake National Park from the southeast; further north is an interchange with Oregon Route 138 which provides access to the park from the northeast. Continuing north, near the town of Chemult is an interchange with Oregon Route 58, which heads northwest to Eugene and the Willamette Valley.

In La Pine is a junction with Oregon Route 31; this city marks the start of the Deschutes River recreation area; (Crane Prairie Reservoir, the river's source, is located due west of La Pine). North of La Pine, the highway becomes an expressway as it passes by the resort community of Sunriver and heads towards the city of Bend. It travels through the city on the Bend Parkway, an expressway with right-in, right-out access and full interchanges. US 97 crosses over US 20 north of downtown Bend and continues northeast from the city.

North of Bend, the highway continues as an expressway until it reaches the city of Redmond. US 97 bypasses the downtown area with a 65-mile-per-hour (105 km/h) speed limit on the northern section of this parkway. In Redmond is a short concurrency with Oregon Route 126. Continuing north out of Redmond, one enters a high desert region marked by numerous deep river gorges, including the Crooked River gorge (which 97 passes over near the Peter Skene Ogden State Scenic Viewpoint and rest area). Towns along the route include Terrebonne, which provides access to Smith Rock State Park, a climbing mecca, and Culver. North of Culver, the highway enters the agricultural community of Madras.

South of Madras is an intersection with U.S. Route 26 headed eastbound; the two routes share an alignment through the city. On the northern edge of town, 97 forks off to the right, heading northeast; and 26 continues northwest towards Portland. The importance of 97 as a transportation corridor diminishes north of Madras, as most traffic continues to Portland.

South of the community of Shaniko, US 97 forks off its only spur route, U.S. Route 197 which continues heading parallel to the Deschutes River towards Tygh Valley and The Dalles. Route 97 takes a more easterly course, passing through the high desert region of the Columbia Plateau. Towns along the route include Grass Valley and Wasco. Just south of Biggs Junction, the highway descends from the plateau into the Columbia River Gorge. In Biggs is an interchange with Interstate 84 and U.S. Route 30; immediately north of the interchange is the Biggs Rapids-Sam Hill Bridge over the Columbia River. The river serves as the state line between Oregon and Washington. Work on US 97 near Biggs in 1966 led to the discovery of the Biggs jasper, a sought-after gemstone.

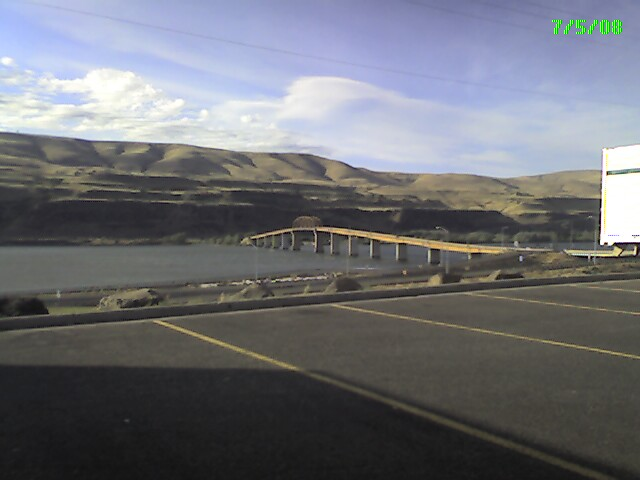
US 97 carried over the Columbia River by the Sam Hill Memorial Bridge, seen from Biggs Junction

=== Highways comprised ===
US 97 comprises the following highways (see Oregon highways and routes), from south to north:

- Part of The Dalles-California Highway No. 4; and
- The Sherman Highway No. 42.

It was also designated as the World War II Veterans Historic Highway in 2009, primarily because it connected several training facilities used by the military during the war.

US 97 Business in Klamath Falls, from south to north, comprises:

- Part of the Klamath Falls-Lakeview Highway No. 20 concurrent with Oregon Route 39;
- The Esplanade Spur, concurrent with Oregon Route 39; and
- Part of the Klamath Falls-Malin Highway No. 50.

US 97 Business in Bend runs from its intersection with the main highway at East 1st Street north of Bend, south on East 1st Street, Deschutes Place, and Wall Street to Newport Avenue, concurrent with U.S. 20 Business, then continues south on a Wall Street-Bond Street couplet and east on Franklin Avenue until it rejoins the main highway at East 3rd Street.

== History ==
US 97 was established in 1926 as part of the initial United States Numbered Highway System approved by the American Association of State Highway Officials (now AASHTO). It gained an auxiliary route, US 197, that was created on October 21, 1951.

The Bend section of US 97 was moved to the Bend Parkway in November 2001, replacing a parallel alignment on 3rd Street that now carries a signed business route. It was one of several options studied to address increased through traffic in Bend, including full bypasses and a one-way couplet on various streets. The AASHTO formally approved the relocation of US 97 onto the Bend Parkway in 2010, along with the creation of US 97 Business.

The expressway was extended towards Sunriver with the construction of additional interchanges and a four-lane highway that opened through the Newberry National Volcanic Monument in 2011. The parkway has a signed speed limit of 45 miles per hour (72 km/h), narrow shoulders that serve as bicycle lanes, pedestrian crossings, and several right-in, right-out and signalized intersections. These features are planned to be replaced with full grade separation in response to high collision rates on the Bend Parkway. Similar upgrades are possible at the northern boundary of Bend, dependent upon funding availability and state approval. The busiest part of US 97 is in Bend, with an average of 42,000 cars a day. This is also the busiest section of road in Oregon east of the Cascade Mountains.

A bypass of downtown Redmond was opened in April 2008 at a cost of $90 million, moving US 97 to the east side of downtown Redmond. Plans for other bypasses in La Pine and Madras, as well as four-laning the entire highway in Oregon, have been proposed but not funded by the state government. In 2013, the cost of upgrading all of US 97 to a four-lane highway with limited access was estimated to be $10 billion.

A planned realignment of US 97 near La Pine was scrapped during construction in the late 2010s due to unstable soil conditions. A four-lane overpass at Wickiup Junction would replace the last remaining at-grade railroad crossing on US 97 and was approved by ODOT in 2014 with $17 million in funding. Construction began in March 2016 and was delayed for several months during the installation of steel beams for the overpass in August, which fell while being lifted into place. Work was halted in May 2017 after the overpass and embankments had sunk over the winter months by as much as 18 inches (46 cm). A geotechnical survey found that the overpass site was over a layer of unstable soil created by a lake formed 10,000 years before present by a volcanic eruption that dammed the Deschutes River. The layer also had the uncompressed remains of diatoms, which would prevent a reliable estimation of how the soils would settle. The Oregon Transportation Commission shut down the project in October 2017 and redirected $3 million of the unspent funds to other safety improvements for US 97 in La Pine. ODOT contractors removed the overpass's steel girders in late 2018, leaving the embankments and retaining walls in place.

Through Bend, a portion of US 97 from US 20 to north of Cooley Road was rerouted onto a new alignment in August 2024. US 97 throughout Bend is a freeway with the completion.

== Major intersections ==
Mileposts are measured from north to south. They do not reflect actual mileage due to realignments.

County	Location	mi	km	Exit	Destinations	Notes
Klamath		291.73	469.49		US 97 south – Weed, San Francisco	Continuation into California
Klamath		282.87	455.24		Merrill, Malin	Former Lower Klamath Highway No. 423
Klamath		280.16	450.87		Miller Island Road (Midland Highway No. 420)	
Klamath	Klamath Falls	277.47	446.54	Southern end of freeway		
Klamath	Klamath Falls	277.13	446.00	277	OR 66 / OR 140 – Lakeview, Medford	
Klamath	Klamath Falls	276.74	445.37		Green Springs Drive	Northbound exit only
Klamath	Klamath Falls	275.06	442.67	275	US 97 Bus. north – Klamath Falls City Center	
Klamath	Klamath Falls	273.62	440.35		Oregon Avenue, Lakeshore Drive	
Klamath	Klamath Falls	272.79	439.01		US 97 Bus. south / OR 39 south – Klamath Falls, Reno, Oregon Institute of Technology, Winema National Forest Headquarters	No southbound entrance
Klamath	Klamath Falls	272.56	438.64	Northern end of freeway		
Klamath	Modoc Point	257.83	414.94		Modoc Point Road	Former Modoc Point Highway No. 427
Klamath	Lobert Junction	251.74	405.14		OR 62 west – Fort Klamath, Crater Lake	
Klamath		249.08	400.86		OR 422 west – Chiloquin, Sprague River	
Klamath		247.54	398.38	247	OR 422 – Chiloquin, Crater Lake	Interchange
Klamath	Mazama Junction	216.12	347.81		Sun Mountain Road	Former Sun Mountain Highway No. 428
Klamath	Diamond Lake Junction	213.09	342.94		OR 138 west (North Umpqua Highway) – Diamond Lake, Roseburg, Medford	
Klamath		195.05	313.90		OR 58 west – Oakridge, Eugene	Interchange
Deschutes		169.68	273.07		OR 31 south – Silver Lake, Lakeview, Reno	
Deschutes		153.08	246.36	153	Century Drive Highway No. 372 south – Sunriver	Interchange
Deschutes		151.30	243.49	151	Cottonwood Road	Interchange
Deschutes		143.45	230.86	143	Baker Road / Knott Road	Interchange
Deschutes	Bend	140.87	226.71	141	US 97 Bus. north (3rd Street) to US 20 east – Burns	Interchange; northbound exit and southbound entrance
Deschutes	Bend				Powers Road	Intersection with jughandles
Deschutes	Bend	139.68	224.79	Southern end of freeway		
Deschutes	Bend	139.17	223.97	139	Reed Market Road – Old Mill District	
Deschutes	Bend				Truman Avenue	southbound right-in/right-out
Deschutes	Bend	138.24	222.48	138	Downtown, Mount Bachelor	
Deschutes	Bend				Hawthorne Avenue	southbound right-in/right-out
Deschutes	Bend				Lafayette Avenue	southbound right-in/right-out
Deschutes	Bend	137.13	220.69	137	Revere Avenue – Downtown	
Deschutes	Bend	136.31	219.37	136	Butler Market Road	No northbound exit
Deschutes	Bend	135.46	218.00	135B	Empire Boulevard – State Offices	No southbound exit
Deschutes	Bend	134.97	217.21	135A	US 97 Bus. north to US 20 west – Sisters	Northbound exit and southbound entrance
Deschutes	Bend	134.97	217.21	134	US 97 Bus. south (NE 3rd Street) to US 20 – Burns	Southbound exit and northbound entrance
Deschutes	Bend	134.75	216.86	Northern end of freeway		
Deschutes	Deschutes				Deschutes Market Road / Tumalo Road	Interchange
Deschutes	Redmond	123.60	198.91	124	Airport Way / Yew Avenue – Redmond Airport	Interchange
Deschutes	Redmond	121.45	195.45		OR 126 west (US 97 Bus. north) – Sisters, Eugene, Salem, City Center	Southern end of OR 126 overlap
Deschutes	Redmond	121.21	195.07		OR 126 east (Evergreen Avenue) – Prineville, John Day	Northern end of OR 126 overlap
Deschutes	Redmond	119.17	191.79	119	US 97 Bus. south / North Canal Boulevard – North Redmond	Interchange
Deschutes		118.52	190.74		OR 370 east (O'Neil Highway) – O'Neil, Lone Pine	
Jefferson		105.73	170.16		OR 361 north – Culver, Round Butte Dam	
Jefferson		97.29	156.57		US 26 east – Prineville, Mitchell, John Day	Southern end of US 26 overlap
Jefferson	Madras	92.45	148.78		OR 361 south (D Street) – Metolius, The Cove Palisades State Park	
Jefferson	Madras	92.08	148.19		US 26 west (Northeast 5th Street) – Mount Hood, Portland	Northern end of US 26 overlap
Jefferson		74.83	120.43		OR 293 east – Antelope, John Day Fossil Beds, Fossil	
Wasco		67.17 68.66	108.10 110.50		US 197 north – Maupin, The Dalles	
Wasco	Shaniko	56.53	90.98		OR 218 east – Antelope, Fossil	
Sherman	Grass Valley	28.36	45.64		OR 216 west (Krusrow Street) – Sherars Bridge, Tygh Valley	
Sherman		10.34	16.64		Old Sherman Highway – Wasco	Former US 97 north
Sherman		8.82	14.19		OR 206 – Wasco, Condon, Fulton Canyon	Interchange
Sherman		7.50	12.07		Wasco–Heppner Highway No. 300 – Wasco	Former US 97 south
Sherman	Biggs	0.03	0.048		Celilo–Wasco Highway No. 301 – Deschutes State Park	
Sherman	Biggs Junction	−0.13	−0.21		I-84 / US 30 – The Dalles, Rufus, Pendleton	I-84 exit 104
Columbia River		−0.18– −0.43	−0.29– −0.69	Sam Hill Memorial Bridge		
Columbia River		−0.18– −0.43	−0.29– −0.69		US 97 north	Continuation into Washington
1.000 mi = 1.609 km; 1.000 km = 0.621 mi: Closed/former; Concurrency terminus; Incomplete access

== Related routes ==
=== Klamath Falls business route ===
U.S. Highway 97 Business
- Location: Klamath Falls

=== Bend business route ===
U.S. Highway 97 Business
- Location: Bend
- Existed: 2010–present

US 97 Business in Bend follows the former alignment of US 97 on 3rd Street, which was replaced by the opening of the Bend Parkway in 2001. It is partially concurrent with US 20.

=== Redmond business route ===
U.S. Highway 97 Business
- Location: Redmond
- Existed: 2008–present

US 97 Business in Redmond follows the former alignment on US 97 on a pair of one-way streets in downtown Redmond. It was replaced by the opening of an eastern bypass in 2008.

U.S. Route 97
Previous state: California	Oregon	Next state: Washington
