= Tiller, Oregon =

Unincorporated community in the state of Oregon, United States

- Unincorporated community
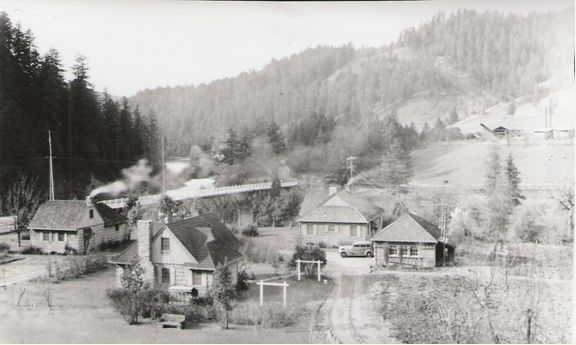
- West end of Tiller Ranger Station with Southern Oregon Sugar Pine Mill in the background, Tiller, Oregon, 1941
- Etymology: named for Aaron Tiller, who settled in the locality.
- Location within Oregon and the United States Tiller (the United States)
- Coordinates: 42°55′42″N 122°57′04″W
- Country: United States
- State: Oregon
- County: Douglas County
- Established: 1902
- Elevation: 1,089 ft (332 m)
- ZIP: 97484
- Area code: 541
- GNIS feature ID: 1151223

Tiller is an unincorporated community in Douglas County, Oregon, United States. It is located on Oregon Route 227 and the South Umpqua River, in the Umpqua National Forest.

Tiller was named for Aaron Tiller, who settled in the locality. Tiller post office was established in 1902.

Tiller is zip code 97484 in area code 541, although parts of the town are included in the zip code of neighboring Days Creek. Tiller is served by the 825 exchange.

== Purchase by Global Shopping Mall ==
In 2017, many of the town's properties were offered for sale for $3.85 million. The asking price included 257 contiguous acres encompassing most of the town's buildings as well as wooded hilltops and approximately 2 million board feet of marketable lumber. The sale did not include the community church, pastor's residence, fire station, and several other properties. After a year of negotiation, a Garden Grove, California-based company called Global Shopping Mall registered to Timothy Pham signed the deed in September 2018. In 2019, a spokesman for Pham told the Roseburg News-Review that there was not yet a "master plan" for developing the town, but the corporation hoped to develop a summer children's program in the area. On August 17, 2021, Tiller Town Corporation was incorporated as an Oregon corporation, although the owner's development plans remained unannounced.

In October 2022, local residents quoted in The Oregonian described Global Shopping Mall as "absentee business owners" and complained that blackberry vines were overtaking the abandoned buildings, causing a potential fire hazard. Reporting in The News-Review in April 2023 indicated that Global Shopping Mall was three years delinquent on property taxes for all 28 of the parcels, and that the company had been suspended by the Franchise Tax Board of California, where it had been incorporated.
