= Fu-Go balloon bomb =

WWII Japanese incendiary weapon

Fu-Go; ふ号
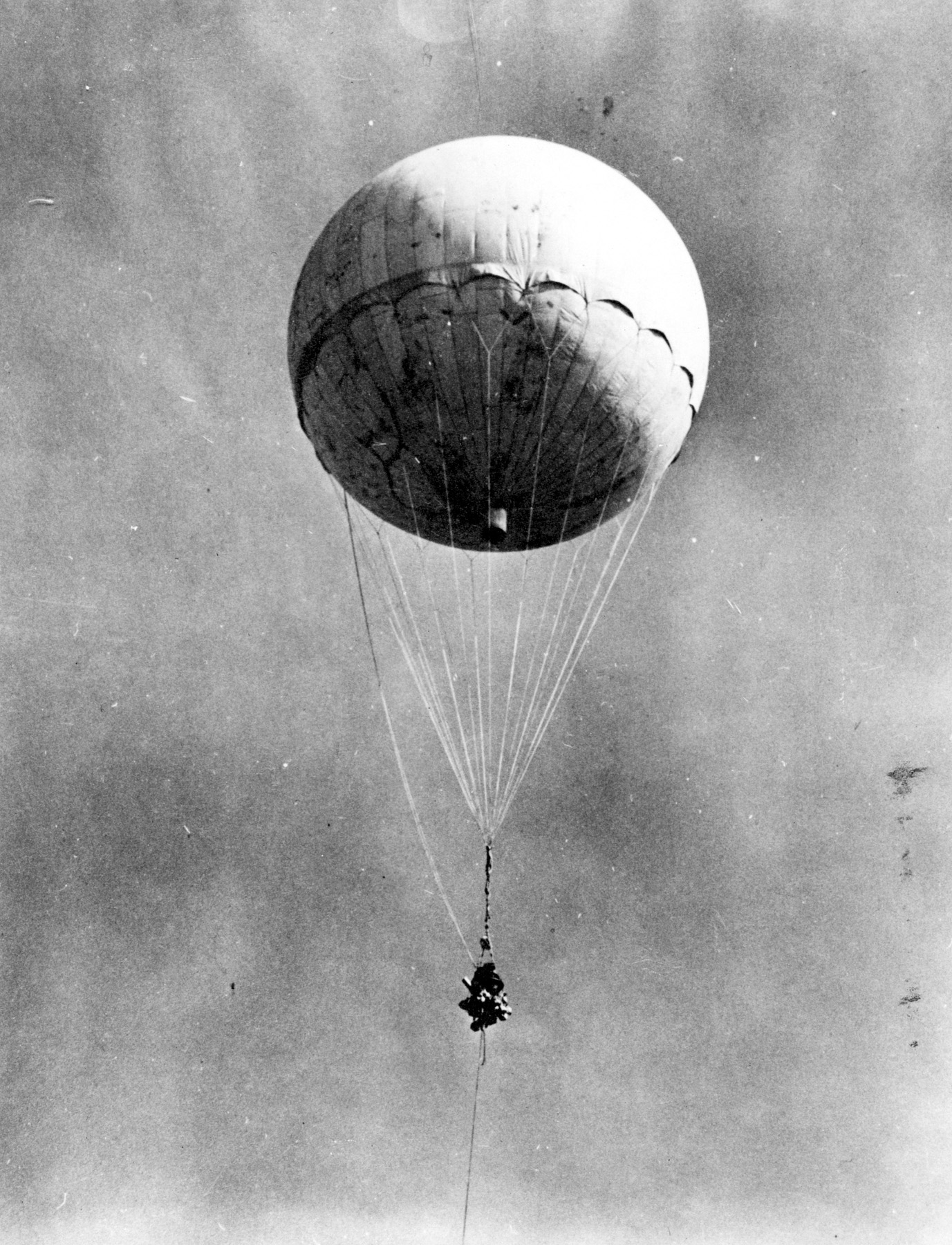
- Balloon reinflated in California, January 1945

General information
- Type: Incendiary balloon
- National origin: Japan
- Manufacturer: Imperial Japanese Army (A-Type); Imperial Japanese Navy (B-Type)
- Designer: Noborito Research Institute
- Primary user: Imperial Japanese Army
- Number built: approx. 9,300

History
- Manufactured: 1944–1945
- Introduction date: November 3, 1944
- Retired: April 20, 1945
- Variants: A-Type (paper); B-Type (rubberized silk)

Fu-Go (ふ号[兵器], fugō [heiki]; lit. "Code 'Fu' [Weapon]") was an incendiary balloon weapon (風船爆弾, fūsen bakudan; lit. "balloon bomb") deployed by Japan against the United States during World War II. It consisted of a hydrogen-filled paper balloon 33 feet (10 m) in diameter, with a payload of four 11-pound (5.0 kg) incendiary devices and one 33-pound (15 kg) high-explosive anti-personnel bomb. The uncontrolled balloons were carried over the Pacific Ocean from Japan to North America by fast, high-altitude air currents, today known as the jet stream, and used a sophisticated sandbag ballast system to maintain their altitude. The bombs were intended to ignite large-scale forest fires and spread panic.

Between November 1944 and April 1945, the Imperial Japanese Army launched about 9,300 balloons from sites on coastal Honshu, of which about 300 were found or observed in the U.S., Canada, and Mexico. The bombs were ineffective as fire starters due to damp seasonal conditions, with no forest fires being attributed to the offensive. A U.S. media censorship campaign prevented the Imperial Army from learning of the offensive's results. On May 5, 1945, six civilians were killed by one of the bombs near Bly, Oregon, becoming the war's only deaths by enemy action in the contiguous United States. The Fu-Go balloon bomb was the first weapon system with intercontinental range, predating the intercontinental ballistic missile.

== Background ==
The balloon bomb concept was developed by the Imperial Japanese Army's Ninth Technical Research Institute (also known as the Noborito Research Institute), tasked with creating special weapons. In 1933, Lieutenant General Reikichi Tada started a balloon bomb program at Noborito designated Fu-Go, (Note: Every Noborito project was assigned a code name ending with -go (号), a numbering suffix. The balloon bomb project's name was derived from fūsen (風船), the Japanese word for "balloon".) which proposed a hydrogen-filled balloon 13 feet (4.0 m) in diameter with a time fuse, capable of delivering bombs up to 70 miles (110 km). The project was not completed and stopped by 1935.

After the Doolittle Raid in April 1942, in which American planes bombed the Japanese mainland, the Imperial General Headquarters directed Noborito to develop a retaliatory bombing capability against the U.S. In mid-1942, Noborito investigated several proposals, including long-range bombers that could make one-way sorties from Japan to cities on the U.S. West Coast, and small bomb-laden seaplanes which could be launched from submarines. On September 9, 1942, the latter was tested in the Lookout Air Raid, in which a Yokosuka E14Y seaplane was launched from a submarine off the Oregon coast. Warrant Officer Nobuo Fujita dropped two large incendiary bombs in Siskiyou National Forest in the hopes of starting a forest fire and safely returned to the submarine. Response crews spotted the plane and contained the small blazes. The program was cancelled by the Imperial Navy.

Also in September 1942, Major General Sueki Kusaba, who had served under Tada in the original balloon bomb program in the 1930s, was assigned to the laboratory and revived the Fu-Go project with a focus on longer flights. The Oregon air raid, while not achieving its strategic objective, had demonstrated the potential of using unmanned balloons at a low cost to ignite large-scale forest fires. According to U.S. interviews with Japanese officials after the war, the balloon bomb campaign was undertaken "almost exclusively for home propaganda purposes", and the Army had little expectation of its effectiveness.

== Design and development ==
By March 1943, Kusaba's team developed a 20-foot (6.1 m) design capable of floating at 25,000 feet (7,600 m) for up to 30 hours. The balloons were constructed from four to five thin layers of washi, a durable paper derived from the paper mulberry (kōzo) bush, which were glued together with konnyaku (Japanese potato) paste. The Army mobilized thousands of teenage girls at high schools across the country to laminate and glue the sheets together, with final assembly and inflation tests at large indoor arenas including the Nichigeki Music Hall and Ryōgoku Kokugikan sumo hall in Tokyo. The original proposal called for night launches from submarines located 600 miles (970 km) off of the U.S. coast, a distance the balloons could cover in 10 hours. A calibrated timer would release an 11-pound (5.0 kg) incendiary bomb at the end of the flight. Two submarines (I-34 and I-35) were prepared and two hundred balloons were produced by August 1943, but attack missions were postponed due to the need for submarines as weapons and food transports.

Engineers next investigated the feasibility of balloon launches against the United States from the Japanese mainland, a distance of at least 6,000 miles (9,700 km). Engineers sought to make use of strong seasonal air currents discovered flowing from west to east at high altitude and speed over Japan, today known as the jet stream. The currents had been investigated by Japanese scientist Wasaburo Oishi in the 1920s. In late 1943, the Army consulted Hidetoshi Arakawa of the Central Meteorological Observatory, who used Oishi's data to extrapolate the air currents across the Pacific Ocean and estimate that a balloon released in winter and that maintained an altitude of 30,000 to 35,000 feet (9,100 to 10,700 m) could reach the North American continent in 30 to 100 hours. Arakawa further found that the strongest winds blew from November to March at speeds approaching 200 miles per hour (320 km/h).

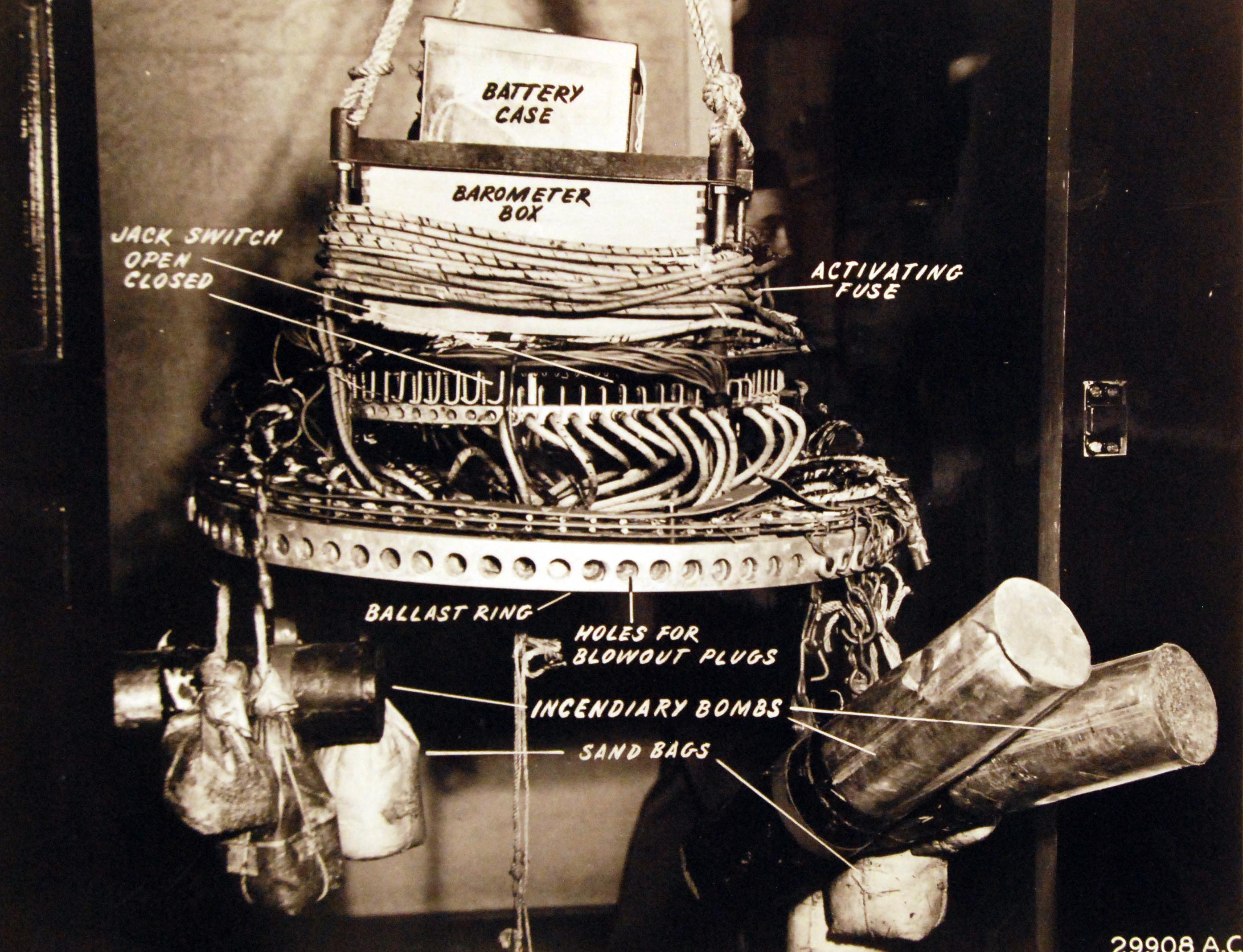
Fu-Go carriage, with labeled ring, electrical circuits, fuses, ballast, and bombs

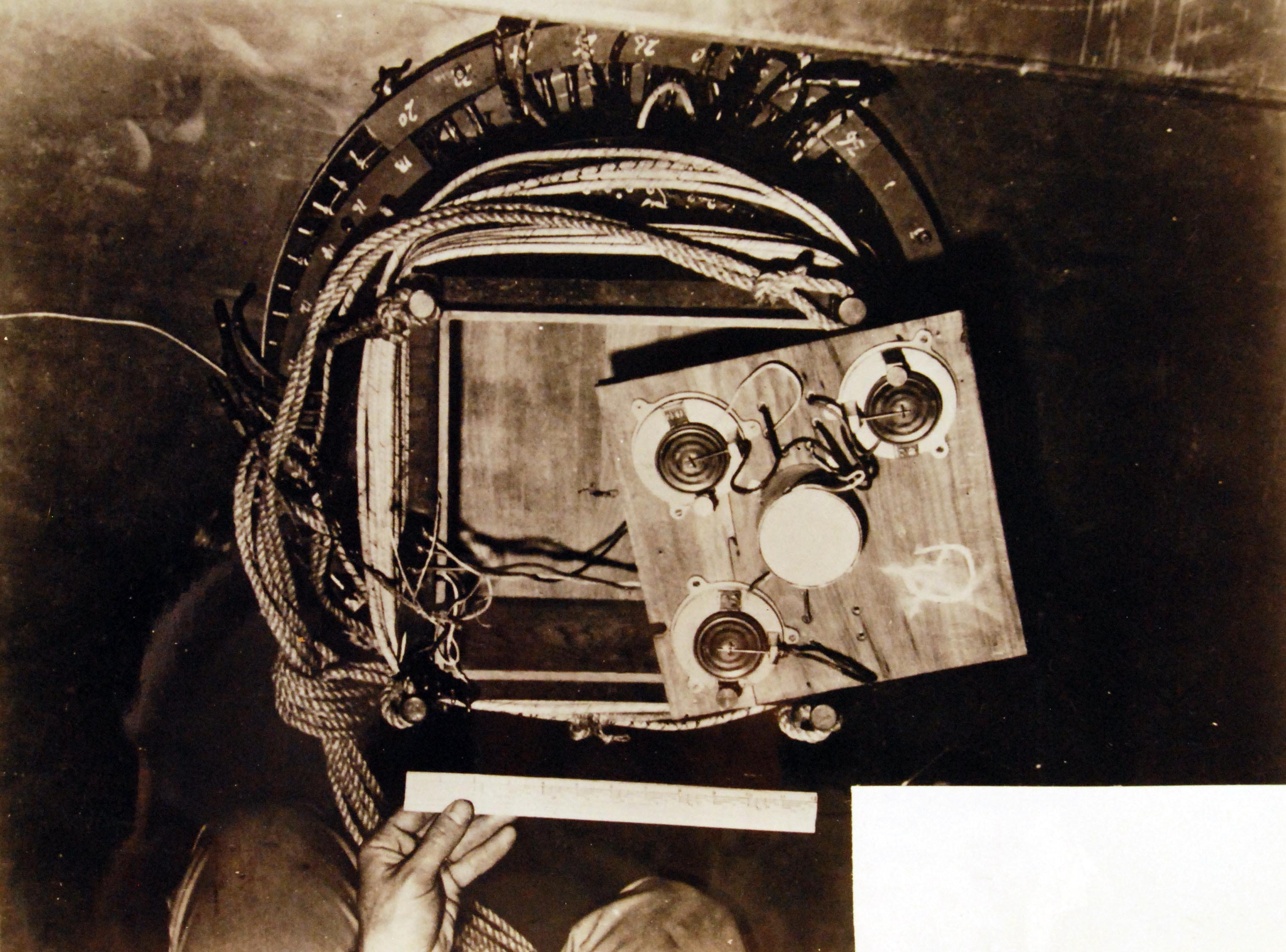
Top view of carriage assembly, with control device removed

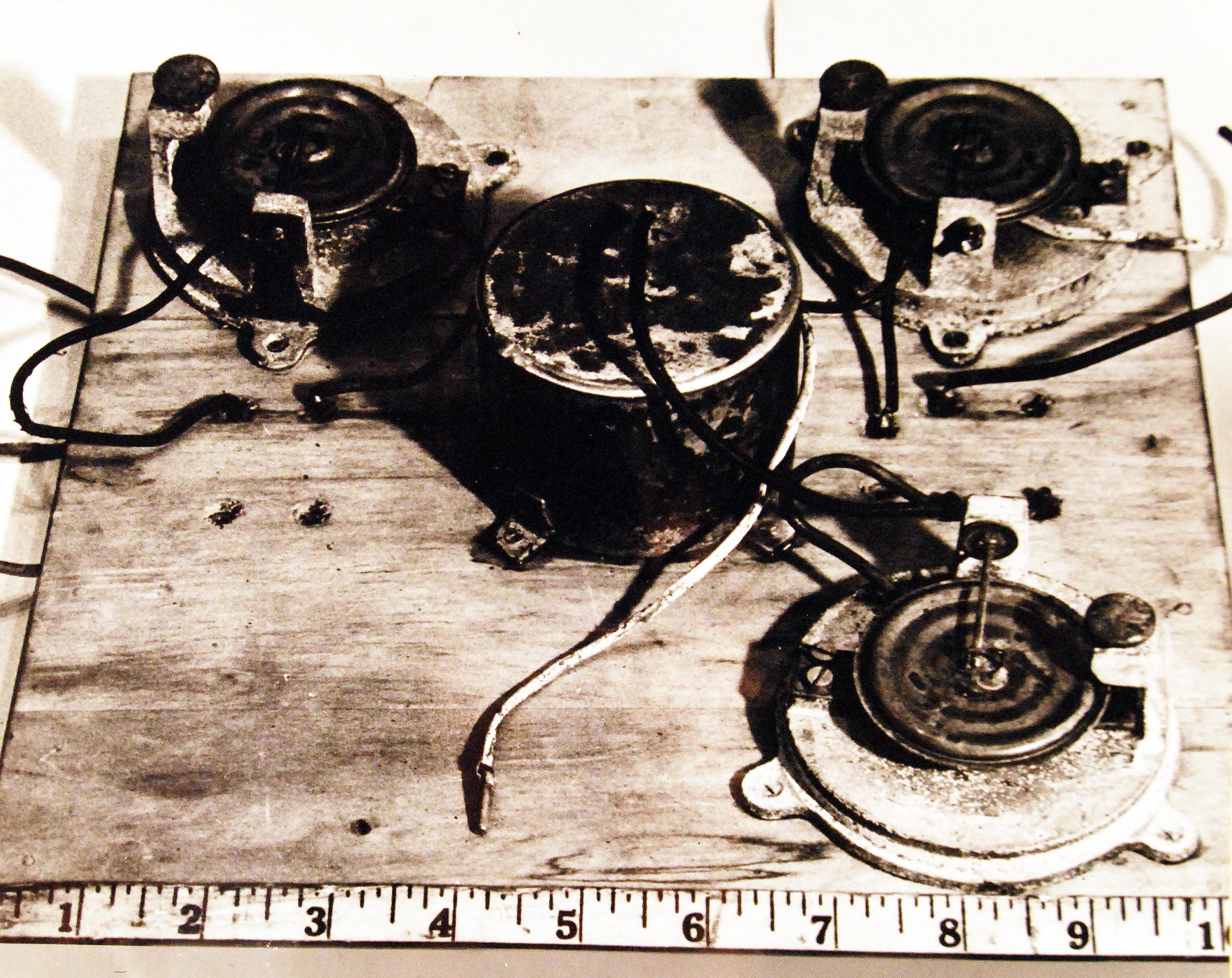
Altitude control device, with central master aneroid barometer and backups

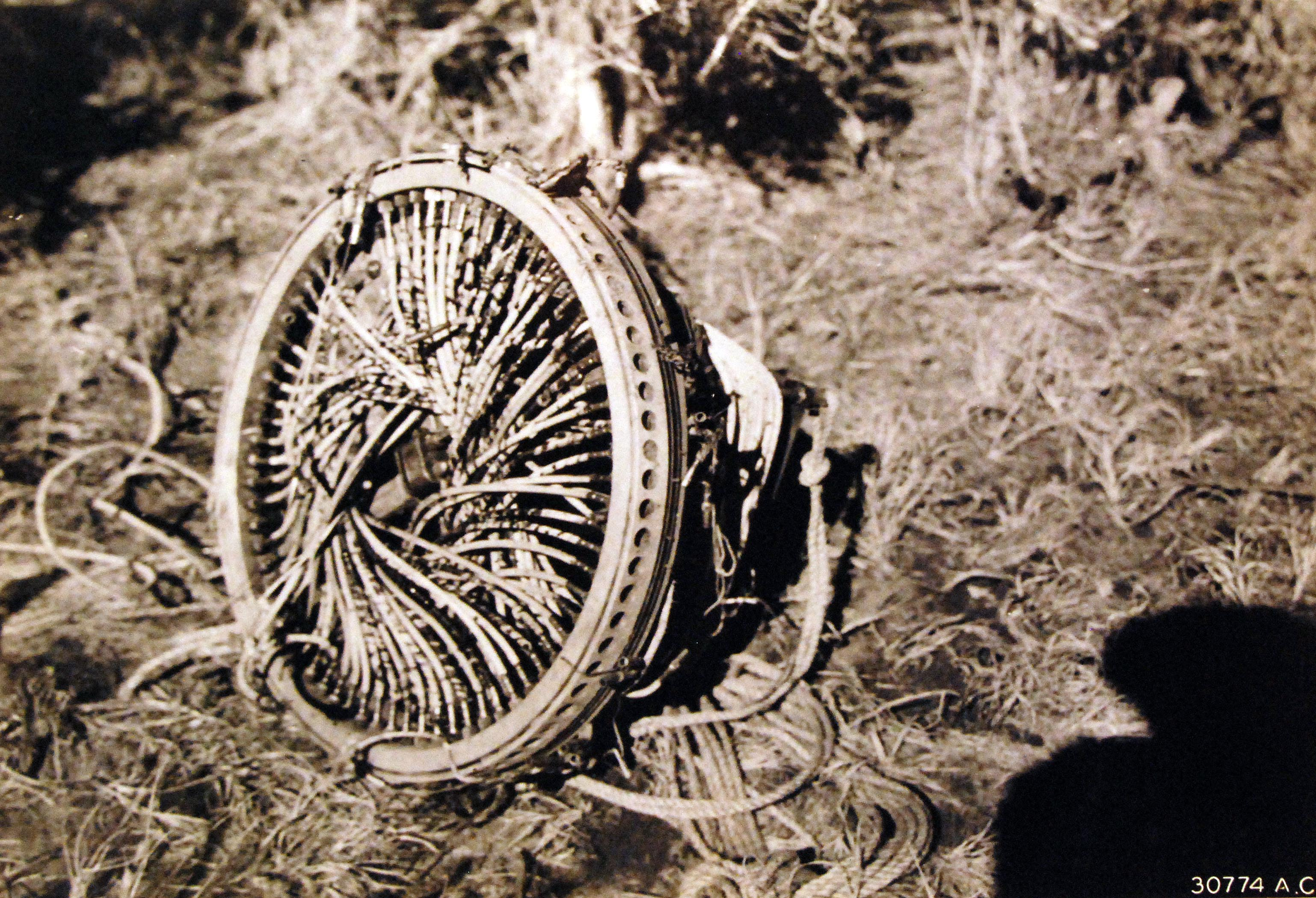
Bottom view of carriage fuses

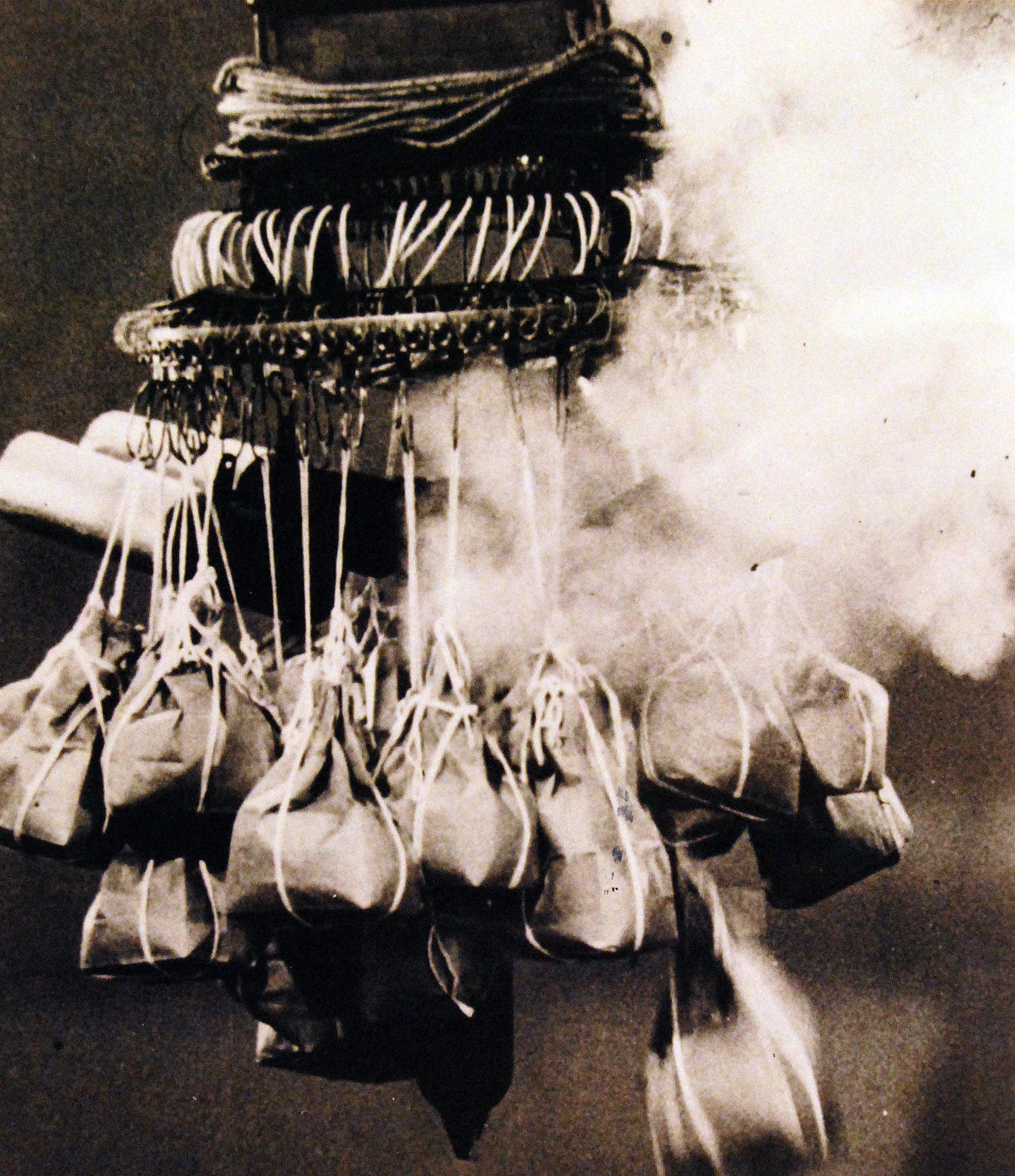
Recovered Fu-Go at the moment a blowout plug is detonated

Changing pressure levels in a fixed-volume balloon posed technical challenges. During the day, heat from the sun increased pressure, risking the balloon rising above the air currents or bursting. A relief valve was added to allow gas to escape when the envelope's internal pressure rose above a set level. At night, cool temperatures risked the balloon falling below the currents, an issue that worsened as gas was released. To resolve this, engineers developed a sophisticated ballast system with 32 sandbags mounted around a cast aluminum wheel, with each sandbag connected to gunpowder blowout plugs. The plugs were connected to three redundant aneroid barometers calibrated for an altitude between 25,000 and 27,000 feet (7,600 and 8,200 m), below which one sandbag was released; the next plug was armed two minutes after the previous plug was blown. A separate altimeter set between 13,000 and 20,000 feet (4,000 and 6,100 m) controlled the later release of the bombs. A one-hour activating fuse for the altimeters was ignited at launch, allowing the balloon time to ascend above these two thresholds. Tests of the design in August 1944 indicated success, with several balloons releasing radiosonde signals for up to 80 hours (the maximum time allowed by the batteries). A self-destruct system was added; a three-minute fuse triggered by the release of the last bomb would detonate a block of picric acid and destroy the carriage, followed by an 82-minute fuse that would ignite the hydrogen and destroy the envelope.

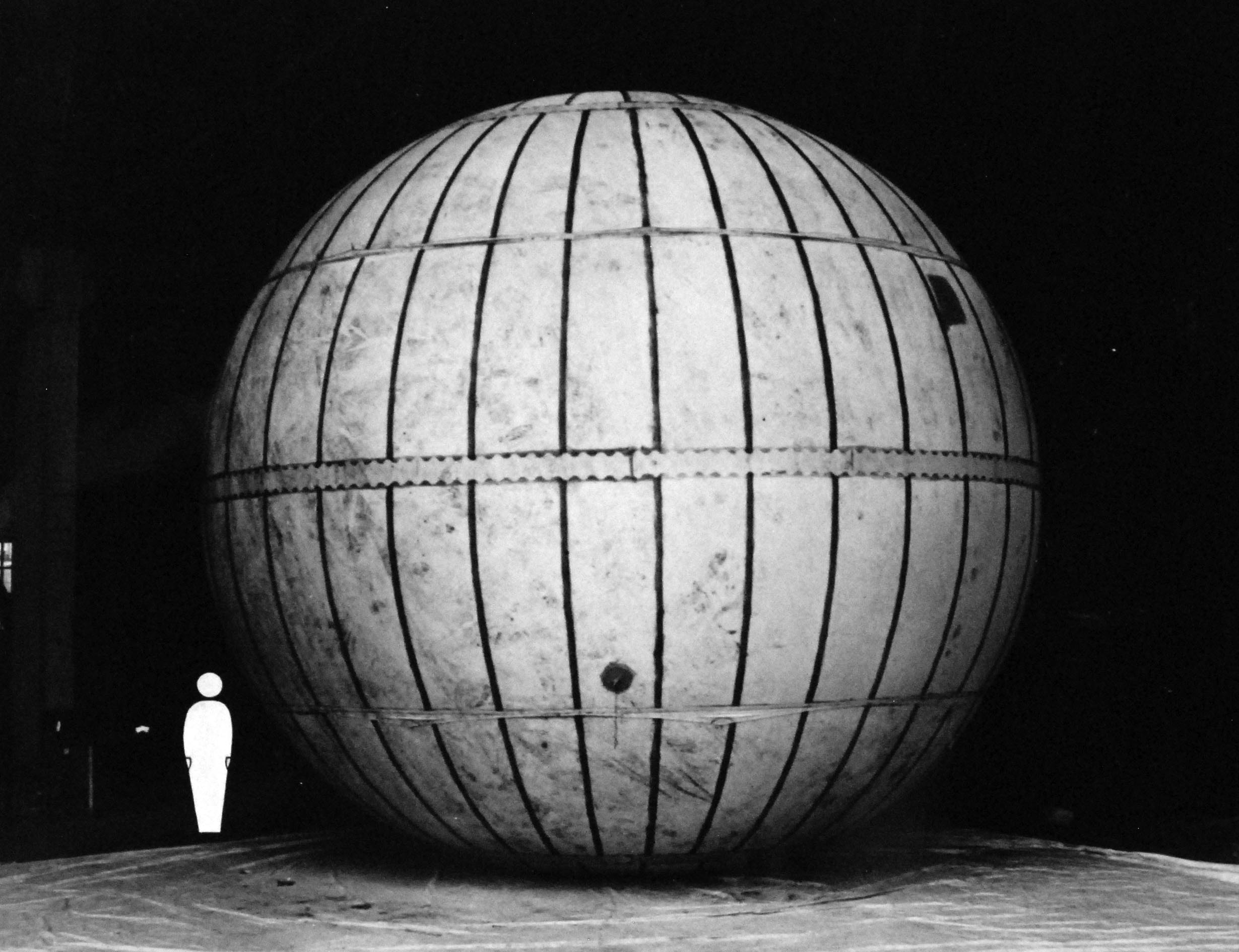
B-Type rubberized silk balloon, with outline of a human for scale

In late 1942, the Imperial General Headquarters had directed the Navy to begin its own balloon bomb program in parallel with the Army project. Lieutenant Commander Kiyoshi Tanaka headed a group which developed a 30-foot (9.1 m) rubberized silk balloon, designated the B-Type (in contrast to the Army's A-Type). The silk material was an effort to create an elastic envelope that could withstand pressure changes. The design was tested in August 1944, but the balloons burst immediately after reaching altitude, determined to be the result of faulty rubberized seams. The Navy program was subsequently consolidated under Army control, due in part to the declining availability of rubber as the war continued. The B-Type balloons were later equipped with a version of the A-Type's ballast system and tested on November 2, 1944; one of these balloons, which was not loaded with bombs, became the first to be recovered by Americans after being spotted in the water off San Pedro, California, on November 4.

The final A-Type design was 33 feet (10 m) in diameter, and had a gas volume of 19,000 cubic feet (540 m^{3}) and a lifting capacity of 300 pounds (140 kg) at operating altitude. The bomb payload most commonly carried was:

- four 11-pound (5.0 kg) thermite incendiary devices, consisting of a steel tube 16 inches (41 cm) long and 4 inches (10 cm) in diameter with a mechanical impact fuse;
- one Type 92 33-pound (15 kg) high-explosive anti-personnel bomb, containing a block of picric acid or TNT surrounded by shrapnel rings;
- or alternatively to the anti-personnel bomb, one Type 97 26-pound (12 kg) incendiary bomb, containing three magnesium containers of thermite.

== Offensive and defenses ==
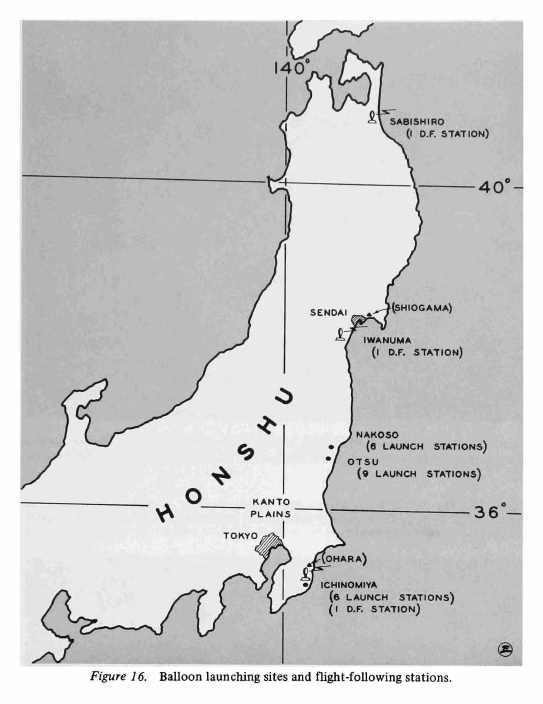
Fu-Go launching sites and flight-following stations on Honshu

A balloon launch organization of three battalions was formed. The first battalion included headquarters and three squadrons, totaling 1,500 men, at nine launch stations at Otsu in Ibaraki Prefecture. The second battalion of 700 men in three squadrons operated six launch stations at Ichinomiya, Chiba, and the third battalion of 600 men in two squadrons operated six launch stations at Nakoso, Fukushima. The Otsu site featured its own hydrogen plant, while the second and third battalions used hydrogen gas transported from factories around Tokyo. The combined launching capacity of the sites was about 200 balloons per day, with 15,000 launches planned through March. The Army estimated that only 10 percent of the balloons would survive the journey across the Pacific Ocean.

Each launch pad consisted of anchor screws drilled into the ground in a circle the same diameter as the balloons. After anchoring an envelope, hoses were used to fill it with 8,100 cubic feet (230 m^{3}) of hydrogen while it was tied down with guide ropes and detached from the anchors. The carriage was attached with shroud lines, and the guide ropes were untied. Each launch required a crew of 30 men and took between 30 minutes and one hour, depending on the presence of surface winds. The best time for launches was after a high-pressure front had passed, and wind conditions were best before the onshore breezes at sunrise. Suitable wind conditions were only expected for three to five days a week, for a total of about fifty days during the winter period of maximum jet stream velocity.

The first balloons were launched on November 3, 1944. Some balloons in each of the launches carried radiosonde equipment instead of bombs, and were tracked by direction finding stations to follow their progress. Two weeks after the discovery of the B-Type balloon off San Pedro, an A-Type balloon was found in the ocean off Kailua, Hawaii, on November 14. (Note: A second B-Type balloon was found near Yerington, Nevada, on November 9, 1944, but was not reported until June 1945.) More were found near Thermopolis, Wyoming, on December 6 (with an explosion heard by witnesses, and a crater later located) and near Kalispell, Montana, on December 11, followed by finds near Marshall and Holy Cross, Alaska, and Estacada, Oregon, later in the month. Authorities were placed on heightened alert, and forest rangers were ordered to report landings and recoveries. The balloons continued to be discovered across North America, with sightings and partial or full recoveries in Alaska, Arizona, California, Colorado, Hawaii, Idaho, Iowa, Kansas, Michigan (where an incendiary bomb was found at Farmington in the easternmost incident), Montana, Nebraska, Nevada, North Dakota, Oregon, South Dakota, Texas, Utah, Washington, and Wyoming; in Canada in Alberta, British Columbia, Manitoba, Saskatchewan, and the Northwest and Yukon Territories; in Mexico in Baja California Norte and Sonora; and at sea. (Note: On March 13, 1945, two balloons returned to Japan, landing near Hakodate, Hokkaido, and in Akita Prefecture. Both fell in snow and caused no damage.) By August 1945, the U.S. Army had recorded 285 balloon incidents (28 by January, 54 in February, 114 in March, 42 in April, 16 in May, 17 in June, and 14 in July).

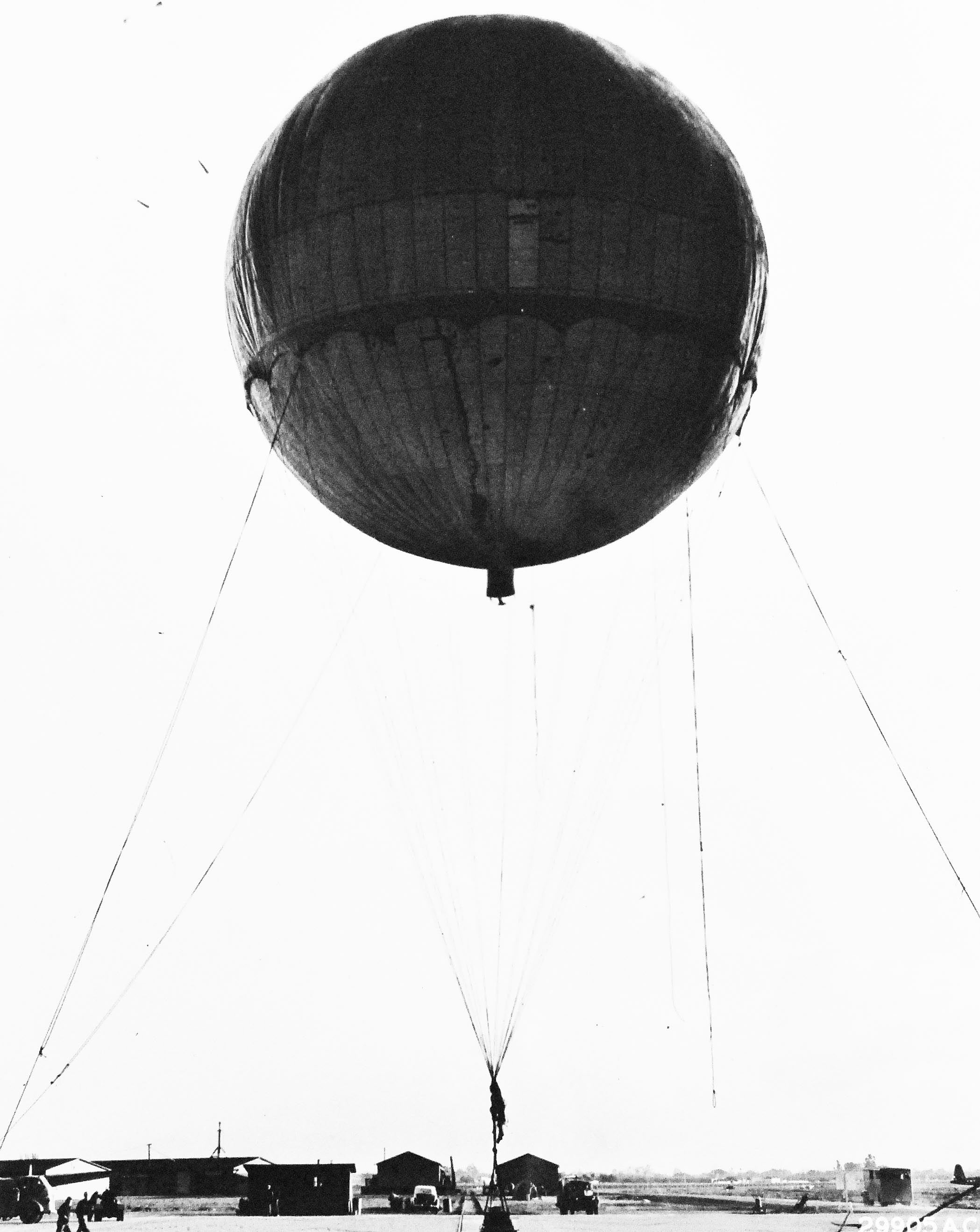
Balloon found near Alturas, California, on January 10, 1945, reinflated at Moffett Field

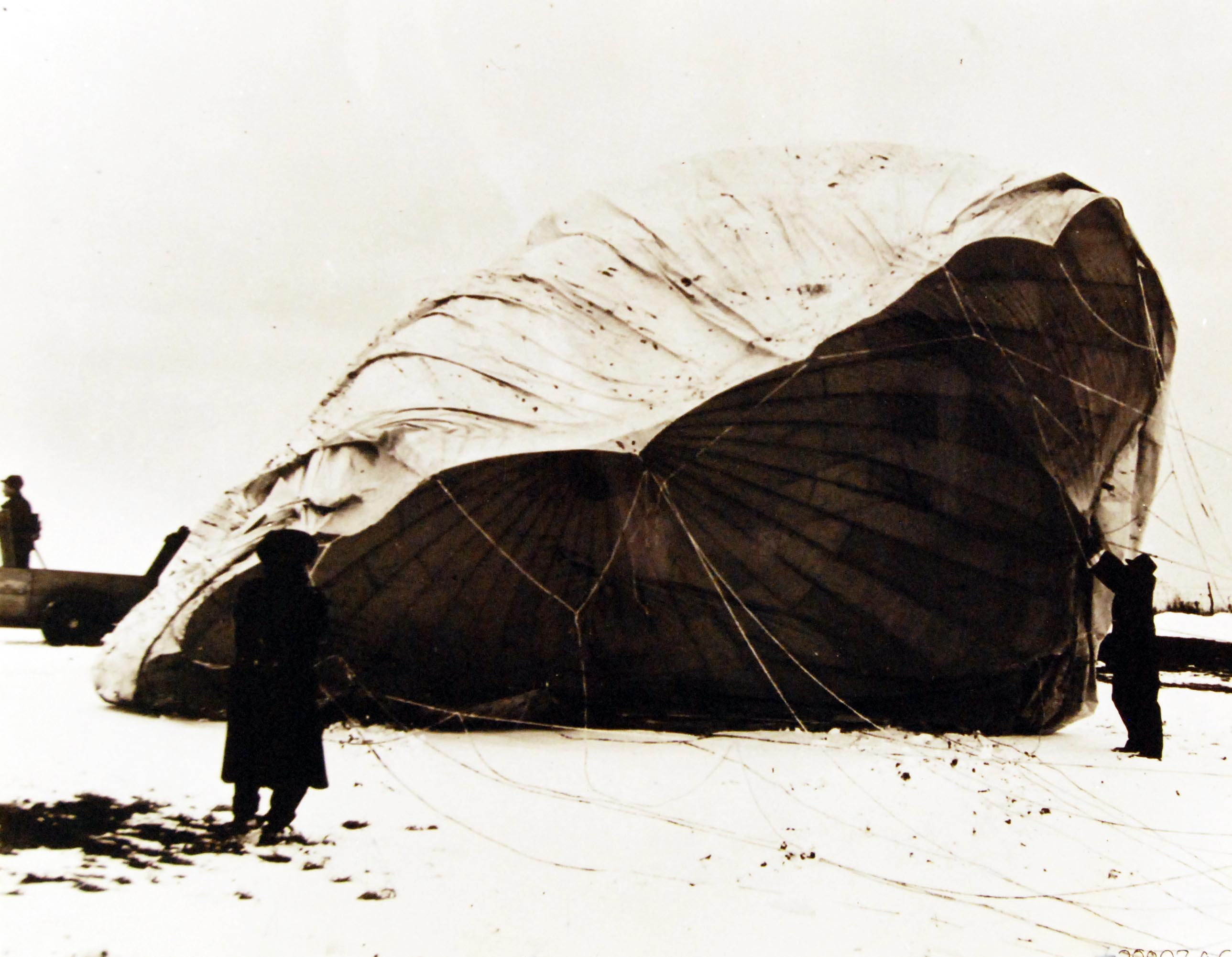
Balloon found near Bigelow, Kansas, on February 23, 1945

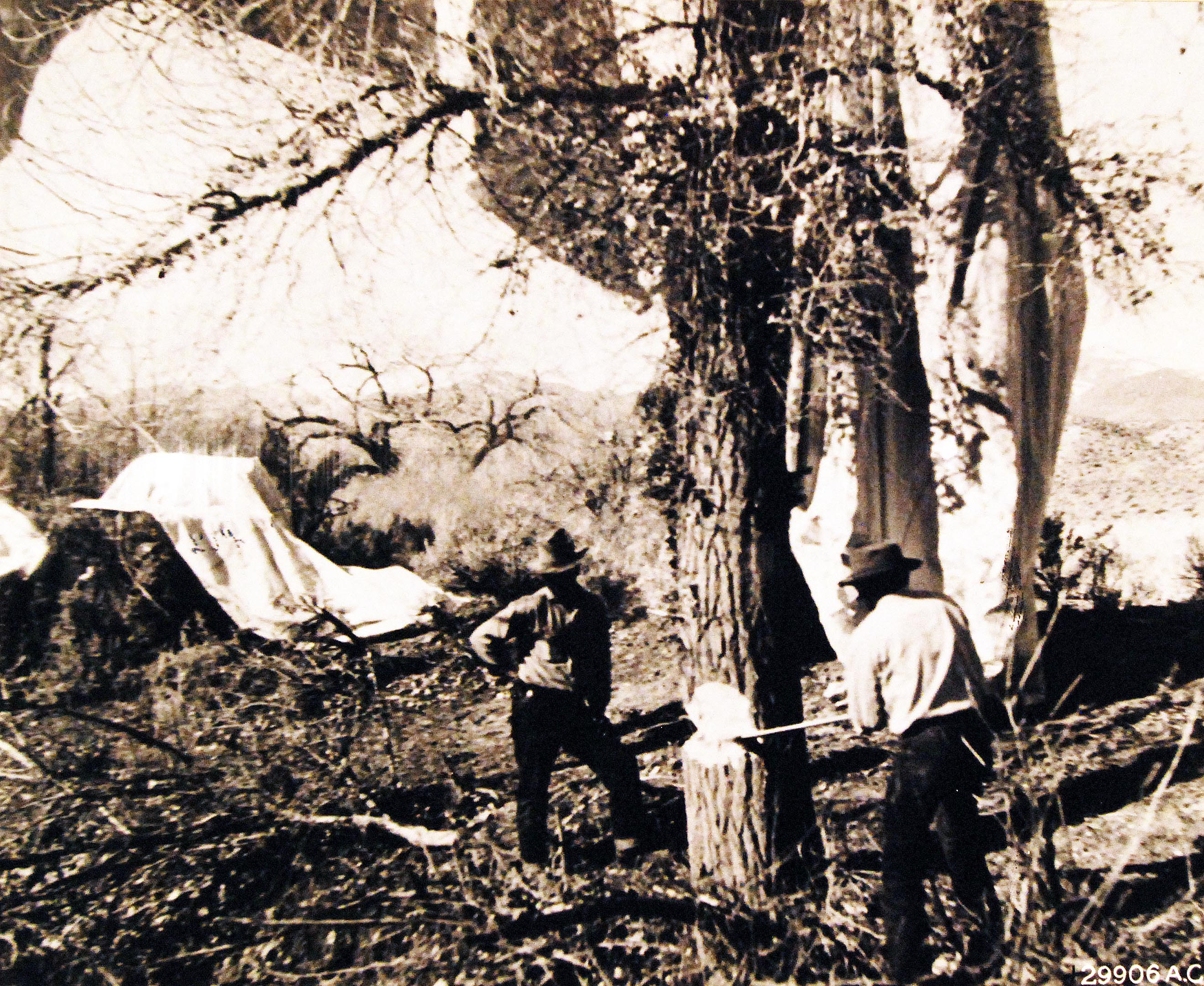
Balloon found near Nixon, Nevada, on March 29, 1945

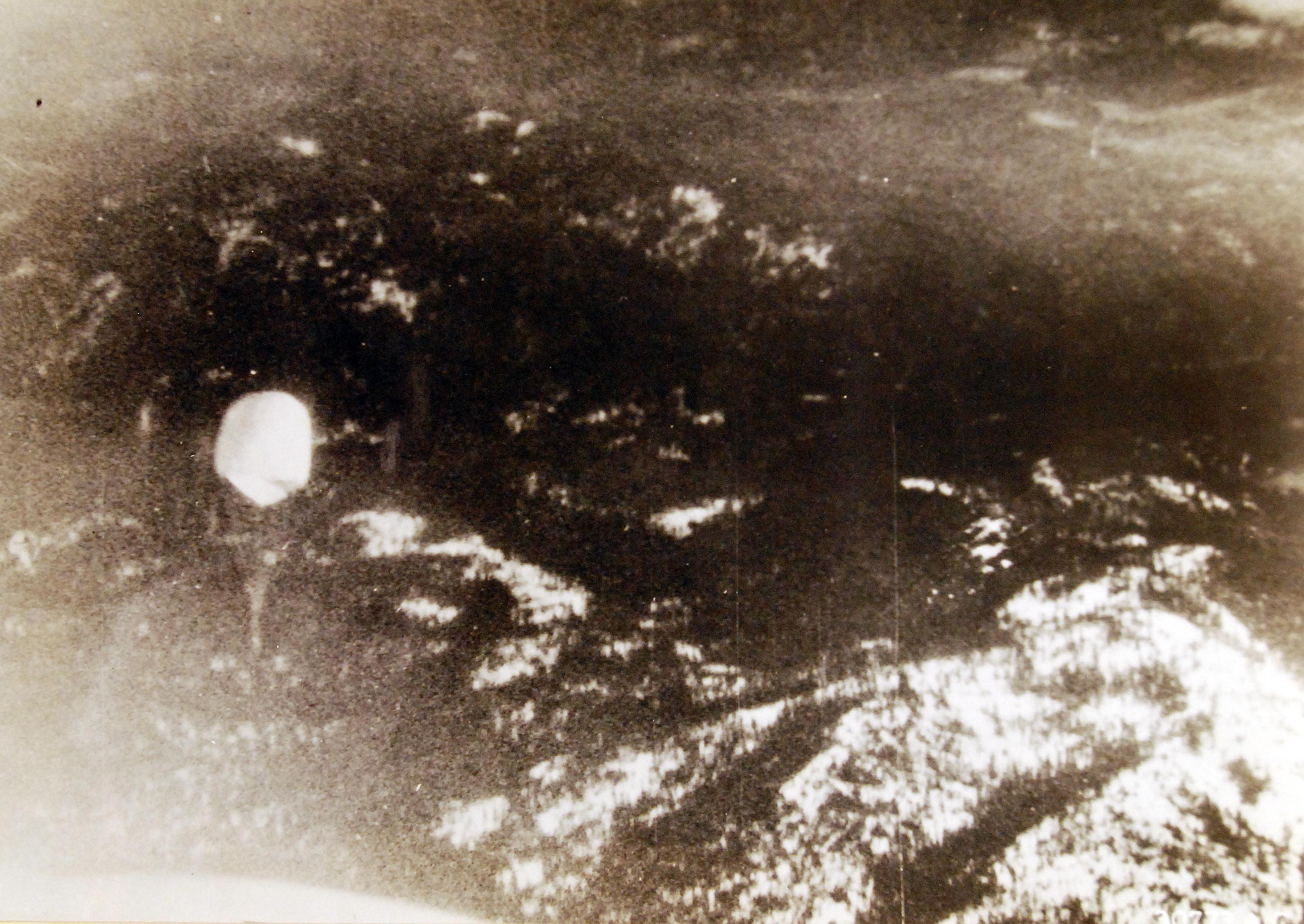
Aerial photograph of a balloon taken from an American plane

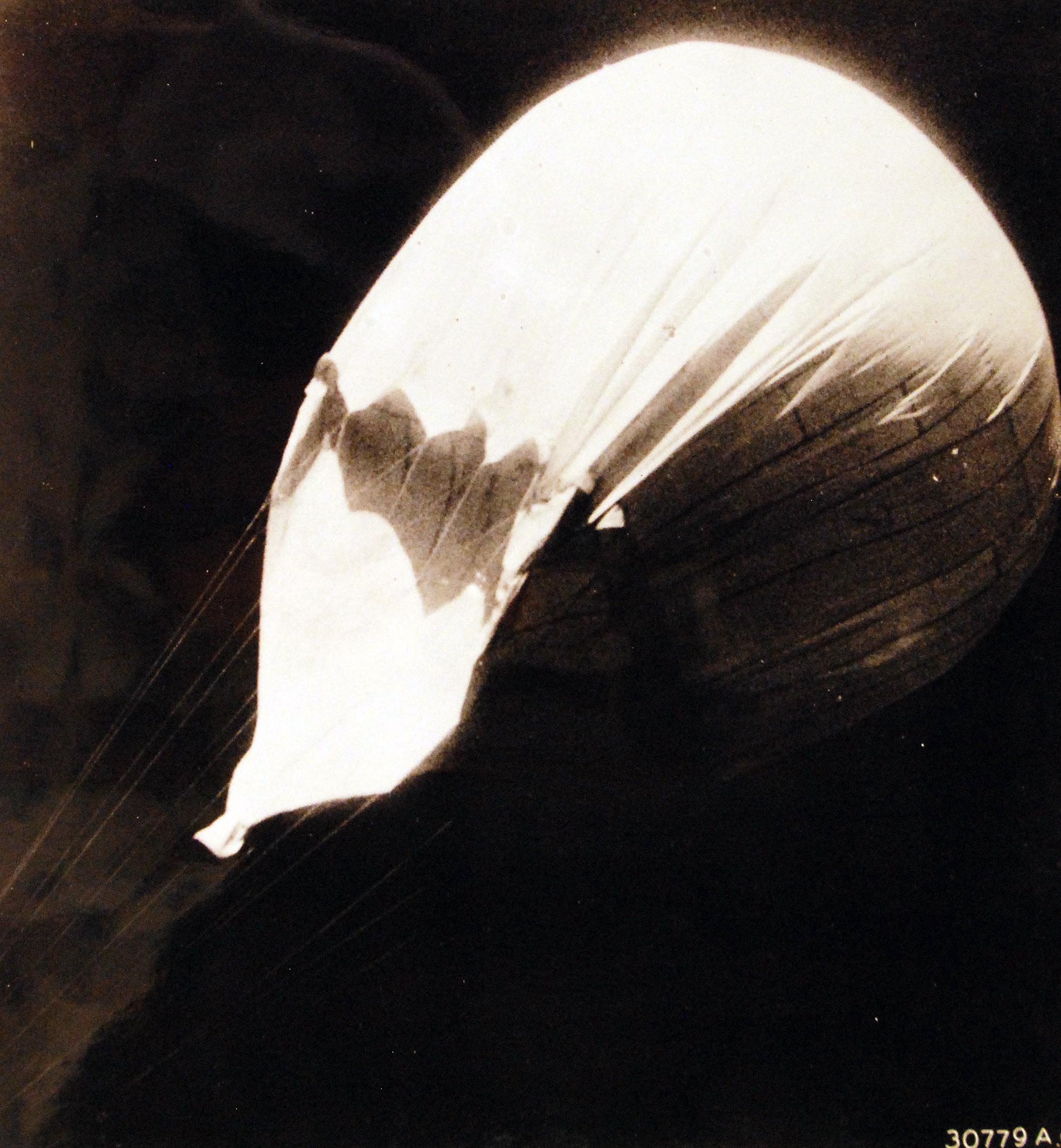
Another aerial photograph of a balloon

Most U.S. defense plans were only fully implemented after the offensive ended in April 1945. In response to the threat of wildfires in the Pacific Northwest during the summer months, the Army's Western Defense Command (WDC), Fourth Air Force, and Ninth Service Command organized the "Firefly Project" with Stinson L-5 Sentinel and Douglas C-47 Skytrain aircraft and 2,700 troops, including 200 paratroopers from the all-black 555th Parachute Infantry Battalion, who were deployed in 36 firefighting missions between May and October 1945. The Army used the U.S. Forest Service as a proxy agency, unifying fire suppression communications between federal and state agencies and modernizing the service through an influx of military personnel, equipment, and tactics. In the WDC's "Lightning Project", health and agricultural officers, veterinarians, and 4-H clubs were instructed to report any new diseases of crops or livestock caused by potential biological warfare. Stocks of decontamination chemicals, ultimately unused, were shipped to key points in the western states. Although biological warfare had been a concern for months, the WDC's plan was not formalized and fully implemented until July 1945. A sub-section of the project, "Arrow", provided for rapid air transportation of all balloon remains to the Technical Air Intelligence Center laboratory in Washington, D.C., for biological analysis. A U.S. investigation after the war concluded there had not been plans for chemical or biological payloads.

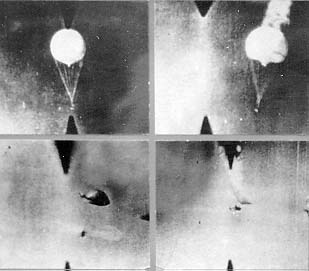
Balloon shot down by P-38 Lightning fighters at Attu, Aleutian Islands, Alaska, on April 13, 1945

Army Air Forces and Navy fighter planes were scrambled on several occasions to intercept balloons, but they had little success due to inaccurate sighting reports, bad weather, and the very high altitude at which the balloons traveled. In all, only about 20 balloons were shot down by U.S. and Canadian pilots. (Note: This figure includes 11 balloons shot down by the U.S. Air Force over the Aleutian Islands in Alaska: over Shemya on January 25, 1945; Attu on April 12; and nine more over Attu on April 13. Four balloons were shot down over the continental U.S.: over North Bend, Oregon, on February 22; Calistoga, California, on February 23; Reno, Nevada, on March 22; and Imperial Valley, California, on March 28. The Royal Canadian Air Force shot down balloons over Sumas, Washington, on February 21 and Galiano Island in British Columbia on March 10.) Attempts to track the radiosonde balloons produced 95 suspected signals, but they were of little use due to the very low proportion of balloons with transmitters, and observed fading of signals as they approached. Experiments on recovered balloons in February 1945 to determine their radar reflectivity were unsuccessful. In the "Sunset Project", initiated in early April and fully operational by June, the Fourth Air Force attempted to detect balloons with search radars at ground-controlled interception sites in coastal Washington, but the project detected nothing and was cancelled in early August.

Few American officials believed at first that the balloons could have come directly from Japan. Early U.S. theories speculated that they were launched from German prisoner of war camps or from Japanese-American internment centers. After bombs of Japanese origin were found, it was believed that the balloons were launched from coastal submarines. Statistical analysis of valve serial numbers suggested that tens of thousands of balloons had been produced. The mineral and diatom composition of sand from the sandbags was studied by the Military Geology Unit of the United States Geological Survey, which assessed its origin as Shiogama, Miyagi, or less likely, Ichinomiya, Chiba, only the latter being correct. Aerial reconnaissance of Shiogama in May 1945 showed what was mistakenly interpreted as inflated balloons and a possible launch area at the beach.

=== Censorship campaign ===
On January 4, 1945, the U.S. Office of Censorship sent a confidential memo to newspaper editors and radio broadcasters asking that they give no publicity to balloon incidents; this proved highly effective, with the agency sending another memo three months later stating that cooperation had been "excellent" and that "there is no question that your refusal to publish or broadcast information about these balloons has baffled the Japanese, annoyed and hindered them, and has been an important contribution to security." The Imperial Army only ever learned of the balloon at Kalispell from an article in the Chinese newspaper Ta Kung Pao on December 18, 1944. The Kalispell find was originally reported on December 14 by the Western News, a weekly published in Libby, Montana; the story later appeared in articles in the January 1, 1945, editions of Time and Newsweek magazines, as well as on the front page of the January 2 edition of The Oregonian of Portland, Oregon, before the Office of Censorship sent the memo. Starting in mid-February 1945, Japanese propaganda broadcasts falsely announced numerous fires and a panicked American public, further claiming casualties in the hundreds or thousands.

One breach occurred in late February, when Representative Arthur L. Miller mentioned the balloons in a weekly column he sent to all 91 newspapers in his Nebraska district, which stated in part: "As a final act of desperation, it is believed that the Japs may release fire balloons aimed at our great forests in the northwest". In response, intelligence officers at the Seventh Service Command in Omaha contacted the editors at all 91 papers, requesting censorship; this was largely successful, with only two papers printing the column. In late March, the United Press (UP) wrote a detailed article on the balloons intended for its national distributors; the Army officer who reported the breach commented that it included "a lot of mechanical detail on the thing, in addition to being a hell of a scare story". Censors contacted the UP, which replied that the article had not yet been teletyped; all five copies were retrieved and destroyed. Investigators determined the information originated from a briefing to Colorado state legislators, which had been leaked in an open session.

In late April, censors investigated the nationally-syndicated comic strip Tim Tyler's Luck by Lyman Young, which depicted a Japanese balloon recovered by the crew of a U.S. submarine. In subsequent weeks, its protagonists fought monster vines which sprang from seeds the balloon was carrying, created by an evil Japanese horticulturist. A few weeks later, the comic strip Smilin' Jack by Zack Mosley depicted a plane crashing into a Japanese balloon, which exploded and started a fire upon falling to the ground. In both cases, the Office of Censorship deemed it unnecessary to censor the Sunday comics.

== Abandonment and results ==
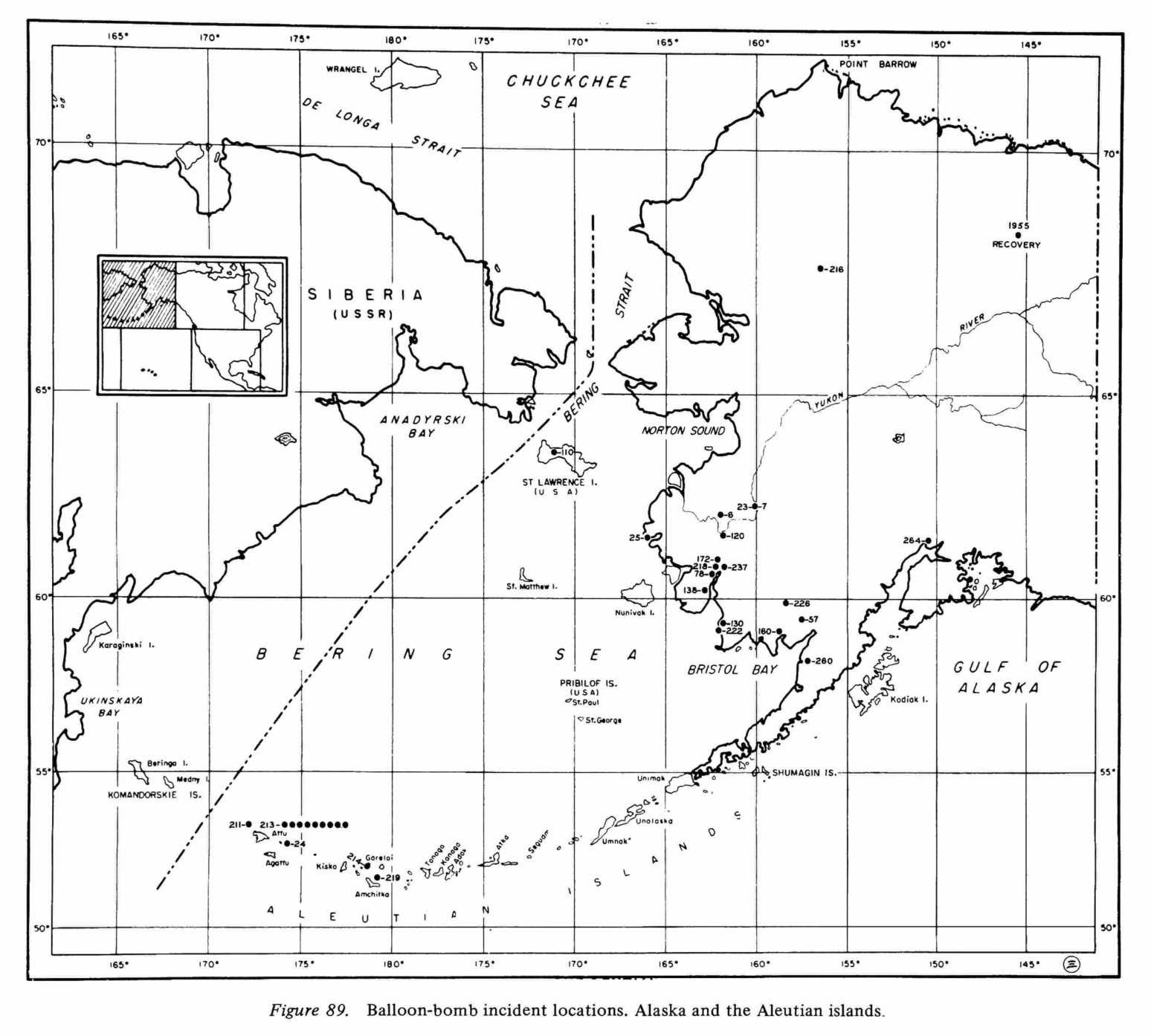
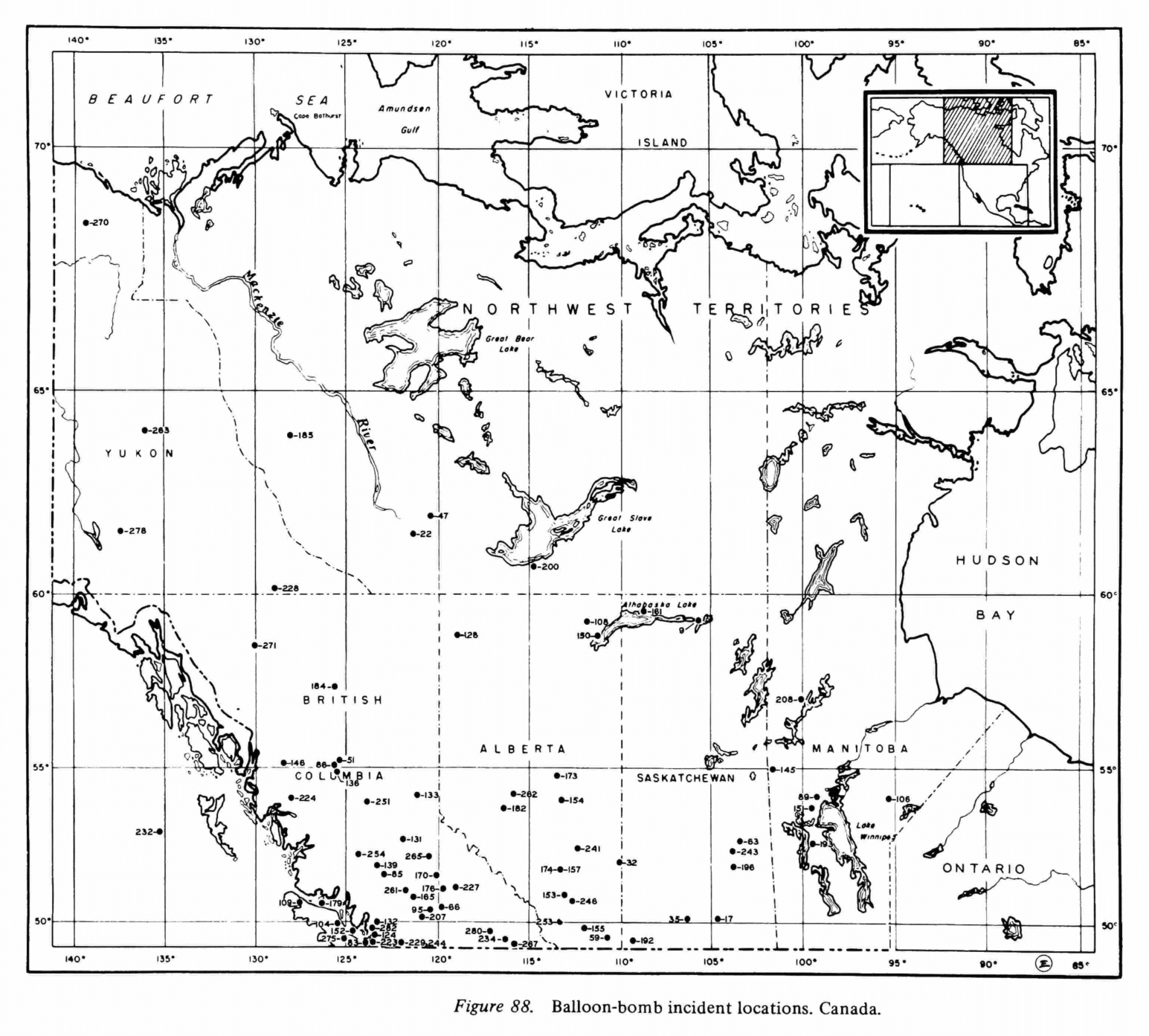
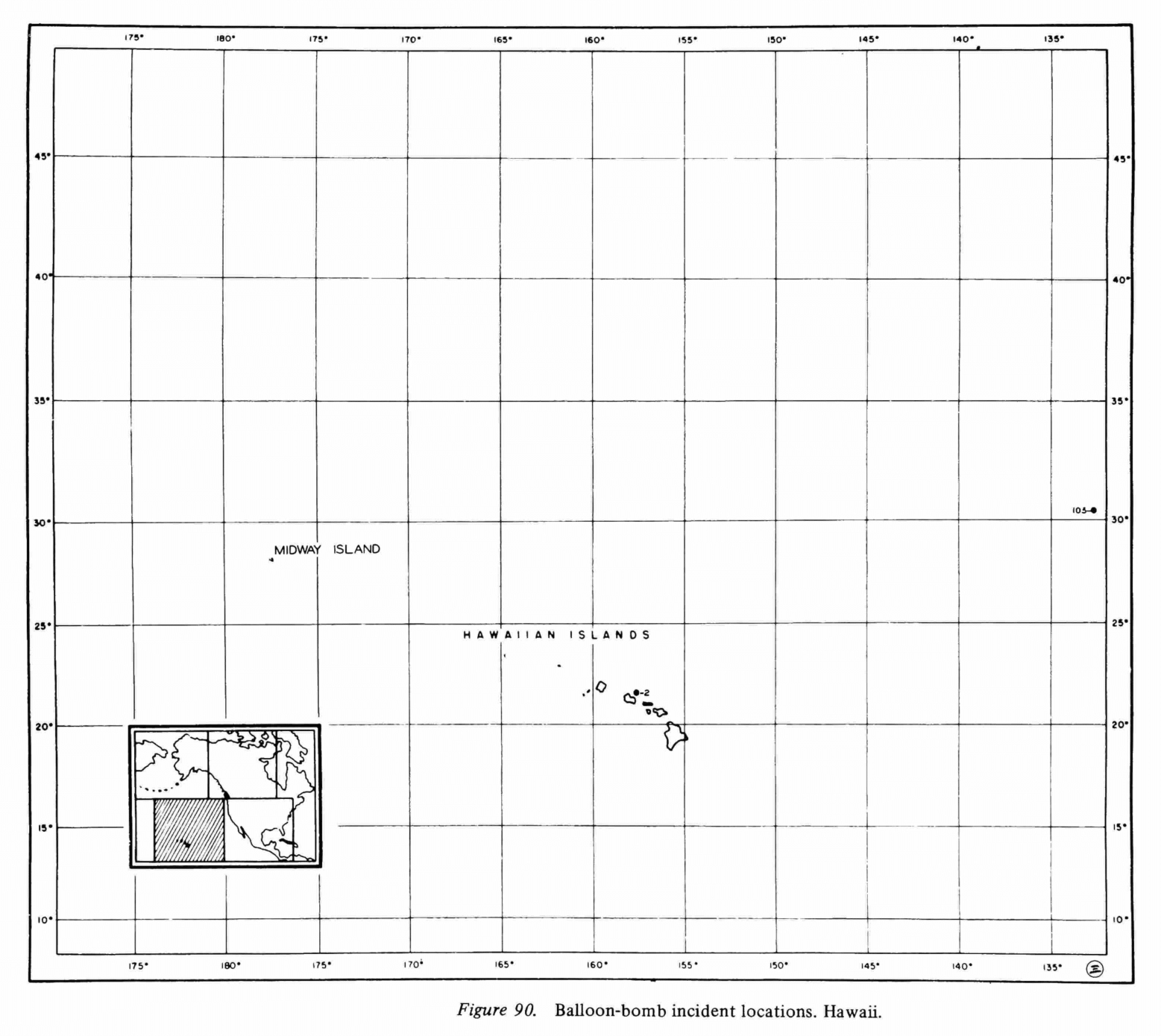
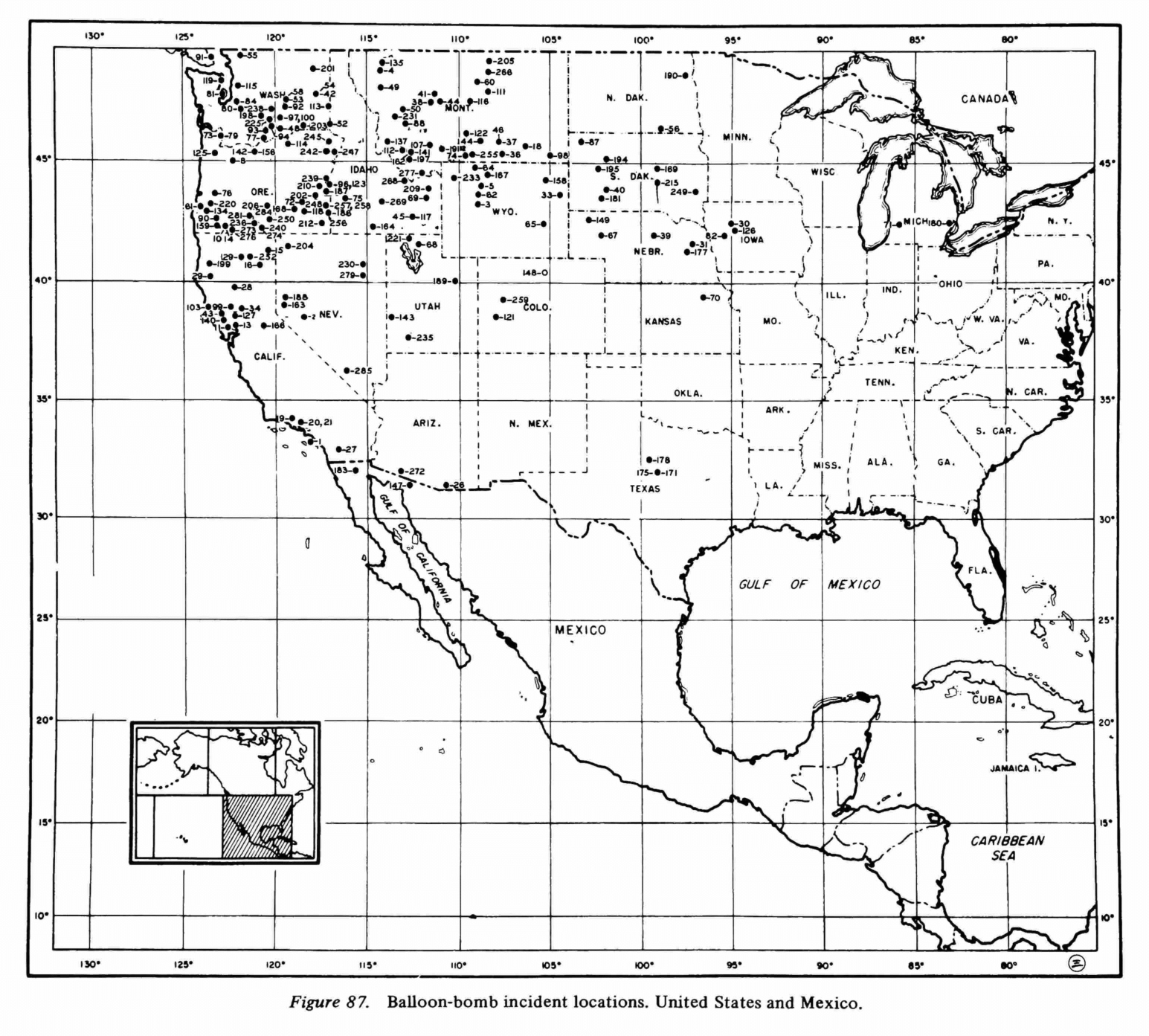
Map of Fu-Go incident locations in North America, marked with black dots

By mid-April 1945, Japan lacked the resources to continue manufacturing balloons, with both paper and hydrogen in short supply. Furthermore, the Army had little evidence that the balloons were reaching North America, let alone causing damage. The campaign was halted, with no intention to revive it when the jet stream regained strength in fall 1945. The last balloon was launched on April 20. In total, about 9,300 were launched in the campaign (about 700 in November 1944, 1,200 in December, 2,000 in January 1945, 2,500 in February, 2,500 in March, and 400 in April), of which about 300 were found or observed in North America. The Fu-Go balloon bomb is considered to be the first weapon system in history with intercontinental range, a significant development in warfare which was followed by the advent of the world's first intercontinental ballistic missile (ICBM), the Soviet Union's R-7, in 1957.

Only "one or two" small grass fires were attributed to the balloon bombs. As predicted by Imperial Army officials, the winter and spring launch dates had limited the chances of the incendiaries starting fires due to the high levels of precipitation in the Pacific Northwest; forests were generally snow-covered or too damp to catch fire easily. Furthermore, much of the western U.S. received disproportionately more precipitation in 1945 than in any other year in the decade, with some areas receiving 4 to 10 inches (10 to 25 cm) of precipitation more than other years. The most damaging attack occurred on March 10, 1945, when a balloon descended near Toppenish, Washington, and collided with electric transmission lines, causing a short circuit which cut off power to the Manhattan Project's production facility at the state's Hanford Engineer Works. Backup devices restored power to the site, but it took three days for its plutonium-producing nuclear reactors to be restored to full capacity; the plutonium was later used in Fat Man, the atomic bomb dropped on Nagasaki.

== Single lethal attack ==
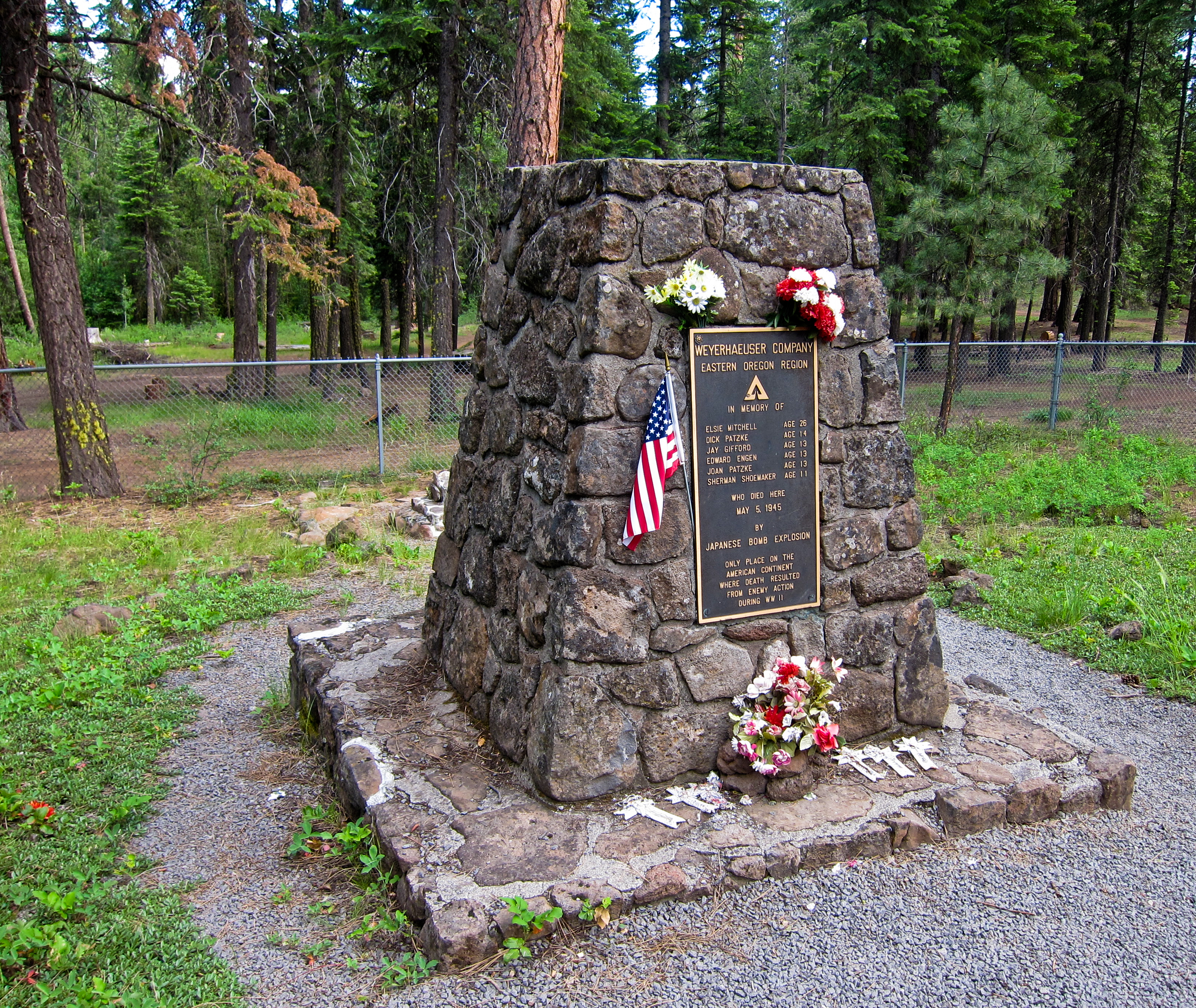
Mitchell Monument in 2011

On May 5, 1945, six civilians were killed near Bly, Oregon, when they discovered one of the balloon bombs in Fremont National Forest, becoming the only fatalities from Axis action in the continental U.S. during the war. Reverend Archie Mitchell and his pregnant wife Elsie (age 26) drove up Gearhart Mountain that day with five of their Sunday school students for a picnic. While Archie was parking the car, Elsie and the children discovered a balloon and carriage, loaded with an anti-personnel bomb, on the ground. A large explosion occurred; the four boys (Edward Engen, 13; Jay Gifford, 13; Dick Patzke, 14; and Sherman Shoemaker, 11) were killed instantly, while Elsie and Joan Patzke (13) died from their wounds shortly afterwards. An Army investigation concluded that the bomb had likely been kicked or dropped, and that it had lain undisturbed for about one month before the incident. The U.S. press blackout was lifted on May 22 so the public could be warned of the balloon threat.

A memorial, the Mitchell Monument, was built in 1950 at the site of the explosion, and the surrounding Mitchell Recreation Area was listed on the National Register of Historic Places in 2003. A ponderosa pine near the site bears scars on its trunk from the bomb's shrapnel. In 1987, a group of Japanese women involved in Fu-Go production as schoolgirls delivered 1,000 paper cranes to the victims' families as a symbol of peace and healing, and six cherry trees were planted at the site on the incident's 50th anniversary in 1995.

== After World War II ==
Small-scale model (1:5 balloon, 1:2 carriage) of a Fu-Go balloon at Edo-Tokyo Museum

All Japanese records on the Fu-Go program were destroyed in compliance with a directive issued on August 15, 1945, the day Japan announced its surrender. Thus, a single interview with Lieutenant Colonel Terato Kunitake of the Army General Staff and a Major Inouye became the source of nearly all information on the project's objectives for U.S. investigators. A five-volume report, prepared by a team led by Karl T. Compton of the Office of Scientific Research and Development and Edward L. Moreland of MIT, was later submitted to President Harry S. Truman.

The remains of balloons have continued to be discovered after the war. At least eight were found in the 1940s, three in the 1950s, two in the 1960s, and one in the 1970s. A carriage with a live bomb was found near Lumby, British Columbia, in 2014 and detonated by a Royal Canadian Navy ordnance disposal team. Remains of another balloon were found near McBride, British Columbia, in 2019. Many war museums in the U.S. and Canada hold Fu-Go fragments, including the National Air and Space Museum, Comox Air Force Museum and the Canadian War Museum.

== In popular culture ==
Fu-Go bombs were used as a major plot point in the Hawaii Five-0 reboot episode Ua ola loko i ke aloha.

The Batman character Mary Turner/Strix was disfigured and rendered mute as a child by a balloon bomb in 1945, and was later taken by the Court of Owls to be trained as a Talon assassin.

== See also ==
- E77 balloon bomb – 1950s U.S. biological weapon inspired by Fu-Go
- History of military ballooning – Includes Austrian use of balloon bombs at Venice in 1849
- Operation Outward – WWII British attack on Germany with balloon bombs
- WS-124A Flying Cloud – 1950s U.S. Air Force balloon bomb program
