= E77 balloon bomb =

American anti-crop biological munition

The E77 balloon bomb was a U.S. anti-crop biological munition based on the design of Japanese Fu-Go balloon bomb. The E77 used feathers as a vector to disseminate anti-crop agents from a hydrogen-filled balloon and was first developed in 1950.

== Background ==
In the late stages of World War II, Japan employed thousands of incendiary and antipersonnel weapons via unmanned balloon, using some 9,300 of these devices, releasing them into the high altitude jet stream to travel over the Pacific Ocean to the North American mainland. The Japanese use of these balloon munitions inspired the E77, though no direct connection was made between the two.

== History ==
Development of the E77 balloon bomb began in 1950. The design of the E77 was based on the design for the World War II Japanese bomb and approved by the Army's Chemical Corps Technical Committee in April 1951. At time of its development the E77 represented one-sixth of all U.S. biological munitions efforts. The E77 was designated a "strategic weapon" and readied for deployment but was never used in warfare as subsequent developments in munitions supplanted the E77, especially the 750-pound E86 cluster bomb.

== Specifications ==
Similar to the Japanese fire balloon on which its design is based, the E77 utilized a hydrogen-filled balloon. Suspended from the balloon envelope was a 32 inch by 24 inch balloon gondola. The E77 was an anti-crop munition, designed to disseminate anti-crop agents, such as wheat stem rust. The balloon bomb employed a dissemination method similar to that of the M115 anti-crop bomb, or "feather bomb". This dissemination method combined a culture of anti-crop agent with a light-weight vector, in this case, feathers.

== Tests involving the E77 ==
At least three separate sets of tests were conducted with the E77 balloon bomb. From October to December 1954 41 E77s were launched at Vernalis, California, which demonstrated that the munition met "military characteristics" to create high levels of plant infection on targeted crops. Further testing in 1958 showed that when cereal rust spores were delivered via an oil-based vector (wet spores) that they remained viable for longer periods in less than ideal environmental conditions. Subsequent investigations at Fort Detrick and the University of Minnesota came to several positive conclusions about the effectiveness of oils as carriers of the rust spores.

== See also ==
- History of military ballooning
- Mitchell Recreation Area
- Union Army Balloon Corps
