= Archie E. Mitchell =

American evangelical and missionary (born 1918)

Archie Emerson Mitchell
- Born: May 1, 1918; Franklin, Nebraska, U.S.
- Disappeared: May 30, 1962 (aged 44); Vietnam
- Occupations: Minister, Missionary
- Employer(s): Christian and Missionary Alliance (C&MA)
- Spouse(s): Elsie Winters Mitchell (m.1943–1945); Betty Patzke Mitchell (m.1947–1962)
- Children: 4

The Reverend Archie Emerson Mitchell (born May 1, 1918 – disappeared May 30, 1962) was an American minister with the Christian and Missionary Alliance (C&MA). Mitchell Recreation Area was built after his pregnant wife and five Sunday school children died from Fu-Go balloon bombs in the only war-related deaths in the American continent in World War II. Mitchell served as a missionary to South Vietnam working on the staff of the Ban Me Thuot Leprosarium when he was taken captive by the Vietcong on May 30, 1962, along with Daniel Amstutz Gerber and Eleanor Ardel Vietti. None of the three have been seen since.

== Early life ==
Mitchell was born in Franklin, Nebraska on May 1, 1918, to Glen Mitchell and his wife Daisy née Chaplin. The family moved to Ellensburg, Washington in 1939. He attended Simpson Bible College in Seattle, then Nyack Missionary College. It was at Simpson Bible College where he met his future wife, Elsie Winters. They were married in her home town of Port Angeles in 1943, and in 1945, he began his missionary work and they moved to Oregon.

== Balloon bomb deaths ==
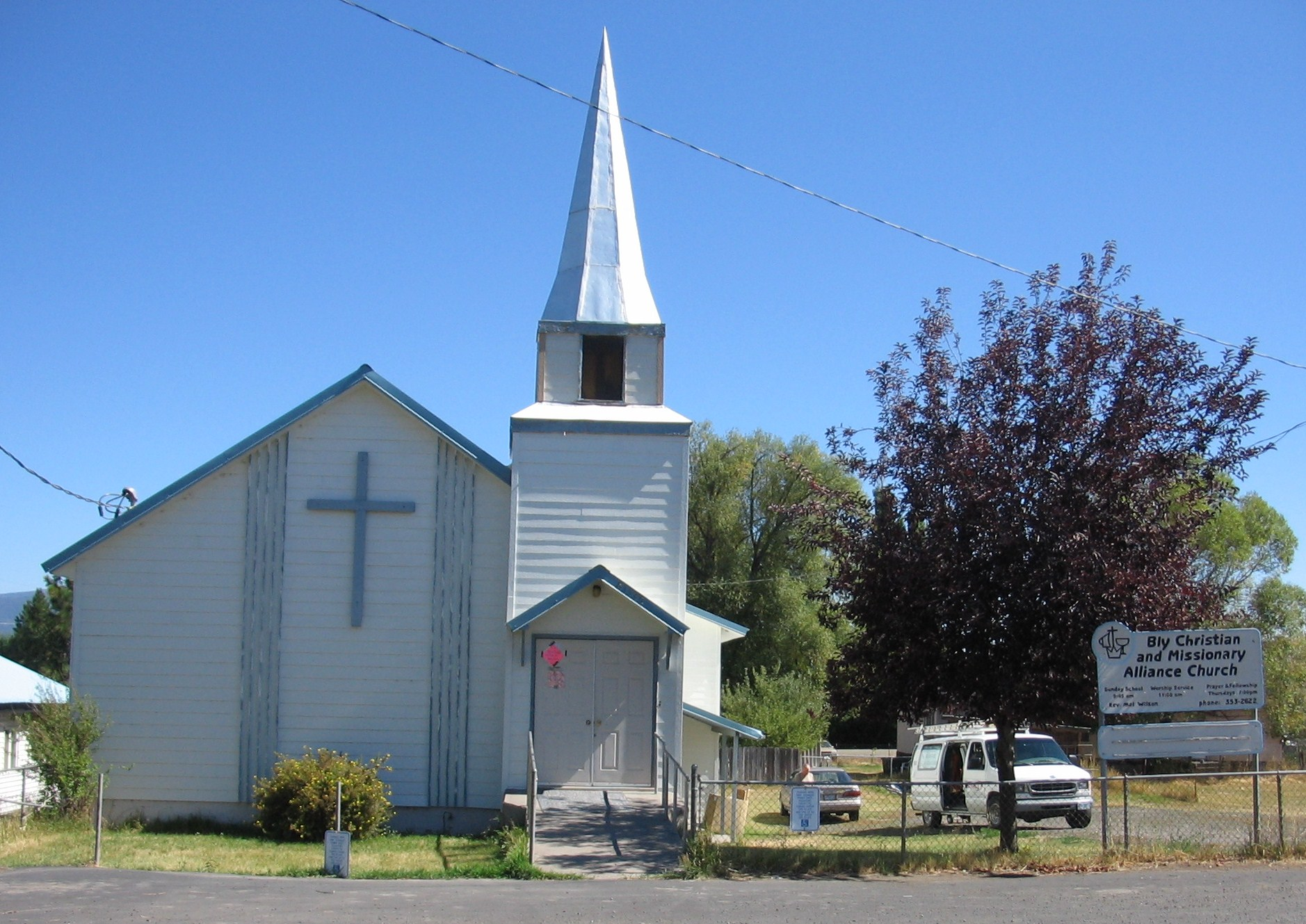
The C&MA church in Bly, Oregon.

On May 5, 1945, Mitchell, who at that time was the pastor of the C&MA church (now called "Standing Stone Church of the Christian and Missionary Alliance") in Bly, Oregon, led a Sunday School picnic up into the nearby mountains of southern Oregon. Accompanying Mitchell was his five-months-pregnant wife, Elsie (née Winters), and five children from the church. Up in the mountains, Mitchell drove the car around by the road, while the others hiked through the woods. While Mitchell was getting the lunch out of the car near Leonard Creek, the others called to him and said that they had found what looked to be a balloon. Unbeknownst to the group, this was a dangerous Japanese Fu-Go balloon bomb. As Mitchell was warning them not to touch it, there was a large explosion. Mitchell ran to the spot and found the whole group dead.

As I got out of my car to bring the lunch, the others were not far away and called to me they had found something that looked like a balloon. I had heard of Japanese balloons so I shouted a warning not to touch it. But just then there was a big explosion. I ran up there — and they were all dead.

— Archie Mitchell, 1945 interview

Killed in the explosion were Elsie Mitchell, 26, and the five children: Sherman Shoemaker, 11, Jay Gifford, 13, Edward Engen, 13, Joan Patzke, 13, and Dick Patzke, 14. They were the first and only American civilians to be killed by enemy action in the continental United States during World War II.

In 1950, the Weyerhaeuser timber company built a monument at the site of the explosion. The Mitchell Monument is constructed of native stone and displays a bronze plaque with the names and ages of the victims of the balloon bomb explosion. Weyerhaeuser donated the monument along with the surrounding land to the Fremont National Forest in 1998. The monument site is listed on the National Register of Historic Places.

== Indo-China mission ==
On December 23, 1947, Mitchell with his new bride Betty (née Patzke, the older sister of two of the children killed by the fire balloon in Bly) sailed to Indo-China for what was the beginning of two five-year terms of service as missionaries to the Vietnamese people of Da Lat. After a two-year furlough, the Mitchells' third term of service would be their assignment at the Ban Me Thuot Leprosarium.

On the evening of May 30, 1962, Mitchell and the rest of the staff of the leprosarium were preparing to meet at Vietti's house for their weekly prayer meeting. At dusk, around 7:45 p.m., a group of 12 members of the Viet Cong entered the leprosarium grounds, which was located about nine miles from Ban Me Thuot. The Viet Cong split up into three groups of four members each, and one group met Dan Gerber, who served with the Mennonite Central Committee, and tied him up. A second group went to the Mitchell home, ordered Archie out of the house, tied him up, and led him away with Dan Gerber. This was witnessed by the members of the Mitchell family including his wife, Betty, and three of their four children, Rebecca (age 13), Loretta (age 10), and Glenn (age 8). The youngest Mitchell child, daughter Geraldine (age 4), was already asleep in bed. Another group of Viet Cong went to Vietti's house and found her in bed. She was ordered to get up, dress, and she was led out of the compound, unbound, to join the other two captives. The Viet Cong planned to take Betty and the children captive as well, but were convinced by the missionaries that they would only fully cooperate if Betty and the children were left behind. The Viet Cong also ransacked the buildings for any supplies they could use, including linens, medicines, clothing, and surgical equipment. At around 10:00 p.m. that evening the Viet Cong left the compound taking the prisoners (Mitchell, Gerber, and Vietti) and supplies with them. This all happened without any shots fired or any bloodshed.

After their capture both American and South Vietnamese military intelligence agencies immediately discovered where the captives were probably being detained, and also confirmed that the Viet Cong used the missionaries' medical expertise to treat their own sick and wounded. While military intelligence was able to successfully track the movements of Mitchell, Gerber, and Vietti, the heavy and continuous Viet Cong presence in and around the area they were being held captive did not allow the military to mount a rescue mission. Missionary officials also attempted to negotiate for release of the captives. Although, by 1969, negotiations between the C&MA and some Viet Cong soldiers appeared close to securing their release, the negotiations collapsed and never could be reconstituted.

== See also ==
- List of people who disappeared
