= Incendiary balloon =

Unmanned balloons launched in the hope of starting fires in enemy countries

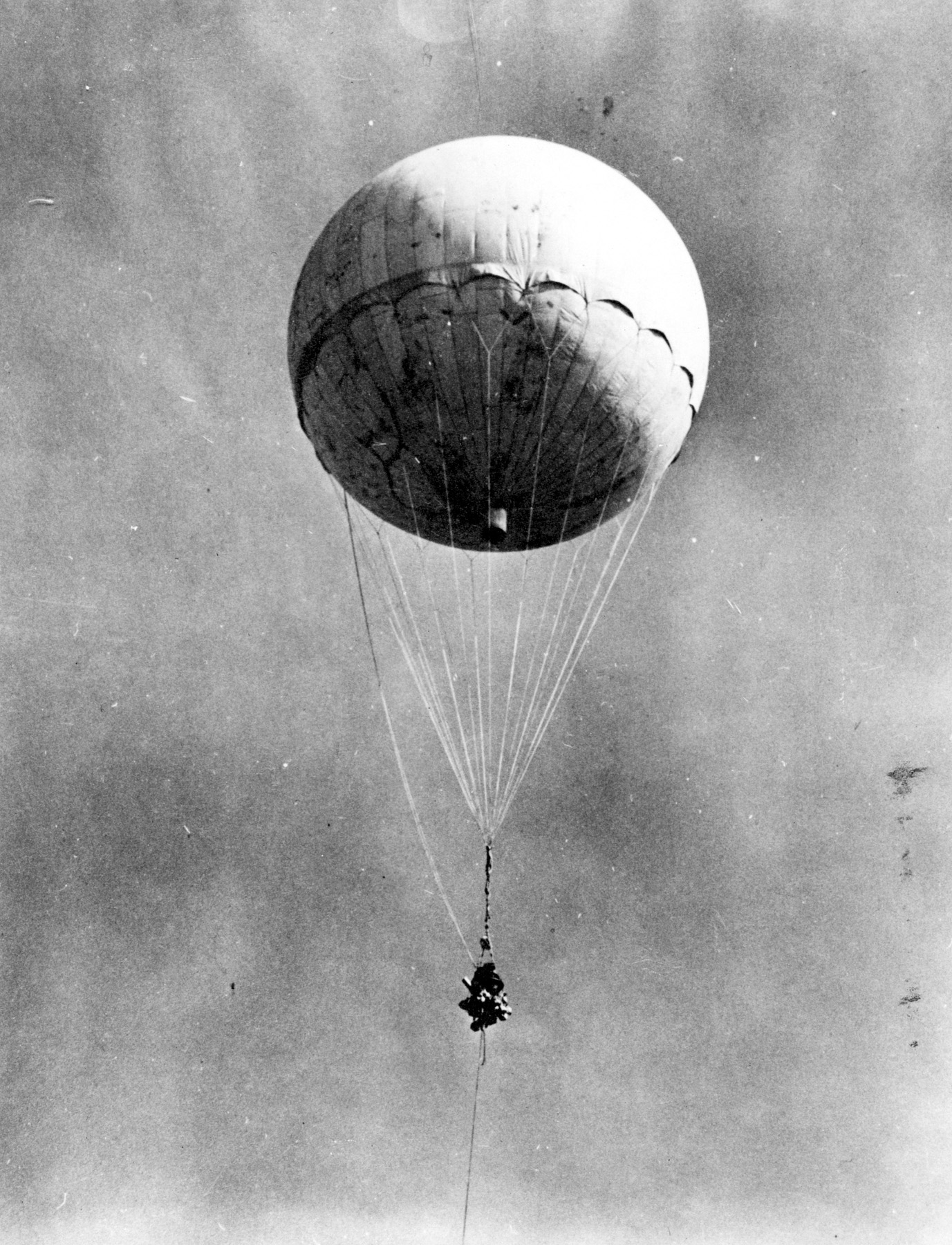
Japanese Fu-Go balloon bombs were deployed during World War II

An incendiary balloon (or balloon bomb) is a balloon inflated with a lighter-than-air gas such as hot air, hydrogen, or helium, that has a bomb, incendiary device, or Molotov cocktail attached. The balloon is carried by the prevailing winds to the target area, where it falls or releases its payload.

== Historical use ==
=== Early proposals ===
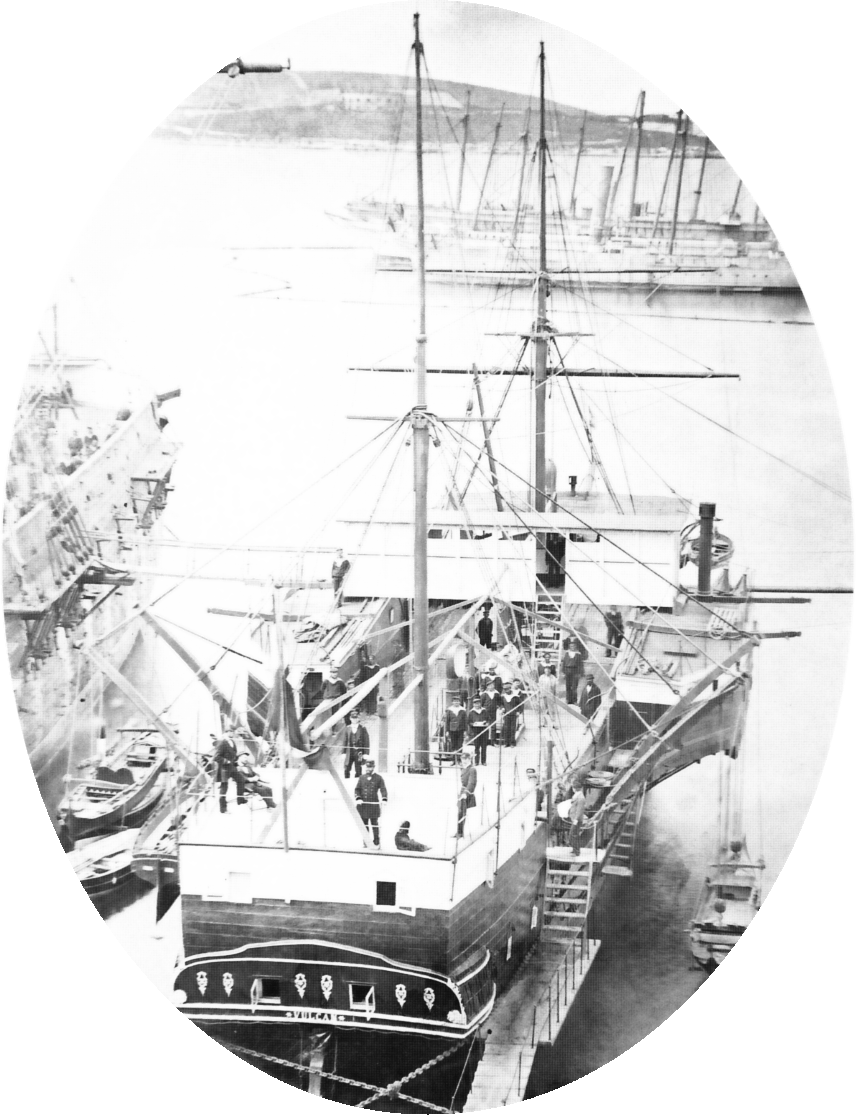
SMS Vulcano at Pula in 1879, this ship, acting as a balloon carrier, launched the first naval aviation attack in 1849 against Venice

In 1792, Joseph-Michel Montgolfier suggested using balloons for bombing British forces in Toulon. In 1807, Denmark tried to build a dirigible to bomb British ships blockading Copenhagen. In 1846 a British board rejected as impractical a bombing design by Samuel Alfred Warner. Attempts by Henry Tracey Coxwell to interest the British government a few years later were rejected as well.

In 1847, John Wise proposed the use of balloon bombs in the Mexican–American War.

=== Austrian use at Venice in 1849 ===
The first aggressive use of balloons in warfare occurred in 1849 during the First Italian War of Independence. Austrian imperial forces, who were besieging Venice, attempted to deploy approximately 200 paper hot air balloons. Each balloon was equipped with a 24-to-30-pound (11 to 14 kg) bomb, designed to be dropped over the besieged city via a time fuse. The majority of the balloons were launched from land, but some were also dispatched from the side-wheel steamer SMS Vulcano, which served as a balloon carrier. To determine the correct fuse settings, the Austrians utilized smaller pilot balloons. At least one bomb landed in the city. However, due to changes in wind direction after launch, most of the balloons missed their target. Some even drifted back over Austrian lines and the launching ship, Vulcano.

=== World War II ===
==== Operation Outward ====
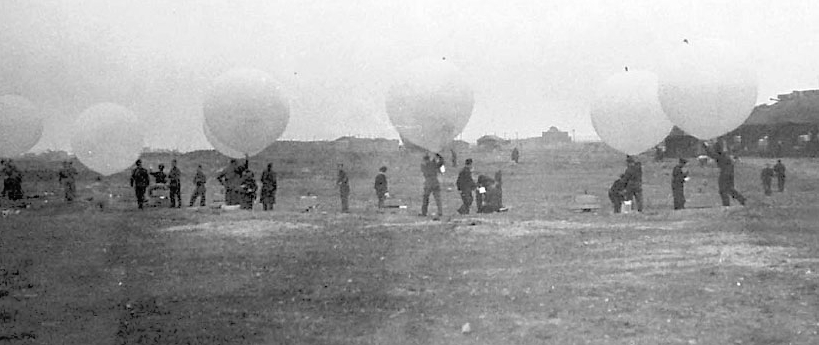
Balloon launch for Operation Outward. Felixstowe, Suffolk, England

During World War II, the British Operation Outward launched some 99,142 balloons at Germany, 53,543 of which were carrying incendiaries, the other 45,599 carrying trailing wires to damage high voltage lines.

==== Fu-Go ====
During the period of 1944-1945, in the midst of World War II, Japan initiated the launch of approximately 9,300 Fu-Go balloon bombs targeted at North America. These balloons, with a diameter of 10 meters (33 feet), were filled with hydrogen and typically transported one bomb weighing 15 kilograms (33 lbs) or alternatively, one 12-kilogram (26 lbs) bomb along with four additional bombs each weighing 5 kilograms (11 lbs). The Fu-Go balloons utilized the power of the winter jet stream, which travels at a speed of 220 miles per hour (350 km/h), to traverse a distance of 5,000 miles (8,000 km) across the Pacific Ocean in roughly three days. To maintain a specific altitude, the balloons were equipped with a barometric sensor that would jettison ballast sandbags whenever the balloon descended below 30,000 feet (9,100 m). If the sensor detected an altitude exceeding 38,000 feet (12,000 m), hydrogen would be released from the balloon. This entire mechanism was set into motion 52 minutes post-launch, allowing the balloon to attain its initial altitude. The final sandbag stations were equipped with incendiary bombs, which were dispensed by the same mechanism. Following the final release, the balloon triggered a self-destruction process and dropped an additional bomb.

The balloons were launched in the winter to take advantage of the more favorable winter jet stream. However this limited their damage potential as wildfires were less likely to catch in winter. The Fu-Go balloons inflicted relatively little damage, except for one fatal incident in which a woman and five children were killed near Bly, Oregon after they approached a balloon that had landed at the subsequently named Mitchell Recreation Area. The deaths of six civilians were the only fatalities caused by fire balloons on American soil during World War II.

=== Cold War ===
==== United States ====
Following World War II, the United States developed the E77 balloon bomb based on the Fu-Go balloon. This balloon was intended to disperse an anti-crop agent, but it was not used operationally. The 1954–1955 WS-124A Flying Cloud program tested high-altitude balloons for the delivery of weapons of mass destruction, but they were found infeasible because of their inaccuracy.

== 21st century use ==
=== Gaza Strip ===
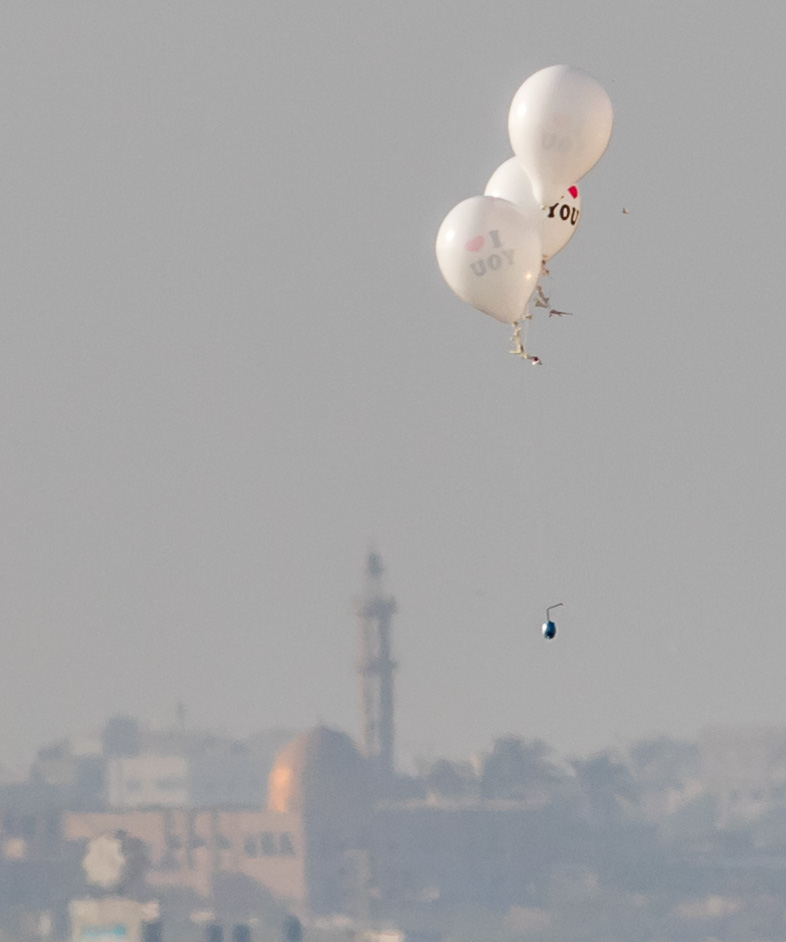
Helium party balloons bearing flammable materials launched from Bureij, Gaza Strip

Since the beginning of the 2018 Gaza border protests, Palestinian militants have been launching incendiary kites at Israel as a form of agro-terrorism. Since the beginning of May 2018, helium-filled incendiary balloons have been used alongside the kites. Gazan balloons are devised from helium-filled party balloons or condoms that are strung together, with flaming rags, other incendiary devices, or explosives strung below. The prevailing wind blowing in from the Mediterranean Sea, propels the balloons inland from Gaza into Israel.

By July 2018, incendiary kites and balloons had started 678 fires in Israel, burning 910 hectares (2,260 acres) of woodland, and 610 hectares (1,500 acres) of agricultural lands. Some balloons landed in residential areas of the Eshkol Regional Council and the Sdot Negev Regional Council. One balloon cluster reached Beersheba, some 40 kilometers (25 mi) from the Gaza strip. In response to these incendiary attacks, Israel closed the Kerem Shalom border crossing in July 2018, but later reopened it after a few months of relative calm. By the end of 2018, over 7,000 acres of land had been burned as a result of incendiary balloon attack, causing millions of shekels in damages, according to Israeli officials. The fires destroyed forests and agricultural lands, and killed livestock. The Israel Defense Forces (IDF) attempted to combat these incendiary devices by deploying small, remote-controlled drones with knives on their wings to cut the guide lines of the kites. The method ultimately proved ineffective.

Persistent incidents of airborne arson were observed in the years 2019, 2020, and 2021. In August 2020, fuel deliveries to the Gaza Strip were halted once more due to a resurgence of these arson attacks, leading to the closure of the Gaza Strip's sole power station. The most effective strategy against these balloons was found to be continuous surveillance and manual extinguishing of the fires. In February 2020, a new laser weapon system known as the Light Blade (or Lahav) was tested operationally along the Gaza border to combat kites and balloons.

On 25 August 2026 during the Gaza war, Israel warned Hamas that it will increase strikes on Gaza following concern over launches of kites, drones and balloons from the territory.as several kites were found in an Israeli community near the border with Gaza over the weekend, local media reported, threatening that "A balloon is treated like a kite, and a kite is treated like a drone, with or without explosives."

== See also ==
- Sky lantern
- Bat bomb
