= WS-124A Flying Cloud =

U.S. Air Force balloon bomb program

General information
- Type: Bomb balloon
- National origin: United States
- Primary user: United States Air Force
- Number built: 41

History
- First flight: 8 October 1954
- Developed from: Project Moby Dick

Weapon System 124A, given the codename Flying Cloud, was a project of the United States Air Force to use high-altitude balloons to deliver bombs and weapons of mass destruction on enemy targets. Tested in late 1954, the project was found to be unfeasible from the standpoint of accuracy, and the project was terminated the following year.

== Design and development ==
Alongside the WS-119L program to develop long-distance, high-altitude balloons for aerial reconnaissance, the United States Air Force initiated WS-124A in early 1953 to develop a method of delivering weaponry to targets in the Soviet Union using hydrogen balloons; such a capability was considered potentially valuable in the event of a limited nuclear conflict, or in a "broken-back" scenario following a massive nuclear exchange.

The WS-124A balloons were intended to fly at altitudes of roughly 38,600 feet (11,800 m), within the jet stream; as weather forecasts were considered to be sufficiently accurate to forecast approximately three days of wind patterns, the design flight duration was for 60 hours, in which they were expected to cover a distance of 1,500 nautical miles (1,700 mi; 2,800 km). The WS-124A balloon was designed to be capable of launching in wind speeds of up to 30 knots (35 mph; 56 km/h).

It was accepted that there would be an inherent inaccuracy in the concept; the expected target area was 360 nautical miles (410 mi; 670 km) by 480 nautical miles (550 mi; 890 km), which was considered acceptable as the designed payloads involved chemical and biological weaponry, although incendiary bombs, for starting forest fires, were also considered as a payload. It was believed that releasing chemical or biological agents from the balloons could contaminate an area "comparable in size to that affected by a low-yield nuclear weapon". Some sources claim that dirty bombs were also considered for carriage by WS-124A. In addition, the ability of the balloons to spread propaganda leaflets across enemy territory was considered useful.

== Operational history ==
Flight tests of the WS-124A balloon system started on 8 October 1954; by 13 December, 41 balloons had been launched, 25 of which were fully operational test flights. Even allowing for the expected inaccuracy, however, only six of the balloons reached their intended target area, while five more were considered to be close enough. This was not considered an acceptable level of accuracy, and in August 1955 the WS-124A program was cancelled, the conclusion being that the weather forecasts were simply not accurate enough for the system to be operationally feasible. In addition, the advent of thermonuclear weapons had made the "broken-back war" scenario WS-124A was intended for appear an impossibility.

== See also ==
- Fire balloon
- Bat bomb
