= Cuban Missile Crisis: The Aftermath =

2005 video game

- Developer: G5 Software
- Publishers: RUS: 1C Company; NA: Strategy First
- Designers: Vlad Suglobov; Sergey Sizov; Alexander Valencia-Kampo; Sergey Khalkhin; Vsevolod Martynenko
- Engine: Enigma engine
- Platform: Windows
- Release: RUS: February 4, 2005; NA: December 22, 2005
- Genre: Real-time tactics
- Modes: Single-player, multiplayer

Cuban Missile Crisis: The Aftermath, also known as The Day After: Fight for Promised Land and known in Russia as Caribbean Crisis (Russian: Карибский кризис), is a real-time tactics computer game developed by Russian developer G5 Software and published by 1C Company in Russia, Black Bean Games in Europe and Strategy First in North America. It was made using Nival Interactive's Enigma engine and is similar to Blitzkrieg.

== Plot ==
The premise of the game is based on a potential outcome of the Cuban Missile Crisis, where on October 27th, 1962 a USAF U-2 spy plane is shot down over Cuba. The action precedes armed conflict between the United States and the Soviet Union, which in turn leads to a nuclear exchange, causing millions of casualties across the globe. After the exchange, the war is continued by the USSR, the Anglo-American Alliance, China and the European Alliance. Each faction, as played out in their campaigns are attempting to avoid the imminent nuclear winter, and scramble towards Africa, South America, Asia and the Pacific.

== Campaigns ==
Anglo-American Alliance: This consists of the surviving elements of the United States and the United Kingdom. Retreating from the wasteland of Europe, the alliance invades Yugoslavia and Burma to capture vital resources, then invades Spain to funnel the resources through Gibraltar, now occupied by the Europeans. By the end of the war the Anglo-American alliance settles in South America, Southern Africa and Australia. Numerically inferior to the USSR and China, the alliance boasts the strongest navy in the game, referenced by their dynamic global campaign.

European Alliance: Headed primarily by France and a reunited Germany, this campaign revolves around slowing the Soviet invasion of Europe, assisting Sweden and the other Nordic countries as well as Italy, before relocating to the Iberian Peninsula to assist the evacuation of civilians to West Africa, where the Europeans eventually settle, but with the least amount of territory at the end of the game.

USSR: Boasting enormous manpower and resources, the Soviets are arguably one of the strongest factions in game. Beginning in Eastern Europe, the Soviets crush straggling European forces in Soviet territory, most of which is marred by the nuclear exchange. Pushing to Belgium and France, the Soviets complete the invasion of Europe, defeating the European Alliance there as well as the Anglo-Americans in Yugoslavia. A surprise attack by China in Siberia is subsequently dealt with. In order to relocate to friendly Egypt, the Soviets engage Arab-Israeli forces to open up a corridor. The Soviets settle in Eastern Africa and the Middle East.

China: Arguably the weakest faction in-game, the Chinese initially side with the Soviet Union and conduct air strikes on US bases in the Philippines. The US retaliates by destroying Beijing with nuclear weapons, killing many members of the Politburo, including Mao himself. A revolution occurs against Mao's loyalists, with the player commanding revolutionary troops against them. The revolutionaries succeed, and proceed to invade Siberia to acquire resources as well as Vietnam and Southern China, defeating both the Anglo-Americans and Europeans there. China settles eventually in Indochina and Indonesia, as well as the islands in the Pacific Ocean.

== Gameplay ==
As with Blitzkrieg, battles take place on a 3D rendered terrain with an isometric viewpoint. Battles feature different seasons, climate zones, and weather conditions, all of which can affect game play.

Players can build and repair bridges, dig trenches and pits, lay mines, resupply and repair units as well as call in air support when needed. Buildings, bridges and other objects can be destroyed. Trees and forests can be flattened by tanks or artillery fire, and the ground can become pockmarked with craters.

Transport helicopters may land, pick up or unload infantry. Soldiers and tank crews can perish from radiation sickness whilst in towns irradiated by nuclear attack, facilitating the use of special NBC troops to sanitise the radiated area. Ground-to-air missiles may also attack aircraft.

Expanding on the single missions of the Blitzkrieg series, The Day After campaigns use a dynamic model, where the player can attack and defend against enemy formations as well as capture strategic economical and military objectives. Each campaign chapter has a special "end" mission, usually a large scale battle with multiple objectives.

Throughout each campaign, the player is given a reserve of standard units which as the campaign progresses per chapter begins to include more modern and state of the art or even experimental units as well.

== Sequel ==
A sequel, Cuban Missile Crisis: Ice Crusade, has been released. It is a stand-alone expansion to Cuban Missile Crisis set five years after the war.

== Sources ==
- G5 Software
