= Mitchell Recreation Area =

Area of Fremont-Winema National Forests, Oregon, United States

- U.S. National Register of Historic Places
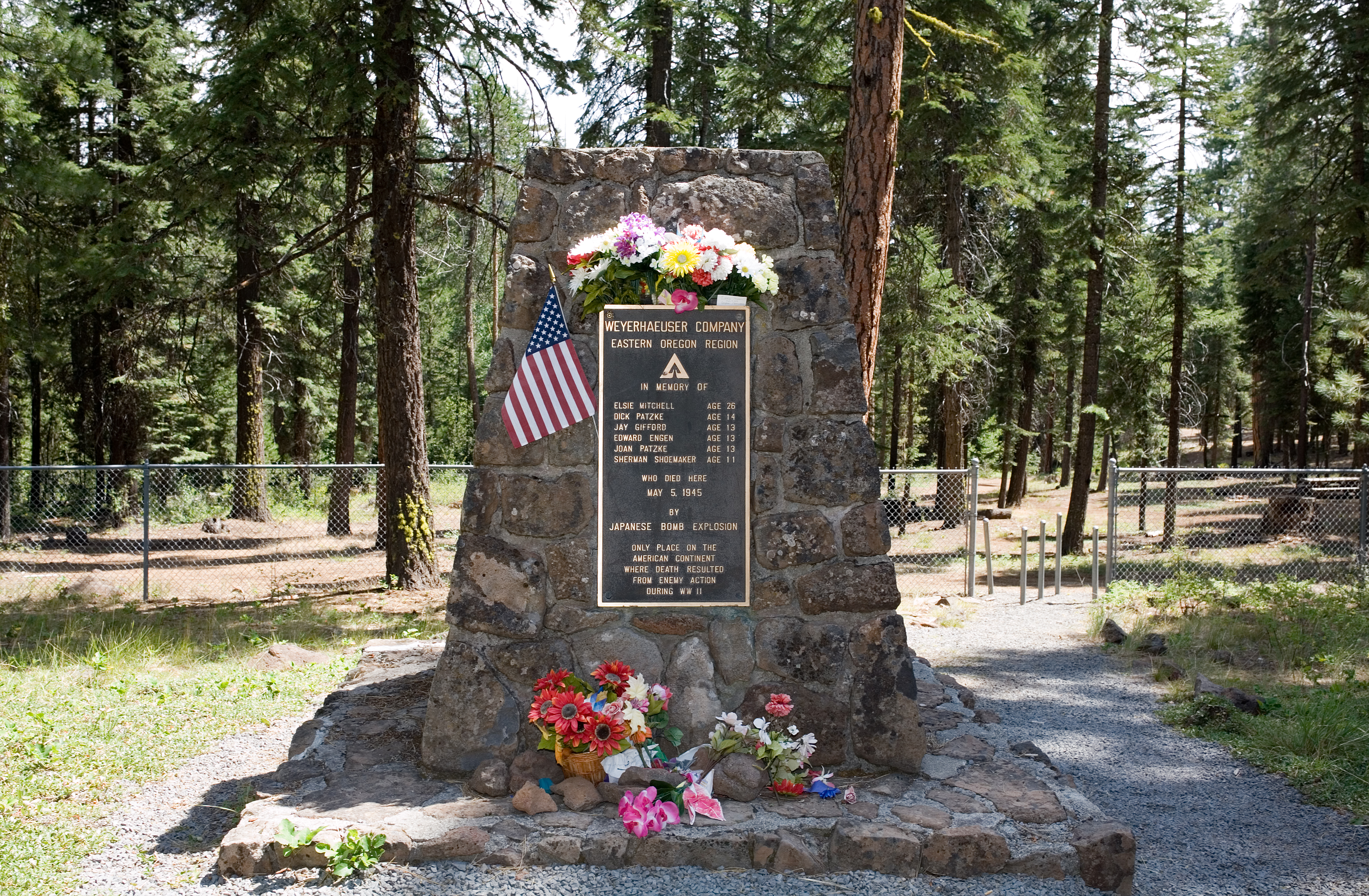
- Mitchell Monument
- Location: Fremont-Winema National Forests
- Nearest city: Bly, Oregon, USA
- Coordinates: 42.4316°N 120.8607°W
- Built: 1950
- NRHP reference No.: 03000050
- Added to NRHP: 2003

Mitchell Recreation Area is a small picnic area located in the Fremont-Winema National Forests, Lake County, Oregon, near the unincorporated community of Bly. In it stands the Mitchell Monument, erected in 1950, which marks the only location in the United States where Americans were killed during World War II as a direct result of a Japanese balloon bomb. The site is maintained by the United States Forest Service and was listed on the National Register of Historic Places in 2001.

== History ==
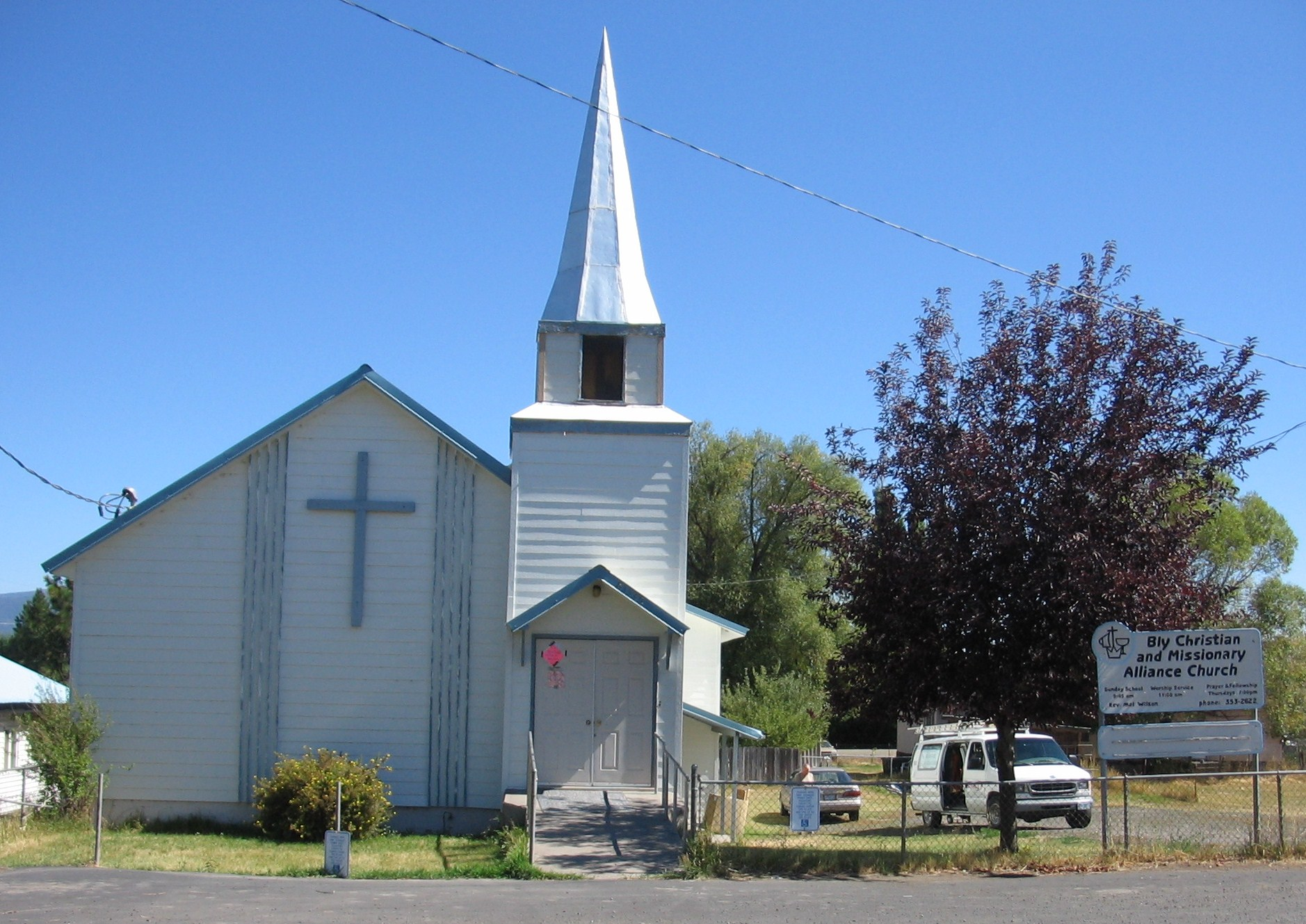
The Christian and Missionary Alliance church in Bly, Oregon

On May 5, 1945, Reverend Archie Mitchell took his pregnant wife and five Sunday school children, from the Christian and Missionary Alliance church where he was minister, on a picnic and fishing trip. The group found the logging road they followed blocked, so they stopped next to Leonard Creek, eight miles (13 km) east of Bly near Gearhart Mountain. While Mitchell was unloading the food, he heard one of the children say, "Look what I found!" His wife and the children ran to see what had been found. Moments later, there was an explosion. Mrs. Mitchell and the boys were killed instantly; one of the children, Joan, survived the initial blast but died minutes later. Rev. Mitchell's hands were burned from trying to put out Mrs. Mitchell's dress which had caught fire.

The children had found the remains of a Japanese balloon bomb, one of approximately 9,000 balloon bombs launched from Honshū, Japan between November 1944 and April 1945. The balloons drifted across the Pacific Ocean to North America via the jet stream in about three days. The hydrogen-filled balloons were 33 feet (10 m) in diameter and carried five bombs, four incendiaries and one anti-personnel high explosive. It is believed that as many as 1,000 balloons may have reached the United States and Canada. However, there were only 285 confirmed sightings on the west coast, and two balloons were later found in Michigan. Except for Elsye (aka Elsie) Mitchell and the five children killed near Bly, the bombs caused no injuries. These six individuals were the only Americans killed in the United States during World War II as a direct result of an Axis balloon bomb detonation. In 1976, Sakyo Adachi, a Japanese scientist who helped plan the balloon offense, visited the site and laid a wreath at the monument. He later sent a letter of apologies to the Patzke family for the loss of their two children.

In 1995, Japanese students sent 1,000 paper cranes, a Japanese symbol of peace and healing, to the families of the victims. Six cherry trees were also delivered to Bly to be planted at the site. One of the cherry trees was planted just north of the fenced monument site. The remaining trees were planted inside the fenced area. Later that year, over 500 people attended the 50th anniversary re-dedication ceremony at the Mitchell Monument site.

The Mitchell Monument site was originally owned by Weyerhaeuser Corporation. In 1996, Weyerhaeuser donated land around the monument to the Fremont National Forest (now the Fremont-Winema National Forests). Additional property was added to the site in 1997. A small picnic area was developed around the monument.

During the summer of 2021, the Bootleg Fire burned over the area surrounding Mitchell Monument. However, fire crews were able to save the historic site from the flames. As the fire approached, fire crews trimmed low hanging tree branches and built a fire line around the monument site. They also wrapped the shrapnel tree and the stone monument in a fire-resistant material similar to the material used for the firefighter's emergency shelters. As a result, when the fire passed through the adjacent forest, the monument was undamaged.

== Monument ==
The Mitchell Monument was erected by Weyerhaeuser in 1950. It was designed by Tom Orr, a Weyerhaeuser forester. The stone structure was built by Robert H. Anderson, a local monument builder and stonemason. It is constructed of native stone and displays a bronze plaque with the names and ages of the victims of the balloon bomb explosion. It commemorates the "only place on the American continent where death resulted from enemy action during World War II". Approximately 500 people attended the monument's dedication on August 20, 1950. Oregon Governor Douglas McKay spoke at the ceremony.

Here are the words from the monument plaque:

WEYERHAUSER COMPANY

EASTERN OREGON REGION

IN MEMORY OF
ELSIE MITCHELL AGE 26
DICK PATZKE AGE 14
JAY GIFFORD AGE 13
EDWARD ENGEN AGE 13
JOAN PATZKE AGE 13
SHERMAN SHOEMAKER AGE 11

WHO DIED HERE
MAY 5, 1945

BY
JAPANESE BOMB EXPLOSION

ONLY PLACE ON THE
AMERICAN CONTINENT
WHERE DEATH RESULTED
FROM ENEMY ACTION

DURING WORLD WAR II

— Mitchell Monument plaque

Because it commemorates an important wartime event that occurred at the site, the monument is of significant historical value. Therefore, the Mitchell Monument site was listed on the National Register of Historic Places on February 20, 2003.

== Recreation area ==
Today, the Bly Ranger District maintains Mitchell Recreation Area as a day-use picnic area. The site covers 22.7 acres (9.2 ha). It is adjacent to Leonard Creek and is sheltered by large ponderosa pines. In addition to the monument, the site offers fishing, hiking, and wildlife viewing opportunities. The site is normally open from mid-May until the end of October. Adjacent to the monument is the "shrapnel tree", a ponderosa pine still bearing scars from the explosion. In 2005, the State of Oregon designated the shrapnel tree at the Mitchell Monument site as an Oregon Heritage Tree.

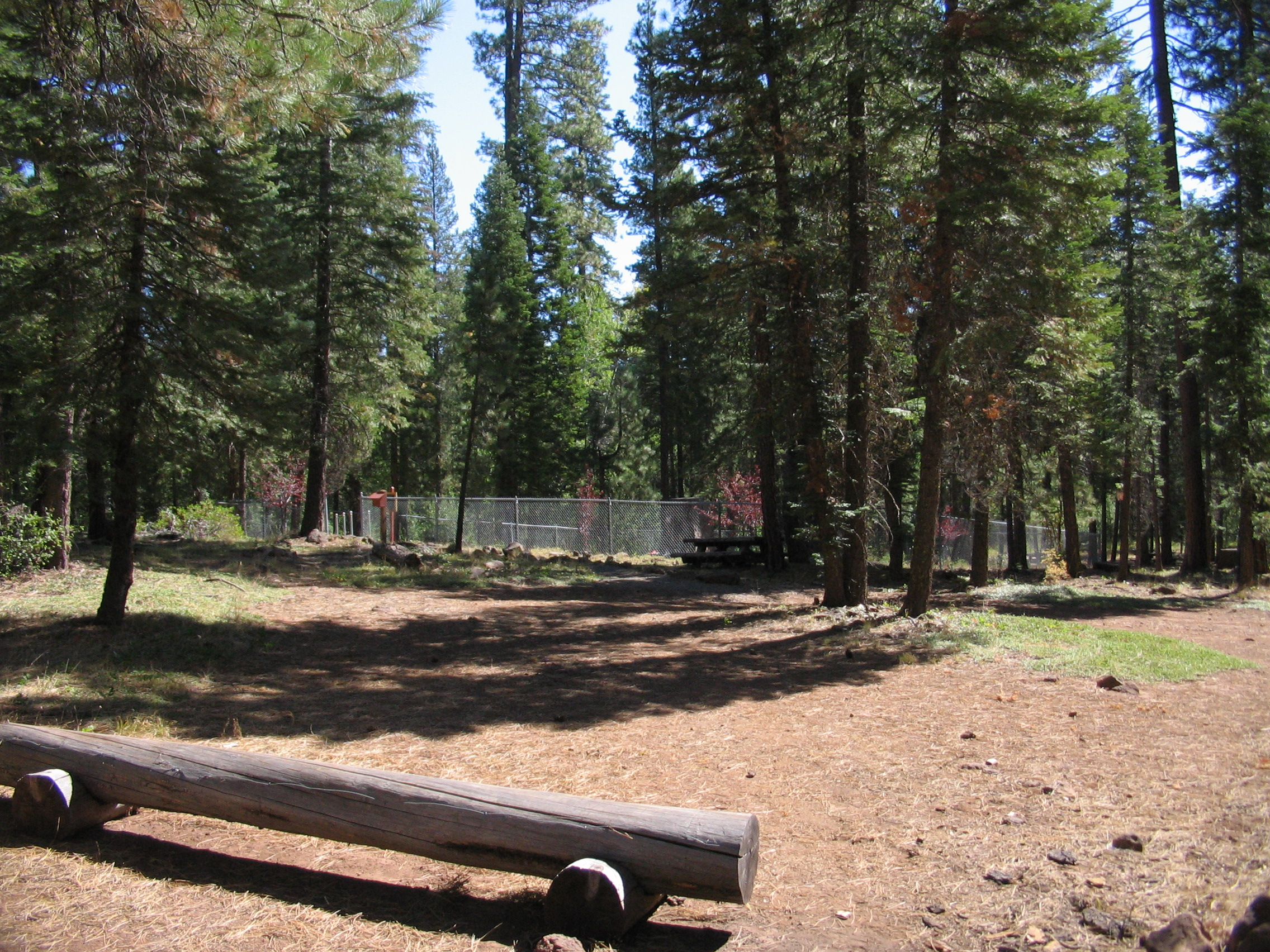
Mitchell recreation site

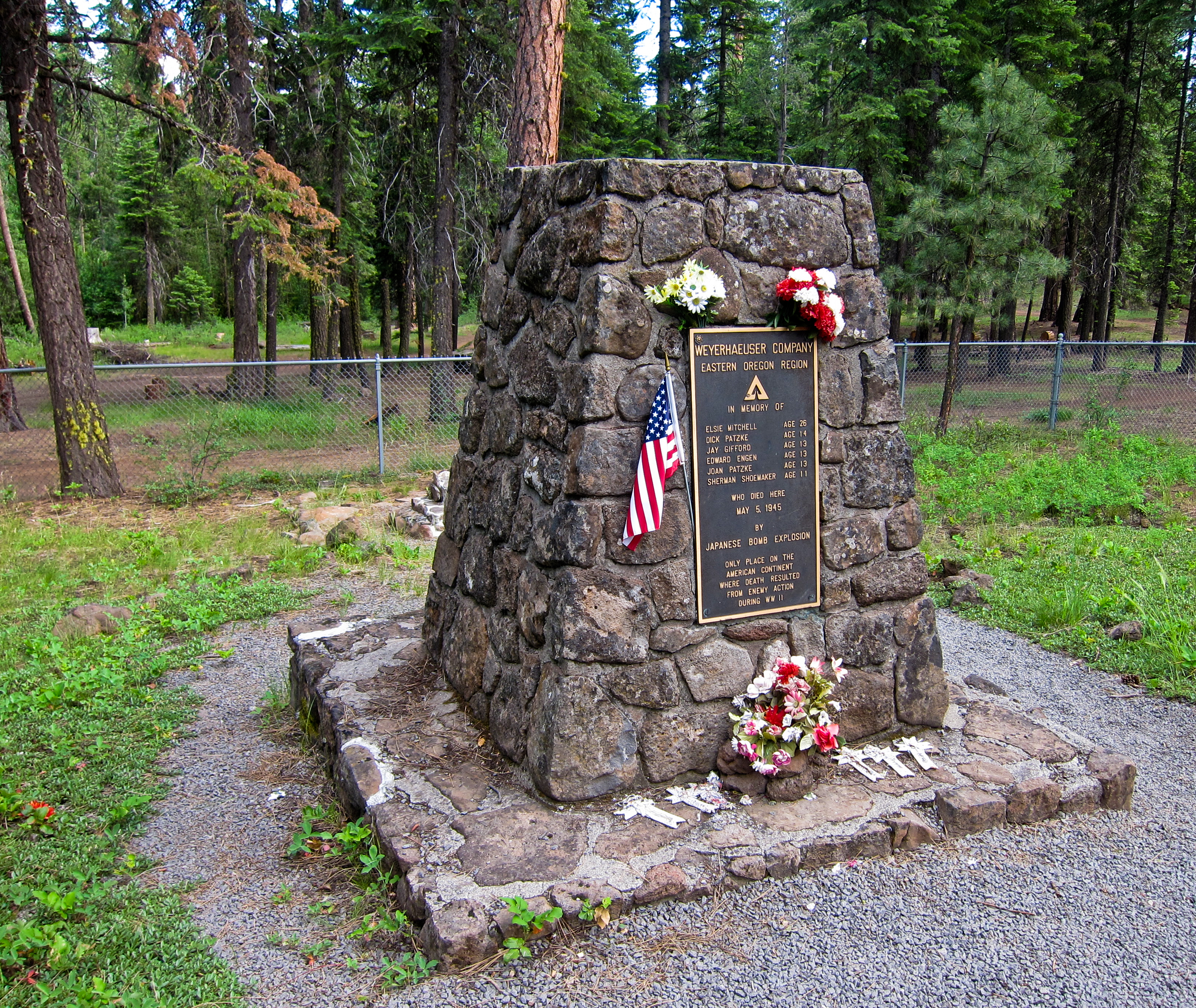
Mitchell Monument

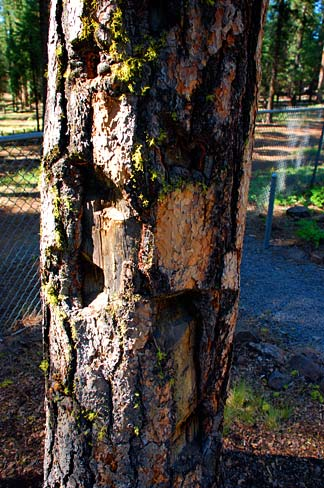
Shrapnel scarred tree

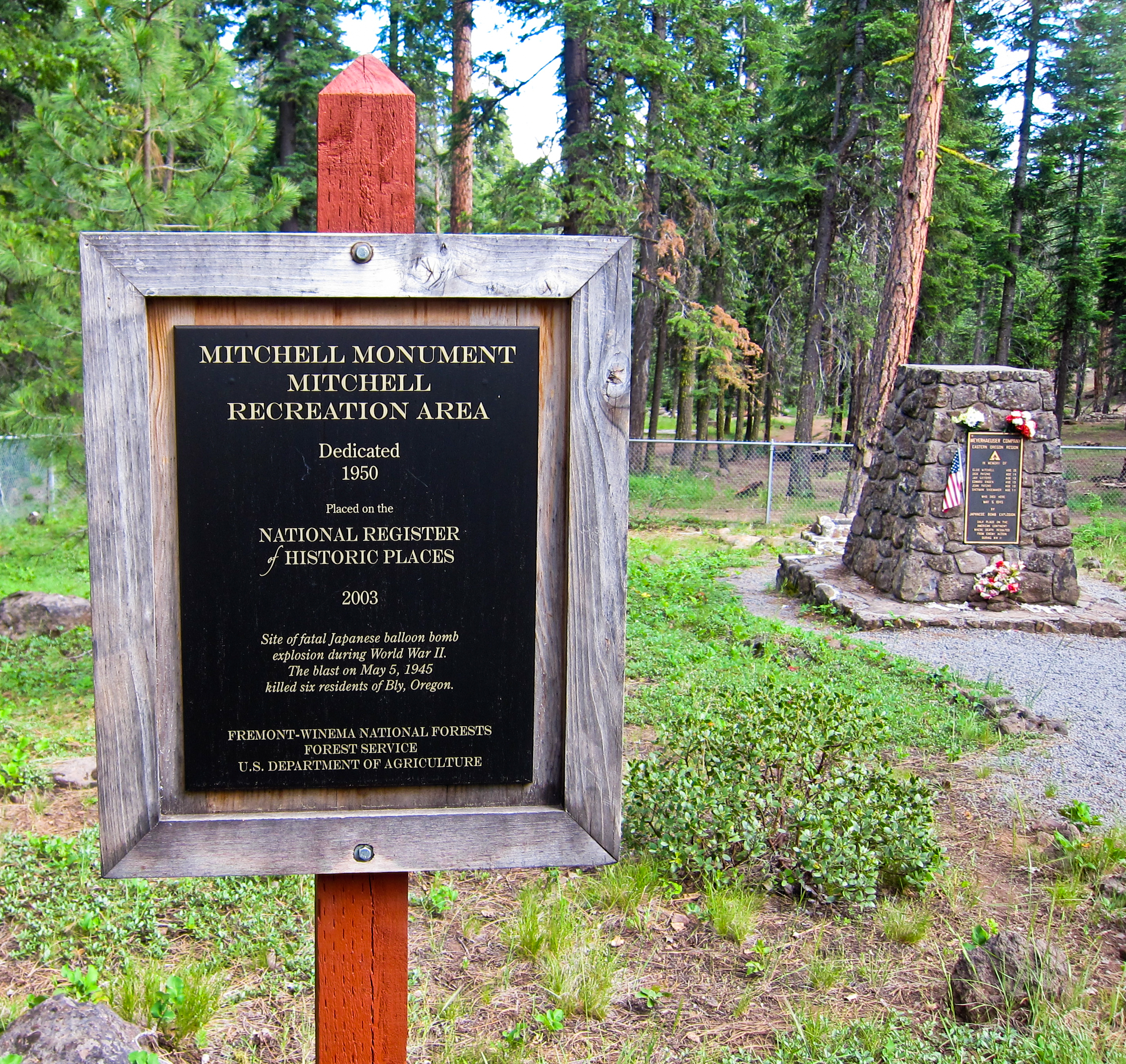
Historic site sign

== See also ==
- Lookout Air Raids
- Incendiary balloon
