= Broken-backed war theory =

Form of conflict that could happen after a massive nuclear exchange

Broken-backed war theory is a form of conflict that could happen after a massive nuclear exchange. Assuming that all participants have not been annihilated, there may arise a scenario unique to military strategy and theory, one in which all or some of the parties involved strive to continue fighting until the other side is completely defeated.

== Origin of the phrase ==
Broken-backed war theory was first formally elaborated on in the 1952 British Defence White Paper, to describe what would presumably happen after a major nuclear exchange. The American "New Look Strategy of 1953/54" rejected the notion of broken-backed war. They dropped the term from the 1955 white paper, and the phrase has since faded from common usage.

== Commentary ==
Klaus Knorr purported that in a broken-backed war scenario, only military weapons and vehicles on hand prior to the sustained hostilities would be of use, as the economic potential of both sides would be, at least in theory, greatly diminished:

Do current predictions on the nature of future warfare exhaust not only all possible, but all likely, contingencies? It can be granted that a long-drawn-out and massive war conducted with conventional, by which I mean modernized but nonatomic, weapons, is so unlikely to occur that it may be safely neglected as a contingency. There definitely is no future for World War II. It can also be granted that, once unlimited thermonuclear war has broken out, there is no economic war potential to be mobilized for its conduct. Even a broken-backed war would have to be fought overwhelmingly, if not entirely, with munitions on hand at the start of the fighting.

Herman Kahn, in his tome On Thermonuclear War, posited that a broken-backed war is implausible, because one side would likely absorb vastly more damage than its opposition.

The "broken-back" war notion is obsolete not only because of the possibility of mutual devastation but even more because it is so very unlikely that the forces of both sides would become attrited in even roughly the same way. One side is likely to get a rather commanding advantage and exploit this lead to force the other side to choose between surrender and the physical destruction of its capability to continue.

— Herman Kahn

The nuclear strategist Bernard Brodie argued that this form of conflict may be impractical simply because it is almost impossible to plan for. His writings on the subject came before the advent of counter-force doctrine, and during a time of nuclear plenty, when it was safe to assume that a nuclear exchange would render a nation's industry useless.

During the Cold War, Colonel Virgil Ney hypothesized that a nuclear exchange alone would not be enough to defeat the Soviet Union, and he argued for a modest construction of underground facilities and infrastructure.

== In popular culture ==
The table-top role-playing game Twilight: 2000 released by Game Designers' Workshop in 1984 entails a broken-backed war; in the aftermath of a nuclear exchange in 1997, by 2000, Warsaw Pact and NATO forces are still fighting for a decisive victory in Europe and elsewhere with dwindling conventional arms and munitions.

The plot of the 2005 video game Cuban Missile Crisis: The Aftermath is about an alternate history where world powers scramble for resources after the Cuban Missile Crisis results in an initial nuclear exchange between the United States and the Soviet Union, causing millions of casualties across the globe.
