= Hildebrand, Oregon =

Unincorporated community in the state of Oregon, United States

- Unincorporated community
- Location within Oregon and the United States Hildebrand (the United States)
- Coordinates: 42°17′52″N 121°28′46″W
- Country: United States
- State: Oregon
- County: Klamath
- Elevation: 4,193 ft (1,278 m)
- Time zone: UTC-8 (Pacific (PST))
  - Summer (DST): UTC-7 (PDT)
- GNIS feature ID: 1143594

Hildebrand is an unincorporated community in Klamath County, Oregon, United States. The community lies along Bliss Road off Oregon Route 140 northeast of Dairy.

Hildebrand had a station on the Oregon, California and Eastern Railway, which by 1929 reached from Klamath Falls to Bly. A 1941 timetable lists Hildebrand as the eighth stop east of Klamath Falls between Dairy and Horton. After 1990, the rail line passing near Hildebrand became part of a rail trail, the OC&E Woods Line State Trail, managed by the Oregon Parks and Recreation Department.

A post office was established here in August 1890, and its first postmaster was Newton F. Hildebrand. Edgewood was the original name assigned to the post office, but that was changed to Hildebrand in December 1890. Between 1919 and 1923, the post office was erroneously listed as Hilderbrand, which reverted to Hildebrand until the office permanently closed in 1942.
