= Hager, Oregon =

Unincorporated community in the state of Oregon, United States

- Unincorporated community
- Location within Oregon and the United States Hager (the United States)
- Coordinates: 42°11′29″N 121°42′01″W
- Country: United States
- State: Oregon
- County: Klamath
- Elevation: 4,173 ft (1,272 m)
- Time zone: UTC-8 (Pacific (PST))
  - Summer (DST): UTC-7 (PDT)
- GNIS feature ID: 1136350
- Coordinates and elevation from Geographic Names Information System

Hager is an unincorporated community in Klamath County, Oregon, United States. It is between Klamath Falls and Olene along Oregon Route 39 and Oregon Route 140.

Hager had a station on the Oregon, California and Eastern Railway, which by 1927 reached from Klamath Falls to Bly. A 1941 timetable lists Hager as the second stop east of Klamath Falls between it and Pine Grove. After 1990, the rail line passing through Hager became part of a rail trail, the OC&E Woods Line State Trail, managed by the Oregon Parks and Recreation Department.
