= Pine Grove, Klamath County, Oregon =

Unincorporated community in the state of Oregon, United States

- Unincorporated community
- Location within Oregon and the United States Pine Grove (the United States)
- Coordinates: 42°10′55″N 121°40′16″W
- Country: United States
- State: Oregon
- County: Klamath
- Elevation: 4,154 ft (1,266 m)
- Time zone: UTC-8 (Pacific (PST))
  - Summer (DST): UTC-7 (PDT)
- GNIS feature ID: 1125399

Pine Grove is an unincorporated community in Klamath County, Oregon, United States. Pine Grove lies south of Oregon Route 140 just east of its interchange with Oregon Route 39 near Altamont.

Pine Grove had a station on the Oregon, California and Eastern Railway, which by 1927 reached from Klamath Falls to Bly. A 1941 timetable lists Pine Grove as the third stop east of Klamath Falls between Hager and Olene.

After 1990, the rail line passing through Pine Grove became part of a rail trail, the OC&E Woods Line State Trail, managed by the Oregon Parks and Recreation Department. One of the trailheads on the 100-mile (160 km) trail is at Pine Grove.
