= Dairy, Oregon =

Unincorporated community in the state of Oregon, United States

- Unincorporated community
- Location within Oregon and the United States Dairy (the United States)
- Coordinates: 42°14′07″N 121°31′16″W
- Country: United States
- State: Oregon
- County: Klamath
- Elevation: 4,141 ft (1,262 m)
- Time zone: UTC-8 (Pacific (PST))
  - Summer (DST): UTC-7 (PDT)
- ZIP code: 97625
- Area codes: 458 and 541
- GNIS feature ID: 1119660

Dairy is an unincorporated community in Klamath County, Oregon, United States.

== History ==
According to Oregon Geographic Names, Dairy was named by William Roberts, a pioneer settler, who chose the name after living in another community by that name in the eastern United States. Roberts was the first postmaster of the Dairy post office, established in 1876.

Dairy lies in a valley formerly called Alkali Valley but later renamed Yonna Valley, its Klamath name. In 2004, the Klamath County Commissioners changed the name of Squaw Flat Road, which lies in the Yonna Valley slightly east of Dairy, to Bliss Road. Bliss Road runs generally north–south between Oregon Route 140 and the community of Sprague River.

Dairy had a station on the Oregon, California and Eastern Railway, which by 1927 reached from Klamath Falls to Bly. A 1941 timetable lists Hildebrand as the seventh stop east of Klamath Falls between Moyina and Hildebrand. After 1990, the rail line passing near Dairy became part of a rail trail, the OC&E Woods Line State Trail, managed by the Oregon Parks and Recreation Department.

== Geography ==
Dairy is along Oregon Route 140 at the west end of Oregon Route 70, and is about 19 miles (31 km) from Klamath Falls. The city of Bonanza is about 7 miles (11 km) to the southeast at the other end of Route 70, also known as the Dairy–Bonanza Highway.

=== Climate ===
This region experiences warm (but not hot) and dry summers, with no average monthly temperatures above 71.6 °F (22.0 °C). According to the Köppen Climate Classification system, Dairy has a warm-summer Mediterranean climate, abbreviated "Csb" on climate maps.
