= Pine Grove, Oregon =

Pine Grove, Oregon may refer to:

- Pine Grove, Hood River County, Oregon, a populated place
- Pine Grove, Klamath County, Oregon, a populated place
- Pine Grove, Umatilla County, Oregon, a locale
- Pine Grove, Wasco County, Oregon, a census-designated place
- Pine Grove, Washington County, Oregon, a former post office
