= Oregon, California and Eastern Railway =

Rail Line in USA

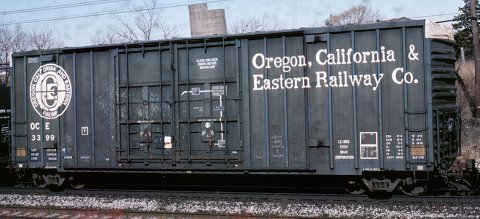
- OCE Boxcar

Overview
- Other name(s): Strahorn Line
- Status: Railbanked
- Locale: South-central Oregon
- Termini: Klamath Falls; Bly
- Stations: Klamath Falls, Hager, Pine Grove, Olene, Swan Lake, Movina, Dairy, Hildebrand, Horton, West Switch Back, East Switch Back, Sprague River, Beatty, Sycan, Kesterson Spur, North Fork, Bly

Technical
- Line length: 64 mi (103 km)
- Track gauge: 4 ft 8 1/2 in (1,435 mm)

The Oregon, California and Eastern Railway (OC&E) was a 64-mile (103 km) rail line between Klamath Falls and Bly in the U.S. state of Oregon. After 70 years of bringing logs from nearby forests to local sawmills, the former railroad right of way was converted to the OC&E Woods Line State Trail.

== Early history ==
In 1919, Robert E. Strahorn, a free-lance railroad builder and promoter, formed the OC&E by first acquiring an existing line, the Klamath Falls Municipal Railway, which ran 20 miles (32 km) between that city and Dairy. He planned to connect the OC&E to the Southern Pacific Railroad at Klamath Falls, the Oregon Trunk Line at Bend, the Union Pacific at Crane, and the Nevada–California–Oregon Railway at Lakeview. After establishing these connections, he hoped to sell the OC&E to one of the major railways.

Using operating revenues provided by twelve different logging companies along the route, by 1923 the line had been extended from Dairy to milepost 39 at Sprague River where a 1.63% westbound grade with two temporary switchbacks was built over Bly Mountain until money was available to bore a 1,300 ft (400 m) tunnel. The tunnel was never built, so operations continued through the summit switchback and a second switchback 1.23 mi (1.98 km) to the east. Strahorn sold the OC&E to Southern Pacific in 1925. Construction of the OC&E reached Bly in 1927. Southern Pacific sold a half-interest in the line to the Great Northern Railway in 1928. Southern Pacific and Great Northern alternated operating the OC&E for five-year periods. Trains pulled 8,000 carloads of logs annually using class O 2-8-2s and class F 2-8-0s during Great Northern management and class AC-1, AC-2 and AC-3 2-8-8-2s during Southern Pacific management. Both companies later used EMD SD9s and GP9s.

== Logging branch lines ==
A number of branch lines were built by logging companies to bring logs to the OC&E main line. Shaw-Bertram Lumber Company operated Shay locomotives from 1926 into the 1930s over 13 mi (21 km) of grades as steep as 5% connecting with OC&E just below the west switchback. Between 1922 and 1948 Ewauna Box Company operated a 15 mi (24 km) line northwest from Sprague River and an 18 mi (29 km) line east from Bly. From 1929 to 1934 Pelican Bay Lumber operated a 15 mi (24 km) line southeast from Bly. Until 1943 Crater Lake Lumber operated a 15 mi (24 km) line southeast from Sprague River. The largest and longest lasting connection was the Weyerhaeuser Woods Line extending 45 mi (72 km) north from Sycan to a place called 500 Transfer with branches serving logging camps 6, 9, and 15. Weyerhauser used two 2-8-2s and five 2-6-6-2s until steam was replaced by two Baldwin DS-4-4-750s and two Baldwin S-8s in 1950.

== Weyerhaeuser ownership ==
Log carloads increased to 18,000 annually as housing construction increased in the 1960s. Weyerhaeuser upgraded the mill at Bly and purchased the OC&E in 1975. Weyerhaeuser used three GP9s on the Woods Line and MK Rail rebuilt locomotives on the OC&E main line pulling a fleet of 329 log cars in addition to the cars carrying mill products for interchange with other railroads. Annual car loadings peaked at 35,000 in the late 1970s, including 4,000 loads of lumber and wood chips from the mill at Bly. Car loadings dropped to less than half that number in the early 1980s, and when local forests had been completely harvested, Weyerhaeuser ceased operations on 1 May 1990. The line's right of way was railbanked in 1992 to the Oregon Parks and Recreation Department, which converted it and the right of way of the Woods Line into the OC&E Woods Line State Trail.

== See also ==
- Rail trail
