= Area codes 541 and 458 =

Area codes for most of Oregon, United States

Coordinates: 44.5°N 121°W

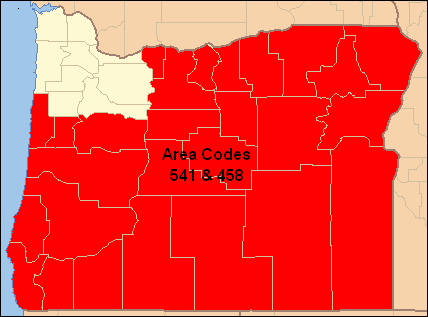
Numbering plan areas of Oregon. NPA 541 and 458 in red

Area codes 541 and 458 are telephone area codes in the North American Numbering Plan (NANP) for most of the U.S. state of Oregon, excluding only the northwestern corner of the state. The service area includes the cities of Eugene, Springfield, Corvallis, Albany, Grants Pass, Medford, Bend, Ashland, Klamath Falls, The Dalles, Burns, Lakeview, and Pendleton, as well as the coastal region from Lincoln County to the California border. Area code 541 was created in an area code split from area code 503 on November 5, 1995. Area code 458 was added to the same service area on February 10, 2010 to form an overlay.

== History ==
Area code 503 was used for the entire state of Oregon until November 5, 1995, when the numbering plan area was reduced to just the populous northwestern corner of the state, including Portland and Salem, and area code 541 began service for the rest of the state. The dividing line ran east and south of Portland.

This was intended as a long-term solution, as northwest Oregon contains most of Oregon's population, and with it the great majority of Oregon's landlines and cell phones. However, by 2007, 541 was quickly exhausting central office codes, due to the proliferation of cell phones and pagers, particularly in Eugene, Corvallis and Medford.

To mitigate central office code exhaustion, the Oregon Public Utility Commission approved an overlay numbering plan with area code 458 for the entire area, resulting in mandatory 10-digit dialing for that area. An overlay was chosen rather than a split to spare residents, particularly those east of the Willamette Valley, the expense of changing their numbers. Oregon's other NPA (503/971) already had this requirement. Ten-digit dialing was phased in beginning in July 2009, becoming mandatory in January 2010. The first exchange to be issued in the 458 area code was 205 in Eugene in August 2011.

The numbering plan area comprises parts of four local access and transport areas (LATAs). Most of the numbering plan area is part of the Portland LATA, while the southwest portion is the Eugene LATA. Malheur County is part of the Boise/southern Idaho LATA and the Quinn, Oregon, exchange, in the Reno/northern Nevada LATA, while part of northeast Oregon is in the Spokane, Washington LATA

== Central office codes ==
Central office prefixes of area code 541
Prefix	Location	County	Introduced
200	Gold Hill	Jackson	October 3, 2011
201	Ashland	Jackson	January 25, 1998
202	Myrtle Creek	Douglas	January 24, 2007
203	Milton-Freewater	Umatilla	June 27, 2002
204	Heppner	Morrow	June 19, 2014
205	Klamath Falls	Klamath	June 30, 2001
206	Eugene	Lane	June 30, 2001
207	Corvallis	Benton	June 30, 2001
209	Jefferson	Marion	April 4, 2013
210	Medford	Jackson	June 13, 2000
212	Ontario	Malheur	March 22, 2001
213	Bend	Deschutes	October 30, 2012
214	Eugene	Lane	December 12, 2011
215	Pendleton	Umatilla	January 13, 2005
216	Ontario	Malheur	May 6, 2004
217	Coos Bay	Coos	March 3, 2001
218	Grants Pass	Josephine	June 30, 2001
219	Lakeview	Lake	January 10, 1996
220	Albany	Linn	June 13, 2000
221	Eugene	Lane	May 10, 1999
222	Eugene	Lane	November 2, 2007
223	Albany	Linn	July 22, 1999
224	Corvallis	Benton	July 22, 1999
225	Eugene	Lane	July 22, 1999
226	Grants Pass	Josephine	July 22, 1999
227	Medford	Jackson	July 22, 1999
228	Eugene	Lane	March 22, 2001
229	Roseburg	Douglas	March 3, 2001
230	Corvallis	Benton	May 10, 1999
231	Corvallis	Benton	May 10, 1999
232	Springfield	Lane	June 30, 2001
233	Prineville	Crook	June 30, 2001
234	Eugene	Lane	June 30, 2001
235	Ontario	Malheur	February 16, 2001
236	Roseburg	Douglas	January 19, 2001
237	Grants Pass	Josephine	June 18, 2001
238	Klamath Falls	Klamath	June 18, 2001
239	Brookings	Curry	June 18, 2001
240	Pendleton	Umatilla	July 22, 1999
241	Bend	Deschutes	February 16, 2001
242	Eugene	Lane	November 20, 1998
243	Corvallis	Benton	January 14, 2000
244	Grants Pass	Josephine	March 22, 2001
245	Medford	Jackson	July 22, 1999
246	Eugene	Lane	January 14, 2000
247	Gold Beach	Curry	January 10, 1996
248	Albany	Linn	January 14, 2000
249	Baker City	Baker	March 25, 2002
250	Corvallis	Benton	June 13, 2000
251	Brookings	Curry	July 22, 1999
252	Coos Bay	Coos	March 22, 2001
253	Port Orford	Curry	June 19, 2002
254	Brookings	Curry	August 1, 2002
255	Eugene	Lane	December 19, 2005
256	Heppner	Morrow	September 6, 2002
257	Corvallis	Benton	October 31, 2000
258	Lebanon	Linn	January 10, 1996
259	Lebanon	Linn	January 10, 1996
260	Coos Bay	Coos	July 22, 1999
261	Medford	Jackson	June 13, 2000
262	Oregon Slope	Malheur	January 10, 1996
263	Enterprise	Wallowa	October 16, 2003
264	Newport	Lincoln	December 18, 2001
265	Newport	Lincoln	January 10, 1996
266	Coos Bay	Coos	October 11, 1997
267	Coos Bay	Coos	January 10, 1996
268	Mapleton	Lane	January 10, 1996
269	Coos Bay	Coos	January 10, 1996
270	Newport	Lincoln	January 10, 1996
271	Reedsport	Douglas	January 10, 1996
272	Newport	Lincoln	August 14, 1998
273	Klamath Falls	Klamath	February 27, 1999
274	Klamath Falls	Klamath	February 25, 2002
275	Umatilla	Umatilla	March 11, 2011
276	Pendleton	Umatilla	January 10, 1996
277	Newport	Lincoln	January 10, 1996
278	Pendleton	Umatilla	January 10, 1996
279	Madras	Jefferson	March 3, 2001
280	Bend	Deschutes	June 13, 2000
281	Klamath Falls	Klamath	July 22, 1999
282	Medford	Jackson	June 13, 2000
283	Newport	Lincoln	April 17, 2001
284	Eugene	Lane	July 22, 1999
285	Eugene	Lane	July 22, 1999
286	Corvallis	Benton	May 10, 1999
287	Cave Junction	Josephine	April 17, 2001
288	The Dalles	Wasco	August 17, 2001
289	Hermiston	Umatilla	January 19, 2001
290	Coos Bay	Coos	January 10, 1996
291	Grants Pass	Josephine	August 20, 2000
292	Medford	Jackson	October 23, 2001
293	Nyssa	Malheur	June 22, 2011
294	Coos Bay	Coos	August 1, 2002
295	Grants Pass	Josephine	October 23, 2001
296	The Dalles	Wasco	January 10, 1996
297	Coos Bay	Coos	January 19, 2001
298	The Dalles	Wasco	January 10, 1996
299	Rogue River	Jackson	September 25, 2006
300	The Dalles	Wasco	January 14, 2000
301	Medford	Jackson	August 20, 2000
302	Eugene	Lane	January 10, 1996
303	Coos Bay	Coos	May 16, 2001
304	Reedsport	Douglas	June 18, 2001
305	Florence	Lane	June 18, 2001
306	Bend	Deschutes	February 25, 2002
307	Philomath	Benton	March 13, 2009
308	Hood River	Hood River	January 10, 1996
309	Bend	Deschutes	January 10, 2001
310	Pendleton	Umatilla	August 20, 2000
312	Bend	Deschutes	May 10, 1999
313	Oakridge	Lane	March 12, 2012
314	Hermiston	Umatilla	August 17, 2001
315	Oakland	Douglas	February 25, 2002
316	Redmond	Deschutes	October 31, 2001
317	Bend	Deschutes	January 10, 1996
318	Bend	Deschutes	April 1, 1997
319	Reedsport	Douglas	December 5, 2007
320	Sumpter	Baker	October 4, 2005
321	Junction City	Lane	October 31, 2000
322	Bend	Deschutes	August 20, 2000
323	Bend	Deschutes	November 18, 2005
324	Medford	Jackson	February 25, 2002
325	Madras	Jefferson	November 20, 1998
326	Medford	Jackson	May 3, 2002
327	Jefferson	Marion	January 10, 1996
328	Pine Grove	Wasco	January 10, 1996
329	Bandon	Coos	January 12, 2006
330	Bend	Deschutes	April 15, 1996
331	Klamath Falls	Klamath	October 31, 2000
332	Port Orford	Curry	January 10, 1996
333	Grass Valley	Sherman	January 10, 1996
334	Eugene	Lane	January 10, 1996
335	Eugene	Lane	March 3, 2001
336	Toledo	Lincoln	January 10, 1996
337	Eugene	Lane	October 15, 1996
338	Eugene	Lane	October 15, 1996
339	Ridgeview	Malheur	January 10, 1996
340	The Dalles	Wasco	October 31, 2000
341	Eugene	Lane	January 10, 1996
342	Eugene	Lane	January 10, 1996
343	Eugene	Lane	January 10, 1996
344	Eugene	Lane	January 10, 1996
345	Eugene	Lane	January 10, 1996
346	Eugene	Lane	January 10, 1996
347	Bandon	Coos	January 10, 1996
348	Langlois	Curry	January 10, 1996
349	Eugene	Lane	April 1, 1997
350	Bend	Deschutes	January 11, 1997
351	Newport	Lincoln	April 17, 2002
352	Parkdale	Hood River	January 10, 1996
353	Bly	Klamath	January 10, 1996
354	Odell	Hood River	January 10, 1996
355	Bend	Deschutes	September 5, 2008
356	Rocky Point	Klamath	January 10, 1996
357	Eugene	Lane	June 26, 2008
358	Harper	Malheur	January 10, 1996
359	Eugene	Lane	May 3, 2002
360	Corvallis	Benton	December 12, 2003
361	Reedsport	Douglas	July 22, 1999
362	Prineville	Crook	March 13, 2002
363	Klamath Falls	Klamath	April 25, 2002
364	Lincoln City	Lincoln	June 17, 2002
365	Chemult	Klamath	January 10, 1996
366	Port Orford	Curry	May 14, 2002
367	Sweet Home	Linn	January 10, 1996
368	Corvallis	Benton	May 3, 2002
369	Halsey	Linn	January 10, 1996
370	The Dalles	Wasco	June 17, 2002
371	Hermiston	Umatilla	April 2, 2014
372	Nyssa	Malheur	January 10, 1996
373	Gold Beach	Curry	August 1, 2002
374	Cascade Locks	Hood River	January 10, 1996
375	Roseburg	Douglas	June 17, 2008
376	Echo	Umatilla	January 10, 1996
377	Pendleton	Umatilla	July 6, 1997
378	Roseburg	Douglas	June 13, 2000
379	Pendleton	Umatilla	January 10, 1996
380	Hood River	Hood River	January 14, 2000
381	Fort Klamath	Klamath	January 10, 1996
382	Bend	Deschutes	January 10, 1996
383	Bend	Deschutes	January 10, 1996
384	Condon	Gilliam	January 10, 1996
385	Bend	Deschutes	January 10, 1996
386	Hood River	Hood River	January 10, 1996
387	Hood River	Hood River	January 10, 1996
388	Bend	Deschutes	January 10, 1996
389	Bend	Deschutes	January 10, 1996
390	Bend	Deschutes	March 3, 2001
391	Roseburg	Douglas	May 10, 1999
392	Cascade Locks	Hood River	August 14, 2002
393	Eugene	Lane	March 3, 2001
394	Grass Valley	Sherman	August 14, 2002
395	Maupin	Wasco	January 10, 1996
396	Coquille	Coos	January 10, 1996
397	The Dalles	Wasco	July 30, 2002
398	Enterprise	Wallowa	August 29, 2002
399	Hood River	Hood River	September 4, 2002
400	Hood River	Hood River	October 31, 2000
401	Lebanon	Linn	January 10, 1996
402	Parkdale	Hood River	August 14, 2002
403	Baker City	Baker	September 6, 2002
404	Coos Bay	Coos	September 9, 2002
405	Lebanon	Linn	February 9, 2003
406	Baker City	Baker	September 17, 2002
407	Lakeview	Lake	January 11, 2008
408	Bend	Deschutes	January 10, 1996
409	Lebanon	Linn	January 10, 1996
410	Bend	Deschutes	January 10, 1996
412	Brookings	Curry	January 10, 1996
413	Burns	Harney	September 6, 2002
414	Medford	Jackson	March 5, 2009
415	Cave Junction	Josephine	March 12, 2003
416	Prineville	Crook	January 10, 1996
417	Lakeview	Lake	September 9, 2002
418	Lincoln City	Lincoln	September 12, 2002
419	Bend	Deschutes	January 10, 1996
420	Bend	Deschutes	January 10, 1996
421	Long Creek	Grant	January 10, 1996
422	Ione	Morrow	January 10, 1996
423	Central Point	Jackson	July 1, 2003
424	Bellfountain	Benton	January 10, 1996
425	Gold Beach	Curry	August 5, 2003
426	Enterprise	Wallowa	January 10, 1996
427	Ukiah	Umatilla	January 10, 1996
428	Pilot Rock	Umatilla	January 10, 1996
429	Pendleton	Umatilla	September 4, 2003
430	Roseburg	Douglas	April 15, 1996
431	Eugene	Lane	April 15, 1996
432	Joseph	Wallowa	January 10, 1996
433	Gilchrist	Klamath	January 10, 1996
434	Eugene	Lane	January 14, 2000
435	Coos Bay	Coos	July 2, 2003
436	Hood River	Hood River	August 17, 2004
437	Elgin	Union	May 8, 2001
438	Harlan	Benton	January 10, 1996
439	Powers	Coos	January 10, 1996
440	Roseburg	Douglas	January 10, 1996
441	Grants Pass	Josephine	October 31, 2000
442	Wasco	Wasco	January 10, 1996
443	Pilot Rock	Umatilla	January 10, 1996
444	Siletz	Lincoln	January 10, 1996
445	Camas Valley	Douglas	January 10, 1996
446	Hereford-Unity	Baker	January 10, 1996
447	Prineville	Crook	January 10, 1996
448	Bates	Grant	January 10, 1996
449	Stanfield	Umatilla	January 10, 1996
450	Grants Pass	Josephine	January 10, 1996
451	Lebanon	Linn	January 10, 1996
452	Corvallis	Benton	June 30, 2001
453	Blodgett	Benton	January 10, 1996
454	Arlington	Gilliam	January 10, 1996
455	Arlington	Gilliam	November 17, 2004
456	Summit	Benton	January 10, 1996
457	Helix	Umatilla	January 10, 1996
459	Sutherlin	Douglas	January 10, 1996
460	Madras	Jefferson	December 6, 2004
461	Eugene	Lane	January 10, 1996
462	Mitchell	Wheeler	January 10, 1996
463	Eugene	Lane	May 10, 1999
464	Roseburg	Douglas	July 22, 1999
465	Eugene	Lane	January 10, 1996
466	Brownsville	Linn	January 10, 1996
467	Dufur	Wasco	January 10, 1996
468	Spray	Wheeler	January 10, 1996
469	Brookings	Curry	January 10, 1996
470	Huntington	Malheur	September 4, 2008
471	Grants Pass	Josephine	January 10, 1996
472	Grants Pass	Josephine	April 1, 1997
473	Vale	Malheur	January 10, 1996
474	Grants Pass	Josephine	January 10, 1996
475	Madras	Jefferson	January 10, 1996
476	Grants Pass	Josephine	January 10, 1996
477	Paulina	Crook	January 10, 1996
478	Mosier	Wasco	January 10, 1996
479	Grants Pass	Josephine	January 10, 1996
480	Bend	Deschutes	January 10, 1996
481	Boardman	Morrow	January 10, 1996
482	Ashland	Jackson	January 10, 1996
483	Tygh Valley	Wasco	January 10, 1996
484	Eugene	Lane	January 10, 1996
485	Eugene	Lane	January 10, 1996
486	Lobster Valley	Benton	January 10, 1996
487	Alsea	Benton	January 10, 1996
488	Ashland	Jackson	January 10, 1996
489	Antelope	Wasco	January 10, 1996
490	Hood River	Hood River	January 10, 1996
491	Shedd	Linn	January 10, 1996
492	Roseburg	Douglas	June 13, 2000
493	North Harney	Harney	January 10, 1996
494	Medford	Jackson	June 13, 2000
495	South Harney	Harney	January 10, 1996
496	Glide	Douglas	January 10, 1996
497	Albany	Linn	June 30, 2001
498	North Umpqua	Douglas	January 10, 1996
499	Medford	Jackson	April 3, 2007
500	Medford	Jackson	August 31, 2012
501	Eugene	Lane	January 10, 1996
502	Gold Hill	Jackson	January 19, 2012
504	Redmond	Deschutes	April 1, 1997
505	Eugene	Lane	October 3, 2005
506	The Dalles	Wasco	April 15, 1996
507	Grants Pass	Josephine	August 1, 2012
508	Bend	Deschutes	October 8, 2008
510	Eugene	Lane	January 14, 2000
512	Phoenix	Jackson	January 10, 1996
513	Eugene	Lane	August 14, 1998
514	Eugene	Lane	October 13, 1999
515	Eugene	Lane	October 13, 1999
516	Redmond	Deschutes	February 21, 2007
517	Eugene	Lane	January 10, 1996
518	Baker City	Baker	March 22, 2001
519	Baker City	Baker	January 10, 1996
520	Eugene	Lane	April 1, 1997
521	Eugene	Lane	January 10, 1996
522	Quinn	Malheur	January 10, 1996
523	Baker City	Baker	January 10, 1996
524	Baker City	Baker	July 6, 1997
525	Eugene	Lane	May 27, 2008
526	Redmond	Deschutes	October 30, 2003
527	Redmond	Deschutes	October 28, 2015
528	Tidewater	Lincoln	January 10, 1996
529	Oakland	Douglas	November 12, 2015
530	Roseburg	Douglas	July 1, 1996
531	Ashland	Jackson	June 30, 2001
532	Pendleton	Umatilla	September 4, 2008
533	Sprague River	Klamath	January 10, 1996
534	Imbler	Union	January 10, 1996
535	Phoenix	Jackson	January 10, 1996
536	La Pine	Deschutes	January 10, 1996
537	Roseburg	Douglas	February 20, 2007
538	White City	Jackson	March 3, 2001
539	Klamath Falls	Klamath	November 17, 2005
540	Richland	Baker	February 16, 2001
542	Seneca	Grant	January 10, 1996
543	Eugene	Lane	October 15, 1996
544	Wamic	Wasco	January 10, 1996
545	Bonanza	Klamath	January 10, 1996
546	Culver	Jefferson	January 10, 1996
547	Yachats	Lincoln	January 10, 1996
548	Redmond	Deschutes	January 10, 1996
549	Sisters	Deschutes	January 10, 1996
550	Bend	Deschutes	September 20, 2005
551	Bandon	Coos	August 12, 2002
552	Ashland	Jackson	January 10, 1996
553	Madras-Warm Springs	Jefferson	January 10, 1996
554	Eugene	Lane	January 10, 1996
556	Eugene	Lane	October 11, 1997
557	Lincoln City	Lincoln	January 11, 1997
558	Stateline	Umatilla	January 10, 1996
559	Myrtle Point	Coos	September 27, 2007
560	Prospect	Jackson	January 10, 1996
561	Hermiston	Umatilla	January 10, 1996
562	Union	Union	January 10, 1996
563	Waldport	Lincoln	January 10, 1996
564	Hermiston	Umatilla	January 10, 1996
565	Moro	Sherman	January 10, 1996
566	Athena	Umatilla	January 10, 1996
567	Hermiston	Umatilla	January 10, 1996
568	Cove	Union	January 10, 1996
569	Lostine	Wallowa	January 10, 1996
570	Lebanon	Linn	October 31, 2000
571	Myrtle Point	Coos	October 13, 1999
572	Myrtle Point	Coos	January 10, 1996
573	Burns	Harney	January 10, 1996
574	Newport	Lincoln	January 10, 1996
575	John Day	Grant	January 10, 1996
576	Silver Lake	Lake	January 10, 1996
577	Joseph	Wallowa	January 10, 1996
578	Mosier	Wasco	January 14, 2000
579	Eugene	Lane	January 11, 1997
580	Roseburg	Douglas	June 30, 2001
581	Lowell	Lane	May 1, 2015
582	Rogue River	Josephine	January 10, 1996
583	Harrisburg	Linn	May 6, 2015
584	Elkton	Douglas	January 10, 1996
585	Bend	Deschutes	June 30, 2001
586	Jordan Valley	Malheur	January 10, 1996
587	Scottsburg	Douglas	January 10, 1996
588	Sisters	Deschutes	January 14, 2000
589	Burns	Harney	January 10, 1996
590	Florence	Lane	February 17, 2009
591	Klamath Falls	Klamath	November 20, 1998
592	Cave Junction	Josephine	January 10, 1996
593	Bend	Deschutes	January 10, 1996
594	Prospect	Jackson	January 10, 1996
595	Camp Sherman	Deschutes	January 10, 1996
596	O'Brien	Josephine	January 10, 1996
597	Selma	Josephine	January 10, 1996
598	Bend	Deschutes	February 27, 1999
599	Ash Valley	Douglas	January 10, 1996
600	Eugene	Lane	October 23, 2012
601	Medford	Jackson	January 10, 1996
602	Corvallis	Benton	July 1, 1996
603	Eugene	Lane	June 10, 2008
604	Redmond	Deschutes	April 17, 2007
605	Reedsport	Douglas	November 19, 2008
606	Eugene	Lane	June 18, 2001
607	Eugene	Lane	January 10, 1996
608	Medford	Jackson	January 10, 1996
609	Philomath	Benton	January 10, 1996
610	Bend	Deschutes	June 30, 2001
612	Pendleton	Umatilla	June 30, 2001
613	Medford	Jackson	September 14, 2009
614	Lincoln City	Lincoln	February 14, 2008
615	Madras	Jefferson	July 29, 2011
616	Boardman	Morrow	February 13, 2006
617	Bend	Deschutes	May 18, 1998
618	Medford	Jackson	November 20, 1998
619	Albany	Linn	January 10, 1996
620	John Day	Grant	November 20, 1998
621	Medford	Jackson	November 20, 1998
622	Medford	Jackson	July 17, 2001
623	Cottage Grove	Lane	September 14, 2001
624	La Grande	Union	September 18, 2001
625	Ashland	Jackson	May 5, 2015
626	Umatilla	Umatilla	November 7, 2006
627	Mitchell	Wheeler	September 3, 2008
628	John Day	Grant	September 4, 2008
629	Culver	Jefferson	March 10, 2010
630	Central Point	Jackson	January 9, 2013
631	Ashland	Jackson	October 16, 2012
632	Eugene	Lane	March 25, 2010
633	Bend	Deschutes	February 3, 2006
634	Spray	Wheeler	September 3, 2008
635	Toledo	Lincoln	January 9, 2008
636	Eugene	Lane	February 26, 2008
637	Roseburg	Douglas	August 23, 2006
638	Camp Sherman	Deschutes	May 11, 2010
639	Bend	Deschutes	March 16, 2009
640	Bend	Deschutes	September 17, 2015
641	Yoncalla	Douglas	August 28, 2008
642	Eugene	Lane	June 21, 2018
643	Roseburg	Douglas	November 20, 1998
644	Harrisburg	Linn	June 16, 2009
645	Hood River	Hood River	October 23, 2009
646	Medford	Jackson	May 15, 2006
647	Bend	Deschutes	August 27, 2007
648	Siletz	Lincoln	June 1, 2007
649	Cottage Grove	Lane	May 11, 2009
650	Eugene	Lane	January 18, 2016
651	Fossil	Wheeler	September 4, 2008
652	Beatty	Klamath	August 28, 2008
653	Eugene	Lane	March 25, 2002
654	Eugene	Lane	August 16, 2005
655	Langlois	Curry	August 12, 2002
656	Hermiston	Umatilla	November 6, 2009
657	Brownsville	Linn	December 17, 2015
658	Creswell	Lane	January 11, 2008
659	Grants Pass	Josephine	May 10, 1999
660	Grants Pass	Josephine	January 10, 1996
661	Brookings	Curry	February 16, 2001
662	Reedsport	Douglas	February 16, 2001
663	La Grande	Union	August 14, 1998
664	Central Point	Jackson	January 10, 1996
665	Central Point	Jackson	February 27, 1999
666	Albany	Linn	January 20, 2016
667	Hermiston	Umatilla	November 20, 1998
668	Bend	Deschutes	August 15, 2014
669	Lincoln City	Lincoln	June 18, 2007
670	Roseburg	Douglas	January 10, 1996
671	Roseburg	Douglas	February 27, 1999
672	Roseburg	Douglas	January 10, 1996
673	Roseburg	Douglas	January 10, 1996
674	Oakridge	Lane	December 14, 2015
675	Madras	Jefferson	December 1, 2016
676	Heppner	Morrow	January 10, 1996
677	Roseburg	Douglas	January 11, 1997
678	Bend	Deschutes	February 15, 2006
679	Roseburg	Douglas	January 10, 1996
680	Roseburg	Douglas	October 31, 2000
681	Eugene	Lane	May 18, 1998
682	Eugene	Lane	October 15, 1996
683	Eugene	Lane	January 10, 1996
684	Eugene	Lane	January 11, 1997
685	Eugene	Lane	May 18, 1998
686	Eugene	Lane	January 10, 1996
687	Eugene	Lane	January 10, 1996
688	Eugene	Lane	January 10, 1996
689	Eugene	Lane	January 10, 1996
690	Medford	Jackson	March 3, 2008
691	Canyonville	Douglas	January 24, 2007
692	Malin	Klamath	September 3, 2008
693	Bend	Deschutes	July 22, 1999
694	Chemult	Klamath	September 3, 2008
695	Tygh Valley	Wasco	September 3, 2008
696	Camas Valley	Douglas	September 3, 2008
697	Huntington	Malheur	October 24, 2006
698	Gold Beach	Curry	January 17, 2002
699	Redmond	Deschutes	April 23, 2013
701	Hermiston	Umatilla	May 14, 2007
702	Medford	Jackson	February 23, 2006
703	Pilot Rock	Umatilla	September 3, 2008
704	Albany	Linn	October 31, 2000
705	The Dalles	Wasco	August 17, 2001
706	Bend	Deschutes	November 5, 2007
707	Reedsport	Douglas	August 1, 2002
708	Ashland	Jackson	September 25, 2006
709	Ontario	Malheur	September 16, 2004
710	Eugene	Lane	January 10, 1996
712	Bonanza	Klamath	September 3, 2008
713	Corvallis	Benton	January 10, 1996
714	Corvallis	Benton	January 10, 1996
715	Corvallis	Benton	January 10, 1996
716	Hood River	Hood River	August 17, 2001
717	Eugene	Lane	July 6, 1997
718	Eugene	Lane	January 10, 1996
719	Sisters	Deschutes	May 16, 2007
720	Hermiston	Umatilla	August 20, 2000
721	Monument	Grant	September 3, 2008
722	South Harney	Harney	September 3, 2008
723	Malin	Klamath	January 10, 1996
724	Adrian	Malheur	January 10, 1996
725	Mapleton	Lane	December 21, 2006
726	Springfield	Lane	January 10, 1996
727	Central Point	Jackson	August 8, 2006
728	Bend	Deschutes	April 30, 2007
729	Springfield	Lane	January 10, 1996
730	Albany	Linn	October 13, 1999
731	Springfield	Lane	June 13, 2000
732	Medford	Jackson	January 10, 1996
733	Roseburg	Douglas	May 18, 1998
734	Medford	Jackson	January 10, 1996
735	Springfield	Lane	August 22, 2013
736	Springfield	Lane	November 20, 1998
737	Corvallis	Benton	January 10, 1996
738	Corvallis	Benton	October 13, 1999
739	Wasco	Sherman	January 10, 1996
740	Corvallis	Benton	January 10, 1996
741	Springfield	Lane	January 10, 1996
742	Halfway	Baker	January 10, 1996
743	Springfield	Lane	June 13, 2000
744	Springfield	Lane	January 10, 1996
745	Corvallis	Benton	January 10, 1996
746	Springfield	Lane	January 10, 1996
747	Springfield	Lane	January 10, 1996
748	Paulina	Crook	September 3, 2008
749	Bend	Deschutes	March 3, 2001
750	Corvallis	Benton	January 10, 1996
751	North Bend	Coos	January 10, 1996
752	Corvallis	Benton	January 10, 1996
753	Corvallis	Benton	January 10, 1996
754	Corvallis	Benton	January 10, 1996
755	Granite	Baker	June 13, 2000
756	North Bend	Coos	January 10, 1996
757	Corvallis	Benton	January 10, 1996
758	Corvallis	Benton	January 10, 1996
759	Lakeside	Coos	January 10, 1996
760	Corvallis	Benton	May 18, 1998
761	Grants Pass	Josephine	October 13, 1999
762	Eugene	Lane	November 20, 1998
763	Fossil	Wheeler	January 10, 1996
764	Depoe Bay	Lincoln	January 10, 1996
765	Depoe Bay	Lincoln	January 10, 1996
766	Corvallis	Benton	January 10, 1996
767	Cottage Grove	Lane	July 1, 1996
768	Corvallis	Benton	June 13, 2000
769	The Dalles	Wasco	February 14, 2008
770	Medford	Jackson	January 10, 1996
771	Bend	Deschutes	July 22, 1999
772	Medford	Jackson	January 10, 1996
773	Medford	Jackson	January 10, 1996
774	Medford	Jackson	July 6, 1997
776	Medford	Jackson	January 10, 1996
777	Madras	Jefferson	January 14, 2000
778	Medford	Jackson	August 17, 2004
779	Medford	Jackson	January 10, 1996
780	Eugene	Lane	December 8, 2015
781	North Harney	Harney	September 3, 2008
782	Oakridge	Lane	January 10, 1996
783	Chiloquin	Klamath	January 10, 1996
784	Roseburg	Douglas	October 15, 1996
785	Oxbow	Baker	January 10, 1996
786	La Grande	Union	November 20, 1998
787	Grants Pass	Josephine	May 18, 1998
788	Bend	Deschutes	January 14, 2000
789	Medford	Jackson	September 28, 2004
790	Eugene	Lane	September 17, 2008
791	Albany	Linn	July 6, 1997
792	John Day	Grant	June 20, 2005
793	Diamond Lake	Douglas	January 10, 1996
794	North Powder	Union	September 4, 2008
795	Heppner	Morrow	September 4, 2008
796	Huntington	Malheur	September 4, 2008
797	Bend	Deschutes	November 6, 2014
798	Merrill	Klamath	January 10, 1996
799	Eugene	Lane	April 24, 2015
800	Stanfield	Umatilla	September 23, 2014
801	Baker City	Baker	August 29, 2014
802	Oakland	Douglas	September 20, 2012
803	Culver	Jefferson	March 13, 2007
804	Drain	Douglas	September 2, 2008
805	La Grande	Union	September 7, 2005
806	Hood River	Hood River	May 18, 1998
808	Coos Bay	Coos	April 15, 2008
809	Milton-Freewater	Umatilla	June 25, 2014
810	Klamath Falls	Klamath	May 18, 1998
812	Albany	Linn	January 11, 1997
813	Brookings	Curry	September 1, 2005
814	Medford	Jackson	January 10, 1996
815	Bend	Deschutes	November 20, 1998
816	Medford	Jackson	January 29, 2013
817	Roseburg	Douglas	October 16, 2002
818	Sweet Home	Linn	March 31, 2006
819	Newport	Lincoln	June 1, 2015
820	Prairie City	Grant	January 10, 1996
821	Medford	Jackson	January 10, 1996
822	Blue River	Lane	January 10, 1996
823	Ontario	Malheur	May 10, 1999
824	Coquille	Coos	April 2, 2007
825	Days Creek	Douglas	January 10, 1996
826	White City	Jackson	January 10, 1996
827	Chiloquin	Klamath	September 2, 2008
828	Flora-Troy	Wallowa	January 10, 1996
829	Corvallis	Benton	October 15, 1996
830	White City	Jackson	January 10, 1996
831	White City	Jackson	October 15, 1996
832	Glendale	Douglas	January 10, 1996
833	Veneta	Lane	September 25, 2006
834	Maupin	Wasco	September 3, 2008
835	Fort Klamath	Klamath	September 2, 2008
836	Drain	Douglas	January 10, 1996
837	Azalea	Douglas	January 10, 1996
838	Grants Pass	Josephine	April 9, 2015
839	Canyonville	Douglas	January 10, 1996
840	Medford	Jackson	January 10, 1996
841	Medford	Jackson	March 16, 2015
842	Medford	Jackson	October 31, 2000
843	Jacksonville	Jackson	February 6, 2014
844	Eugene	Lane	March 13, 2006
845	Merrill	Klamath	August 28, 2008
846	Grants Pass	Josephine	January 10, 1996
847	Monroe	Benton	January 10, 1996
848	Bend	Deschutes	January 25, 2006
849	Yoncalla	Douglas	January 10, 1996
850	Klamath Falls	Klamath	January 10, 1996
851	Klamath Falls	Klamath	January 11, 1997
852	Eugene	Lane	February 19, 2008
853	Medical Springs	Union	January 10, 1996
854	Blue River	Lane	March 13, 2007
855	Gold Hill	Jackson	January 10, 1996
856	Haines	Baker	January 10, 1996
857	Medford	Jackson	January 10, 1996
858	Medford	Jackson	January 10, 1996
859	Chiloquin	Klamath	August 28, 2008
860	Myrtle Creek	Douglas	November 20, 1998
861	Milton-Freewater	Umatilla	August 20, 2000
862	Grants Pass	Josephine	January 10, 1996
863	Myrtle Creek	Douglas	January 10, 1996
864	Medford	Jackson	May 18, 1998
865	Butte Falls	Jackson	January 10, 1996
866	Wolf Creek	Josephine	January 10, 1996
867	South Beach	Lincoln	January 10, 1996
868	Springfield	Lane	January 14, 2000
869	Huntington	Malheur	January 10, 1996
870	Eugene	Lane	October 13, 1999
871	Sprague River	Klamath	August 28, 2008
872	Glide	Douglas	August 28, 2008
873	Seneca	Grant	September 3, 2008
874	Riddle	Douglas	January 10, 1996
875	Chitwood	Lincoln	January 10, 1996
876	La Pine	Deschutes	September 25, 2006
877	Durkee	Baker	January 10, 1996
878	Shady Cove	Jackson	January 10, 1996
879	White City	Jackson	May 14, 2007
880	Klamath Falls	Klamath	July 6, 1997
881	Ontario	Malheur	January 10, 1996
882	Klamath Falls	Klamath	January 10, 1996
883	Klamath Falls	Klamath	January 10, 1996
884	Klamath Falls	Klamath	January 10, 1996
885	Klamath Falls	Klamath	January 10, 1996
886	Wallowa	Wallowa	January 10, 1996
887	Klamath Falls	Klamath	October 13, 2004
888	Coos Bay	Coos	January 10, 1996
889	Ontario	Malheur	January 10, 1996
890	Medford	Jackson	January 10, 1996
891	Klamath Falls	Klamath	January 10, 1996
892	Klamath Falls	Klamath	January 10, 1996
893	Richland	Baker	January 10, 1996
894	Sumpter	Baker	January 10, 1996
895	Creswell	Lane	January 10, 1996
896	Leaburg	Lane	January 10, 1996
897	Phoenix	Jackson	April 26, 2007
898	North Powder	Union	January 10, 1996
899	Jacksonville	Jackson	January 10, 1996
900	Roseburg	Douglas	March 13, 2015
901	Florence	Lane	August 27, 2013
902	Florence	Lane	January 10, 1996
903	Prineville	Crook	April 10, 2013
904	Sisters	Deschutes	December 3, 2013
905	Albany	Linn	October 13, 1999
906	Paisley	Lake	August 28, 2008
907	La Pine	Deschutes	December 3, 2013
908	Corvallis	Benton	July 1, 1996
909	North Umpqua	Douglas	August 28, 2008
910	La Grande	Union	August 14, 2008
912	Eugene	Lane	January 10, 1996
913	Eugene	Lane	January 10, 1996
914	Eugene	Lane	January 10, 1996
915	Eugene	Lane	January 10, 1996
916	Grants Pass	Josephine	December 16, 2015
917	Albany	Linn	January 10, 1996
918	Albany	Linn	March 3, 2001
919	Athena	Umatilla	January 27, 2014
920	Vale	Malheur	December 24, 2013
921	Lincoln City	Lincoln	January 10, 1996
922	Umatilla	Umatilla	January 10, 1996
923	Redmond	Deschutes	January 10, 1996
924	Albany	Linn	January 10, 1996
925	Horton	Lane	January 10, 1996
926	Albany	Linn	January 10, 1996
927	Triangle Lake	Lane	January 10, 1996
928	Albany	Linn	January 10, 1996
929	Philomath	Benton	January 10, 1996
930	Medford	Jackson	October 16, 2014
931	Gilchrist	Klamath	September 4, 2008
932	Mount Vernon	Grant	January 10, 1996
933	Marcola	Lane	January 10, 1996
934	Monument	Grant	January 10, 1996
935	Veneta	Lane	January 10, 1996
936	Albany	Linn	August 14, 1998
937	Lowell	Lane	January 10, 1996
938	Milton-Freewater	Umatilla	January 10, 1996
939	Long Creek	Grant	September 4, 2008
940	Heppner	Morrow	September 4, 2008
941	Medford	Jackson	January 10, 1996
942	Cottage Grove	Lane	January 10, 1996
943	Paisley	Lake	January 10, 1996
944	Medford	Jackson	January 10, 1996
945	Boardman	Morrow	September 4, 2008
946	Cottage Grove-Culp Creek	Lane	January 10, 1996
947	Lakeview	Lake	January 10, 1996
948	Bend	Deschutes	August 14, 1998
949	Fish Lake	Jackson	January 10, 1996
951	Medford	Jackson	October 13, 1999
952	Junction City	Lane	August 20, 2000
953	Eugene	Lane	January 10, 1996
954	Eugene	Lane	January 10, 1996
955	Grants Pass	Josephine	January 10, 1996
956	Grants Pass	Josephine	July 22, 1999
957	Roseburg	Douglas	January 10, 1996
960	Elgin	Union	May 30, 2007
961	Newport	Lincoln	January 10, 1996
962	La Grande	Union	January 10, 1996
963	La Grande	Union	January 10, 1996
964	Triangle Lake-Deadwood	Lane	January 10, 1996
965	The Dalles	Wasco	May 18, 1998
966	Pendleton	Umatilla	January 10, 1996
967	Albany	Linn	January 10, 1996
968	Eugene	Lane	October 11, 1997
969	Pendleton	Umatilla	January 10, 1996
970	Pendleton	Umatilla	May 18, 1998
971	Albany	Linn	August 14, 1998
972	Eugene	Lane	March 4, 2014
973	Medford	Jackson	May 18, 1998
974	Albany	Linn	July 1, 1996
975	La Grande	Union	January 10, 1996
976	(Eugene)		
977	Bend	Deschutes	May 18, 1998
978	The Dalles	Wasco	January 10, 1996
979	Albany	Linn	May 18, 1998
980	The Dalles	Wasco	May 18, 1998
981	Albany	Linn	January 10, 1996
982	Coos Bay	Coos	January 10, 1996
983	Meacham	Umatilla	October 15, 1996
984	Eugene	Lane	May 18, 1998
985	Tygh Valley	Wasco	September 4, 2008
987	Dayville	Grant	January 10, 1996
988	Springfield	Lane	January 10, 1996
989	Lexington	Morrow	January 10, 1996
990	Albany	Linn	January 10, 1996
991	Florence	Lane	January 10, 1996
992	Lincoln City	Lincoln	January 10, 1996
993	The Dalles	Wasco	January 10, 1996
994	Lincoln City	Lincoln	January 10, 1996
995	Harrisburg	Linn	January 10, 1996
996	Lincoln City	Lincoln	January 10, 1996
997	Florence	Lane	January 10, 1996
998	Junction City	Lane	January 10, 1996
999	Florence	Lane	January 10, 1996

Central office prefixes of area code 458
Prefix	Location	County	Introduced
200	Cascade Locks	Hood River	October 3, 2011
201	Eugene	Lane	March 28, 2012
202	Bend	Deschutes	September 11, 2012
203	Rogue River	Jackson	October 6, 2014
204	Toledo	Lincoln	March 17, 2016
205	Eugene	Lane	June 16, 2011
206	Bend	Deschutes	August 18, 2011
207	Veneta	Lane	April 29, 2014
209	Eugene	Lane	March 14, 2017
210	Eugene	Lane	October 6, 2014
212	Grants Pass	Josephine	October 6, 2014
213	Wallowa	Wallowa	July 6, 2016
214	Phoenix	Jackson	April 18, 2014
215	Eugene	Lane	October 16, 2014
216	Marcola	Lane	April 18, 2014
217	Junction City	Lane	November 30, 2015
218	Prineville	Crook	December 22, 2015
219	Hermiston	Umatilla	March 4, 2016
220	Central Point	Jackson	August 21, 2017
221	Eugene	Lane	March 13, 2017
223	Lebanon	Linn	October 26, 2017
224	Ontario	Malheur	June 15, 2016
225	Medford	Jackson	February 19, 2016
226	Medford	Jackson	April 11, 2017
227	Prospect	Jackson	March 18, 2016
228	Newport	Lincoln	September 21, 2018
229	Grants Pass	Josephine	July 29, 2016
230	Coos Bay	Coos	October 5, 2017
231	Culver	Jefferson	September 7, 2016
232	Klamath Falls	Klamath	October 19, 2017
233	Albany	Linn	October 26, 2017
234	Eugene	Lane	March 12, 2018
235	Boardman	Morrow	August 6, 2018
236	Wasco	Sherman	August 6, 2018
237	Hood River	Hood River	October 9, 2018
238	Bandon	Coos	December 4, 2018
239	Eugene	Lane	January 30, 2019
240	Eugene	Lane	September 18, 2019
241	Echo	Umatilla	October 24, 2019
242	Imbler	Union	October 24, 2019
243	Glendale	Douglas	October 24, 2019
244	Myrtle Creek	Douglas	October 24, 2019
245	Eugene	Lane	October 25, 2019
246	Hood River	Hood River	January 14, 2020
247	Eugene	Lane	January 17, 2020
248	Lowell	Lane	December 16, 2020
249	Chiloquin	Klamath	May 13, 2020
250	Eugene	Lane	July 10, 2020
251	Ontario	Malheur	January 27, 2020
252	Ontario	Malheur	September 10, 2020
253	Albany	Linn	September 16, 2020
254	Klamath Falls	Klamath	September 28, 2020
255	Hermiston	Umatilla	September 28, 2020
256	Bend	Deschutes	August 15, 2016
257	Grants Pass	Josephine	November 25, 2020
258	Rogue River	Jackson	April 6, 2020
259	Brownsville	Linn	February 1, 2021
260	Brookings	Curry	March 3, 2021
261	Eugene	Lane	March 3, 2021
262	Albany	Linn	March 18, 2021
263	Silver Lake	Lake	December 29, 2021
264	Junction City	Lane	April 22, 2021
265	White City	Jackson	April 29, 2021
266	Lebanon	Linn	May 27, 2021
267	Powers	Coos	June 23, 2021
268	Coquille	Coos	June 23, 2021
269	Halsey	Linn	June 23, 2021
270	Veneta	Lane	June 30, 2021
271	Roseburg	Douglas	June 30, 2021
272	Corvallis	Benton	August 20, 2021
273	Eugene	Lane	August 24, 2021
274	Central Point	Jackson	August 27, 2021
275	Creswell	Lane	November 2, 2021
276	Ontario	Malheur	September 13, 2021
277	Newport	Lincoln	November 9, 2021
278	Albany	Linn	November 9, 2021
279	Florence	Lane	November 15, 2021
280	Oakland	Douglas	November 23, 2021
281	Bend	Deschutes	December 14, 2021
282	Cottage Grove	Lane	December 14, 2021
283	Jacksonville	Jackson	December 15, 2021
284	Harrisburg	Linn	January 20, 2022
285	Albany	Linn	March 8, 2022
286	O'Brien	Josephine	February 22, 2022
287	Prineville	Crook	March 14, 2022
288	Gold Beach	Curry	March 21, 2022
292	Bend	Deschutes	February 4, 2016
300	Hermiston	Umatilla	October 25, 2018
301	Selma	Josephine	May 16, 2022
345	Enterprise	Wallowa	July 16, 2021
355	Bend	Deschutes	October 17, 2018
356	Eugene	Lane	July 28, 2020
400	Culver	Jefferson	October 25, 2018
433	Vale	Malheur	March 21, 2022
446	Ontario	Malheur	February 5, 2021
455	Coos Bay	Coos	September 13, 2021
457	Nyssa	Malheur	June 23, 2021
459	Blue River	Lane	May 30, 2019
463	Joseph	Wallowa	February 9, 2022
466	Bandon	Coos	February 25, 2022
488	Talent	Jackson	June 3, 2021
500	Sisters	Deschutes	August 28, 2018
505	Shady Cove	Jackson	July 6, 2015
529	Talent	Jackson	July 28, 2020
544	Eugene	Lane	September 13, 2021
546	Yachats	Lincoln	October 11, 2017
562	Waldport	Lincoln	October 11, 2017
588	The Dalles	Wasco	September 13, 2021
592	Cave Junction	Josephine	August 11, 2020
600	Bend	Deschutes	August 24, 2018
624	North Powder	Union	February 15, 2022
625	Bonanza	Klamath	March 2, 2022
632	Ione	Morrow	February 9, 2022
646	Cascade Locks	Hood River	February 1, 2022
658	Medford	Jackson	July 24, 2018
666	Bend	Deschutes	July 14, 2020
675	Oakridge	Lane	March 14, 2016
687	Moro	Sherman	February 15, 2022
703	Canyonville	Douglas	March 7, 2016
710	Coos Bay	Coos	October 9, 2019
723	Burns	Harney	February 1, 2022
726	Monument	Grant	February 15, 2022
742	Diamond	Harney	February 15, 2022
746	Grass Valley	Sherman	February 7, 2022
757	Milton-Freewater	Umatilla	July 13, 2016
763	Ashland	Jackson	February 23, 2022
777	Jefferson	Marion	September 7, 2017
783	Depoe Bay	Lincoln	February 23, 2022
787	Heppner	Morrow	February 7, 2022
800	Madras	Jefferson	August 28, 2018
802	Roseburg	Douglas	January 25, 2016
803	Roseburg	Douglas	April 2, 2019
832	Mount Hood-Parkdale	Hood River	February 18, 2022
836	Bend	Deschutes	February 9, 2021
837	Mitchell	Wheeler	February 14, 2022
846	Fields	Harney	February 18, 2022
854	The Dalles	Wasco	September 11, 2018
867	Eugene	Lane	November 19, 2021
868	South Beach	Lincoln	October 11, 2017
877	La Grande	Union	September 13, 2021
886	Beatty	Klamath	March 2, 2022
888	Athena	Umatilla	April 14, 2015
895	Eugene	Lane	October 23, 2020
899	Redmond	Deschutes	October 26, 2018
900	Athena	Umatilla	October 25, 2018
901	Coos Bay	Coos	November 16, 2021
902	Cove	Union	January 19, 2022
910	Eugene	Lane	April 16, 2021
946	Riddle	Douglas	July 28, 2020
976	(Eugene)		
987	Gilchrist	Klamath	February 4, 2022
999	Umatilla	Umatilla	September 7, 2017

== See also ==
- List of North American Numbering Plan area codes
- List of Oregon area codes

Oregon area codes: 503/971, 541/458
	North: 503/971, 509	
West: Pacific Ocean	541/458	East: 208/986
	South: 530, 707, 775	
California area codes: 209/350, 213/323, 310/424, 408/669, 415/628, 510/341, 530, 559, 562, 619/858, 626, 650, 661, 707/369, 714/657, 760/442, 805/820, 818/747, 831, 909/840, 916/279, 925, 949, 951
Idaho area codes: 208/986
Nevada area codes: 702/725, 775
Washington area codes: 206, 253, 360, 425, 509, 564
