= OC&E Woods Line State Trail =

State trail in Oregon, USA

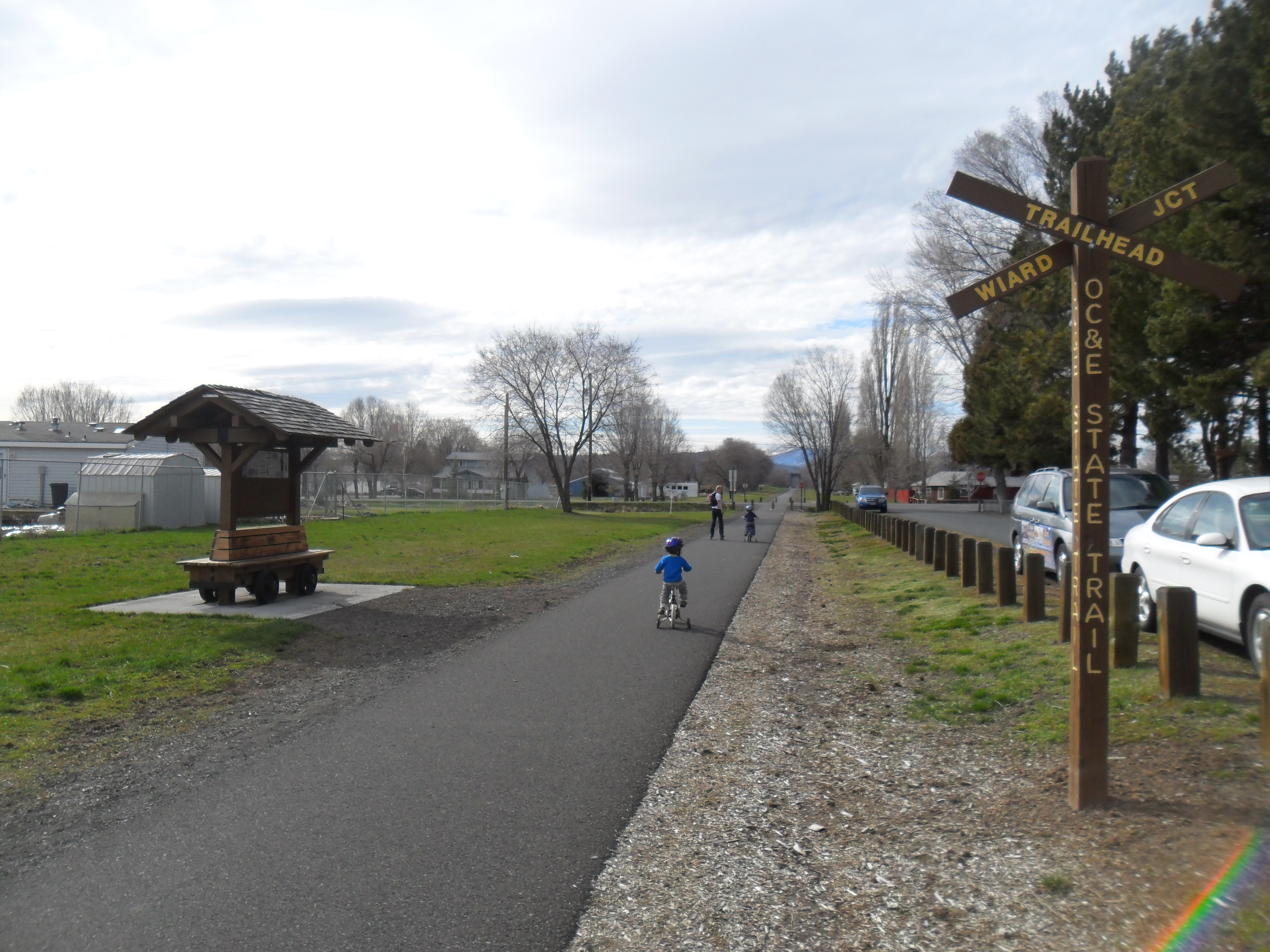
- OC&E Trail through Klamath Falls at Wiard Park

- Location within Oregon Location within the United States
- Type: Public, state
- Location: Klamath and Lake counties, Oregon
- Nearest city: Klamath Falls
- Coordinates: 42°12′27″N 121°45′07″W
- Operator: Oregon Parks and Recreation Department
- Open: Year-round
- Status: Day use, fee-free

The OC&E Woods Line State Trail is a rail trail in Klamath and Lake counties in the U.S. state of Oregon. It is Oregon's longest state park. The trail follows the old OC&E (Oregon, California and Eastern) and Weyerhaeuser railroads from Klamath Falls to Thompson Reservoir. Along its 105-mile (169 km) length it passes through the communities of Olene, Sprague River, Dairy, Beatty, and Bly.

The OC&E Woods Line State Trail is paved from Klamath Falls to the community of Olene, approximately 8 miles (13 km). Beyond Olene, the trail surface is graded and compacted, which attracts mountain bikers, hikers, anglers, equestrians, and wildlife watchers. Additionally, the trail has a gentle 2 percent slope grade.

== History ==
Construction on the OC&E Railroad (also known as the Klamath Municipal Railway) began in the summer of 1917 as part of a grand scheme to connect Central and Eastern Oregon with rail lines and take advantage of timber opportunities. Initial development efforts involved bonds sold by the city of Klamath Falls. Logging camps with spur railroads sprang up almost overnight, and by 1919, four lumber mills were located on the main line. After several delays, the OC&E was declared open in the fall of 1923, and in 1927 was extended to Bly.

Southern Pacific and Burlington Northern (and their pre-merger railroads) operated the line jointly from 1925 until 1974, when it was purchased by Weyerhaeuser, who solely operated the entire railroad in support of its timber operations. At peak production in the late 1970s, the OC&E was reported to be transporting 35,000 loads of wood products a year.

In the early 1980s, the OC&E had a decline in traffic, and when it was no longer cost effective to move logs by rail, Weyerhaeuser railbanked the line, and deeded it to the Oregon Parks and Recreation Department in 1992. The last logging train entered Klamath Falls on April 29, 1990.

== Uses ==
The OC&E Woods Line State Trail is a conversion of the OC&E Railroad disused railway easement into a non-motorized path used for walking, cycling, jogging and horse riding. The now paved flat trails stretch through agricultural and forest areas appealing for recreational development. The OC&E linear park is used by over 130,000 visitors every year. For example, from Olene, an unpaved section of the trail passes ranch lands, rivers and forests.

The trail provides connections to eight communities, five schools, and several suburban areas within Klamath Falls. Along each section, the trail passes through 13 interpretive signs highlighting historical interest points along the trails, recalling its old railroad years, including the historic 1898 steel bridge spanning the A Canal, all sites available for park visitors. Past the steel bridge sits a restored caboose, the last one used to run the rails to Klamath Falls.

Major trailheads are located along the trail identified by an OC&E State Trail railroad sign, including Crosby Street in Klamath Falls, Wiard Park, Oregon Route 39, Reeder Road, Switchbacks, Bly and Horse Glades. The A Canal trail runs from Esplanade Avenue to Homedale Road and intersects the OC&E trail near Summers Lane and Boardman Avenue. The northwest end of A Canal trail connects to the Oregon Department of Transportation's Kit Carson trail and starts near Portland Street and continues northwest to Oregon Institute of Technology and the city's only hospital, Sky Lakes Medical Center.

=== Trailhead activities ===
Trailhead	coordinate
Klamath Falls	42.20749°N 121.75190°W
Olene	42.17136°N 121.62996°W
Dairy	42.23462°N 121.52218°W
Sprague River	42.45715°N 121.50501°W
Sycan Siding	42.44867°N 121.24804°W
Bly	42.39523°N 121.03739°W
Sycan Marsh	42.78002°N 121.11442°W

The trail from Klamath Falls to Olene is paved, crosses the A Canal bike path and over the Canal through the 1898 steel railroad bridge shortly after running along Wiard Park. From Olene to Dairy the trail runs by the scenic Lost River, ranchlands, Sweede's Cut and Dairy Y Siding. From Dairy to the Sprague River, it becomes a gravel trail through the Winema National Forest, Devils Garden and Double Switchbacks built around the hills, which have camping areas, shortly before Bliss Road meets the Sprague River Highway. From Sprague River to Beatty the trail gives chance for fishing off the Sprague River, as well as Wildlife viewing and the Buttes of the Gods next to Bly Mountain. The same activities are presented from Beatty to Bly along several trestles and the cutoff of the Woods Line Trail.

=== Woods trail ===
The Woods Line is a trail that branches off the OC&E State Trail near Beatty outside of Klamath Falls and heads northward. The trail crosses over the Sprague River and next to the Sycan Shops. The trail meets Five Mile Creek after 10 miles (16 km) and runs along as its companion for 6 miles (10 km), crossing over it several times. The Horse Glades trail takes off after mile 19 of the Woods Line, an area provided with restrooms and camping areas. The Woods Line featured the Merritt Creek Trestle, running 400 feet (120 m) long and 50 feet (15 m) high before the trestle burned in the 2021 Bootleg Fire; some of the supports are still visible. The Woods Trail ends 7 miles (11 km) north of the trestle site at a point called Sycan Marsh at the north end of Ferguson Mountain, an attraction for birdwatchers. Ivory Pine Road runs from Oregon Route 140 up to the Horse Glades trail.

== See also ==
- List of rail trails
- List of Oregon state parks
- List of parks in Klamath Falls, Oregon
