= Bootleg Fire =

2021 wildfire in the U.S. state of Oregon

- Part of the 2021 Oregon wildfires
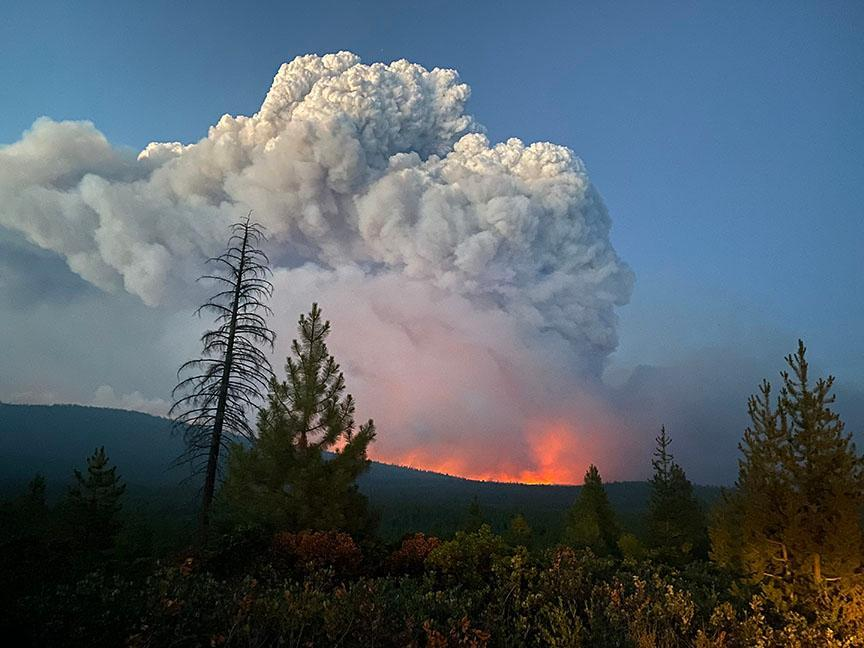
- The Bootleg Fire burning on July 8, 2021
- Date: July 6, 2021 – August 15, 2021
- Location: Beatty, Oregon, United States
- Coordinates: 42.616°N 121.421°W

Statistics
- Burned area: 413,765 acres 647 square miles1,674 square kilometres167,445 hectares

Impacts
- Structures lost: 408

Ignition
- Cause: Lightning

Map
- Location in Southern Oregon

The Bootleg Fire, named after the nearby Bootleg Spring, was a large wildfire that started near Beatty, Oregon, on July 6, 2021. Before being fully contained on August 15, 2021, it had burned 413,765 acres (167,445 ha; 1,674 km^{2}; 647 sq mi). It is the third-largest fire in the history of Oregon since 1900. At the fire's fastest growth in mid July, it grew at about 1,000 acres (400 ha) per hour, and it became the second largest wildfire in the United States of the 2021 wildfire season.

== Events ==
=== July ===
The Bootleg Fire was first reported on July 6, 2021, at around 1:42 pm PDT near Beatty, Oregon. The Bootleg Fire merged with the smaller Log Fire to the east on July 19, 2021.

As the Bootleg Fire burned east, it approached Mitchell Monument, a memorial to the only civilians killed in the 48 U.S. states during World War II. To protect the historic site, fire crews trimmed low-hanging tree branches and built a fire line around the monument site. They also wrapped the tree scarred by the Japanese balloon bomb explosion and the stone monument in a fire-resistant material similar to the material used for firefighters' emergency shelters. As a result, when the fire passed through the adjacent forest, the monument was undamaged.

=== Cause ===
Lightning was the cause of the fire.

=== Containment ===
The fire was 100% contained on August 15, 2021. At one point, over 2,200 personnel were fighting the fire.

== Impact ==
=== Closures and evacuations ===
Several hundred square miles of southern Oregon, in Klamath and Lake counties, were under evacuation orders of various degrees of severity.

=== Damage ===
A total of 408 buildings were destroyed by the fire, including 161 houses and 247 outbuildings. The fire also destroyed 342 vehicles. The historic Merritt Creek trestle along the OC&E Woods Line State Trail was also destroyed. Most of the burned forestland was owned by Green Diamond Resource Company, who had used the trees for carbon offsets. An estimated 4.2 million new seedlings are planned to be planted in the burn zone to offset the loss of the original trees.

=== Weather ===
The fire contributed to haze across the United States and vivid red sunrises and sunsets as far away as Boston and New York City. Heat and smoke from the Bootleg Fire generated pyrocumulus and pyrocumulonimbus clouds, some reaching as high as 45,000 feet (14,000 m) and bringing lightning strikes and precipitation. There were reports of small fire whirls, and officials believed that at least one actual fire tornado formed in the southeastern portion of the fire on July 18.

== See also ==
- 2021 Oregon wildfires
