= Klamath County School District =

School district in Oregon, United States

The Klamath County School District is a public school district serving Klamath County, Oregon, United States.

It covers the majority of the county. Communities in the district include Bly, Bonanza, Chiloquin, Gilchrist, Keno, Malin, and Merrill. It also covers small portions of Klamath Falls and the majority of Altamont.

As of June 2008, the school district had 6,657 students enrolled. It is the state's largest school district geographically.

The board of trustees appoints a superintendent who is in charge of the day-to-day operations of the school district. As of 2008, the superintendent is Glen Szymoniak. A five-member elected board oversees district operations.

== Demographics ==
In the 2009 school year, the district had 318 students classified as homeless by the Department of Education, comprising 5.2% of students in the district.

== Schools ==
The district has 13 elementary schools, a special education school, two middle schools, and six comprehensive high schools.

=== Bonanza Jr./Sr. High School ===
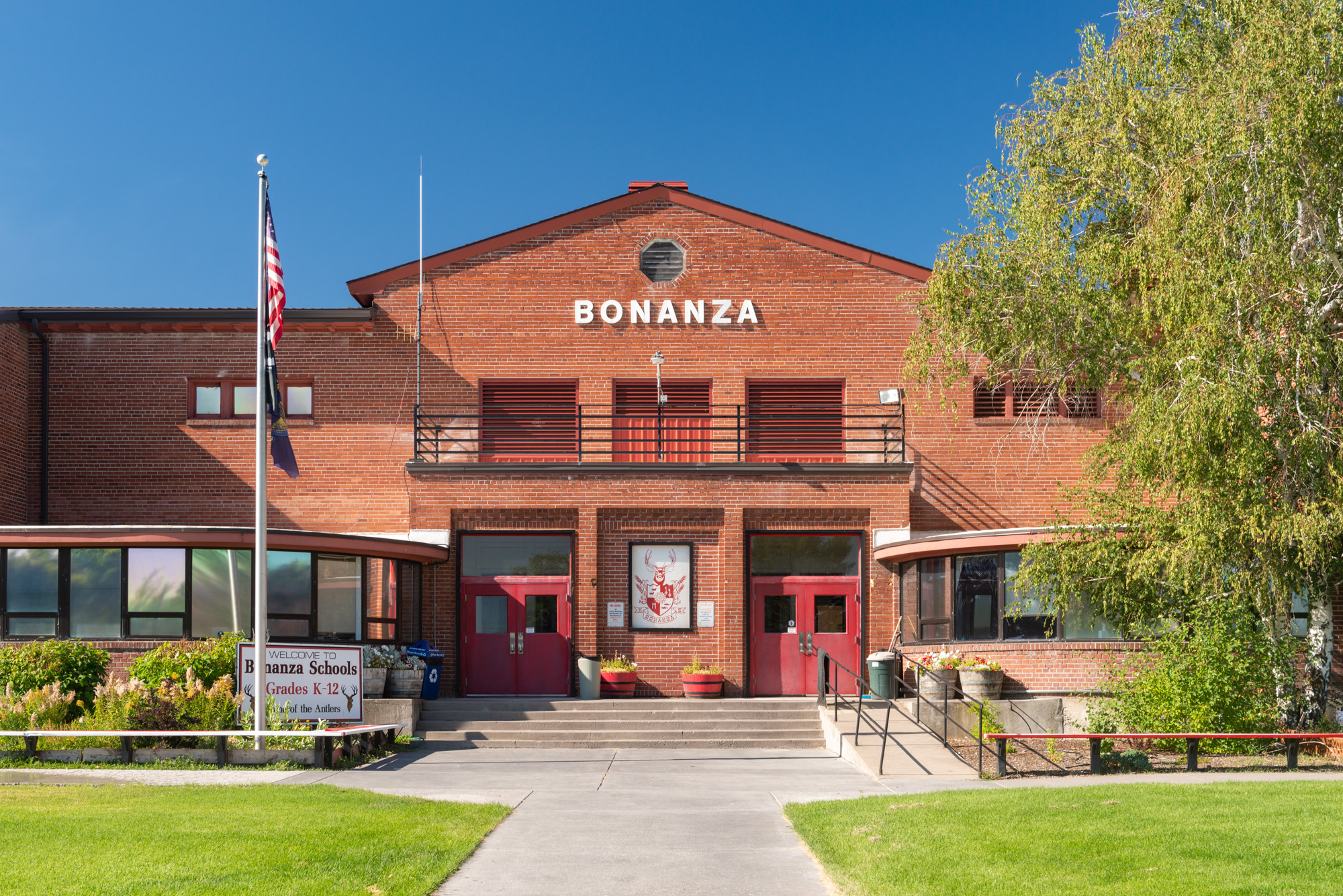
Bonanza Jr./Sr. High School

Bonanza Jr./Sr. High School serves grades 7–12 in the city of Bonanza, as well as the outlying communities of Sprague River, Dairy, Bly, Beatty, and Langell Valley, the Yonna and Poe valley areas, and the surrounding region. The school's bus drivers drive 520 miles (840 km) a day, because the school's attendance area covers nearly 950 square miles (2,500 km^{2}), with students living as far as 55 miles (89 km) from the school and having to travel on the school bus up to three hours a day. The school had 256 students in 2023–2024.

The school building also houses Bonanza Elementary School, serving K through 6th grade. Collectively the school is called Bonanza School, and the high school portion is known as Bonanza High School.

Construction of the current school building began in 1944, after a fire destroyed the previous school in 1943. The center and right wings of the school were set to be completed in early 1945, and the remaining wing was to be completed when more funds became available.

The school's mascot is the Antlers and the team colors are scarlet, black, and white. The school belongs to the Oregon School Activities Association and participates in the Mountain View Conference. Sports teams play in Class 2A-3, based on school enrollment.

=== Chiloquin High School ===
Chiloquin High School serves grades 7–12. In 2008, 87% of the school's seniors received a high school diploma. Of 39 students, 34 graduated, four dropped out, and one was still in high school the following year.

Chiloquin's high school athletic program began around the same time as the school itself. The school's mascot is the Panther and the team colors are black and Columbia blue, somewhat identical to the NFL's Carolina Panthers, minus the silver. The girls adopted the team name of the "Queens". The school is a member in good standing of the Oregon School Activities Association and participates in the Southern Cascade League. All teams currently play in Class 1A based on school enrollment.

The school had 177 students in 2023–2024.

The mascot is Panther/Queen and the school colors are Columbia Blue, White, and Black.

=== Gilchrist Junior/Senior High School ===
Gilchrist Junior/Senior High School serves grades 7-12. In 2008, 81% of the school's seniors received a high school diploma. Of 26 students, 21 graduated, three dropped out, and two were still in high school the following year.

The school had 109 students in 2023–2024.

The mascot is a Grizzly, and the school colors are green, gold, and white.

=== Henley High School ===
Henley High School serves grades 9–12.

The school has 697 students in 2023–2024.

In 2017, 98% of the school's seniors received their high school diploma. Of 144 students, 142 graduated, and two dropped out.

The mascot is a hornet, and the school colors are blue and gold.

=== Lost River Jr./Sr. High School ===
Lost River Jr./Sr. High School serves grades 7–12. It is named after the Lost River in Southern Oregon and Northern California.

There were 240 students in 2023–2024.

The mascot is known as the "Raider" and the team colors are black and gold. Lost River's high school athletic program began around the same time as the school itself. The school is a member in good standing of the Oregon School Activities Association and participate in the Southern Cascade League. All teams currently play in Class 2A, based on school enrollment.

=== Mazama High School ===
Mazama High School serves grades 9–12.

There were 692 students in 2023–2024.

The mascot is the Viking, and the school colors are blue, white, and gray.

=== Middle schools ===
KCSD has 2 two-year middle schools: Brixner and Henley.

=== Elementary schools ===
KCSD has thirteen elementary schools: Bonanza, Chiloquin, Ferguson, Gearhart, Gilchrist, Henley, Keno, Malin, Merill, Peterson, Shasta, Stearns.

=== Alternative schools ===
- Falcon Heights Alternative School (grades 9–12)

== See also ==
- Klamath Falls City School District
- List of school districts in Oregon
