= Bly Ranger Station =

- U.S. National Register of Historic Places
- U.S. Historic district
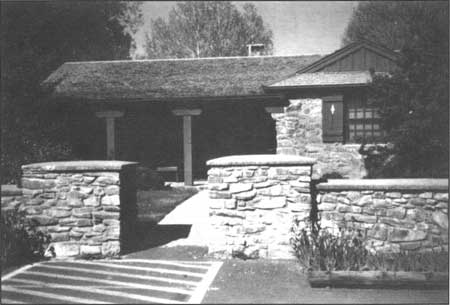

- Location within Oregon Location within the United States
- Location: Bly, Oregon, USA
- Coordinates: 42.400429°N 121.046099°W
- Built: 1936 - 1942
- Architect: E. U. Blanchfield
- Architectural style: Cascadian rustic
- NRHP reference No.: 81000650
- Added to NRHP: 1981

The Bly Ranger Station is a United States Forest Service compound that serves as the headquarters for the Bly Ranger District which is an administrative subdivision of the Fremont National Forest. It is located in the small unincorporated community of Bly in southcentral Oregon. The ranger station was constructed by the Civilian Conservation Corps between 1936 and 1942. Today, the seven original buildings are still used by the Bly Ranger District. The compound was listed on the National Register of Historic Places as a historic district in 1981.

== History ==
In the early 20th century, the forest road networks were not well developed. To facilitate work in National Forests, the Forest Service built district ranger stations at strategic locations within the forest to house full-time employees and provide logistics support to fire patrols and project crews working at remote forest sites. After World War II, the Forest Service greatly expanded its road network, allowing employees to get to most forest areas within a few hours. As a result, many of the more isolated ranger stations were closed or converted to summer guard station. However, the Bly Ranger Station has served continuously as a district administrative headquarters since it was built.

Development of the Bly Ranger Station began in 1935 when the Forest Service acquired a 4-acre (16,000 m^{2}) site in Bly for a district ranger station to manage the western part of the Fremont National Forest. The Forest Service paid $625 for the property. The ranger station was built by Civilian Conservation Corps workers stationed at nearby Camp Bly with the help of some experienced local men, all under the supervision of Forest Service district ranger Perry Smith. Construction was based on designs by E.U. Blanchfield, architect for the Forest Service's Pacific Northwest Region. The seven original buildings at the Bly compound were constructed between 1936 and 1942. A modern administrative headquarters building was added to the compound in the 1960s.

The original structures built by the Civilian Conservation Corps still exist and are all in excellent condition. Because of Bly Ranger Station's unique historic value as an early Forest Service ranger station, the compound and surrounding area was listed on the National Register of Historic Place on 11 March 1981. The entire site totals 47 acres (190,000 m^{2}).

== Structures ==
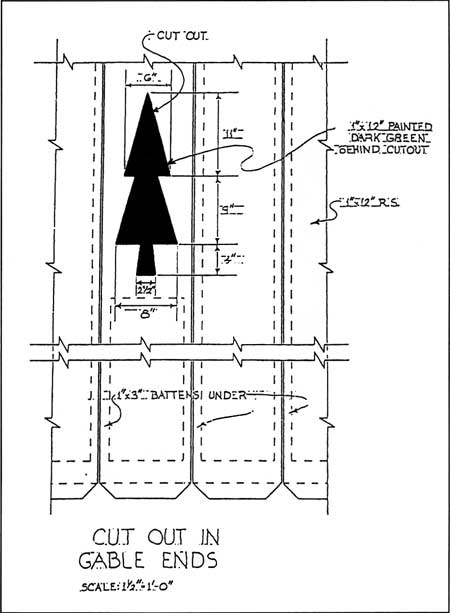
Forest Service open pine tree logo design

The historic buildings include a district administrative office, two ranger residences, a guard residence, a warehouse, a garage, and an oil and gas house. The buildings were constructed in the Cascadian rustic architectural style using native stone and locally cut pine lumber. Wooden shingles were used for roofing. The shutters and gables have the open pine tree logo common to Forest Service structures built during the 1930s. The Civilian Conservation Corps also built a 400-foot (120 m) stone wall in front of the compound to separate the site from the parking areas long the highway.

While the Bly Ranger Station buildings are masterpieces of Cascadian architecture, they were not expensive to build. The district office and the main ranger's residence were both finished in 1937. The office cost $1,700 to build while the ranger's residence cost the Government $2,400. The oil and gas house was built in 1939 at a cost of only $300. The last building constructed at Bly compound by the Civilian Conservation Corps was the guard residence. It was completed in 1942 at a cost of $1,600.

Over the years, the district staff has grown to more than thirty full-time employees, increasing the need for office space. In addition to the original district office and the new administrative building, the guard residence and the garage have been converted into office space. However, district personnel still live in the two ranger residences. The warehouse and gas house are still used for their original purposes as well.

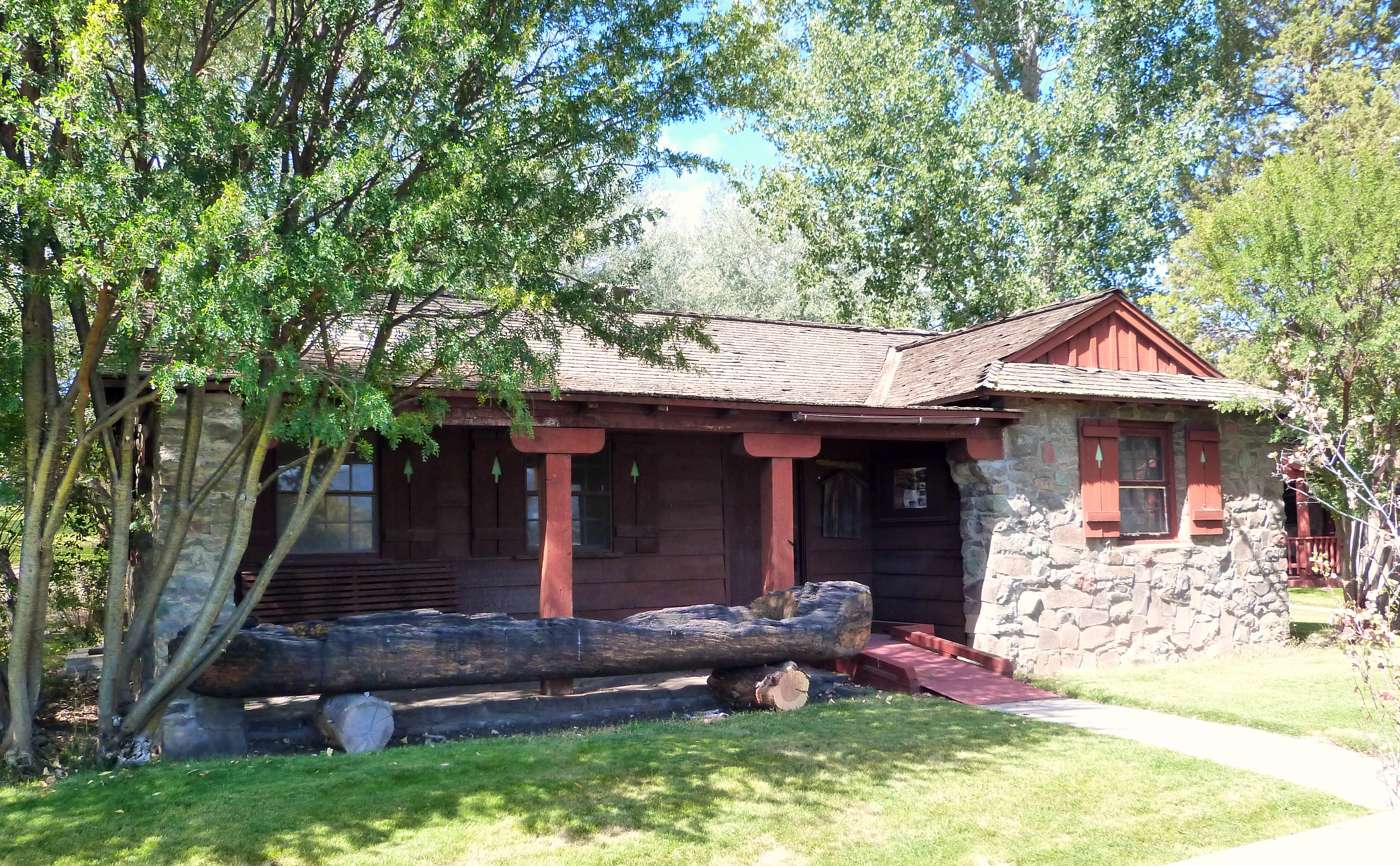
*District office

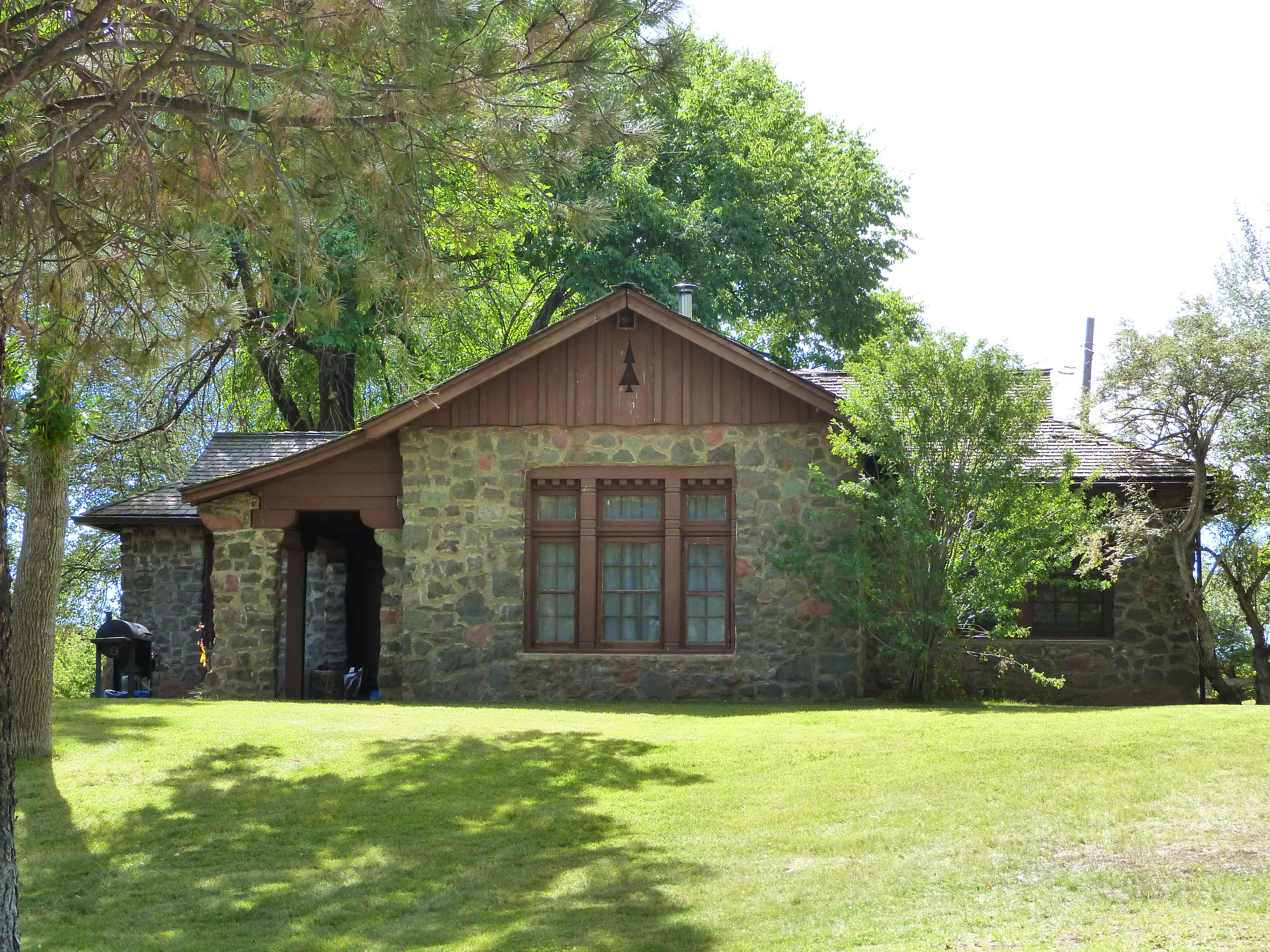
*Ranger's house

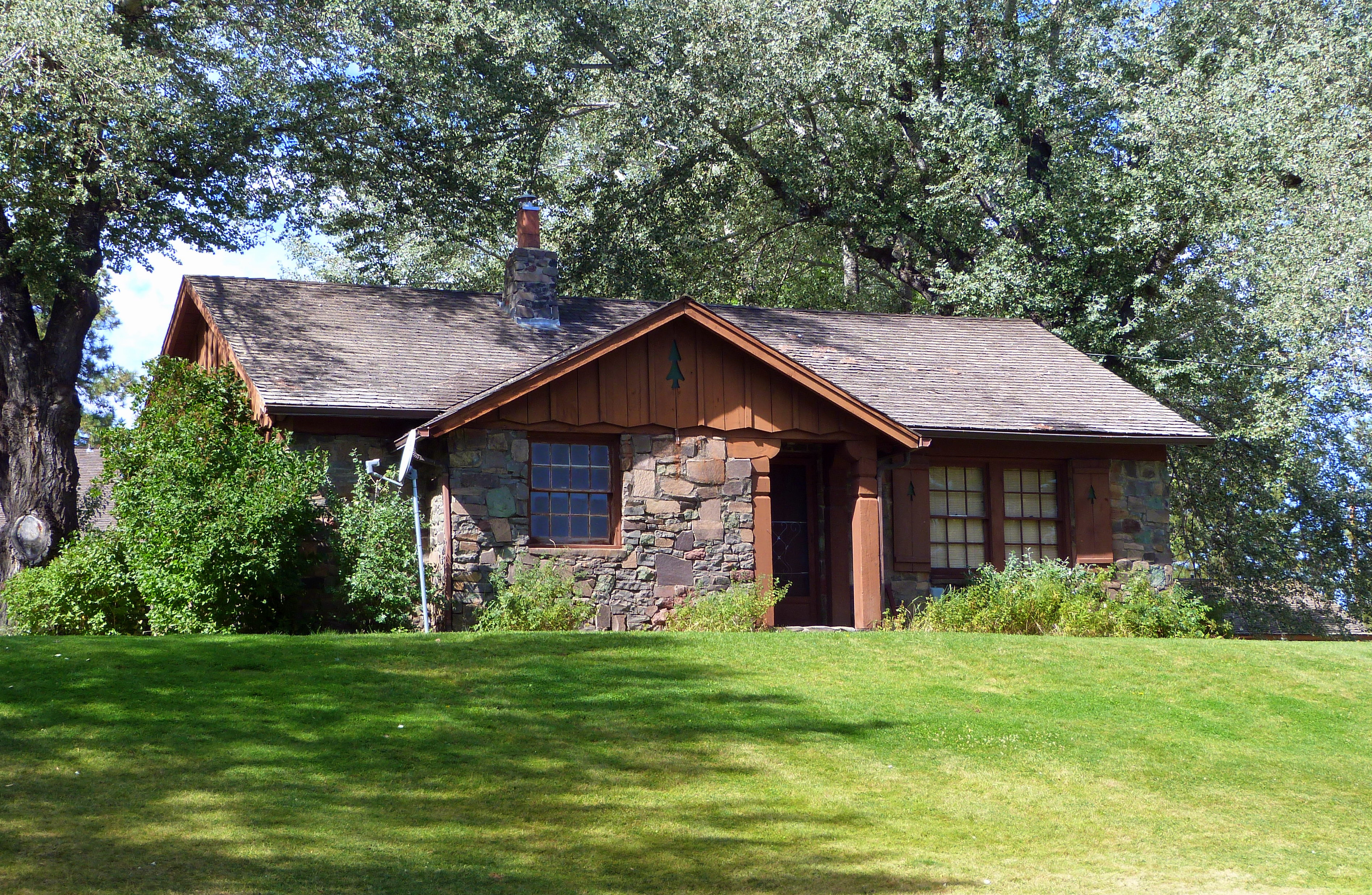
*Guard residence

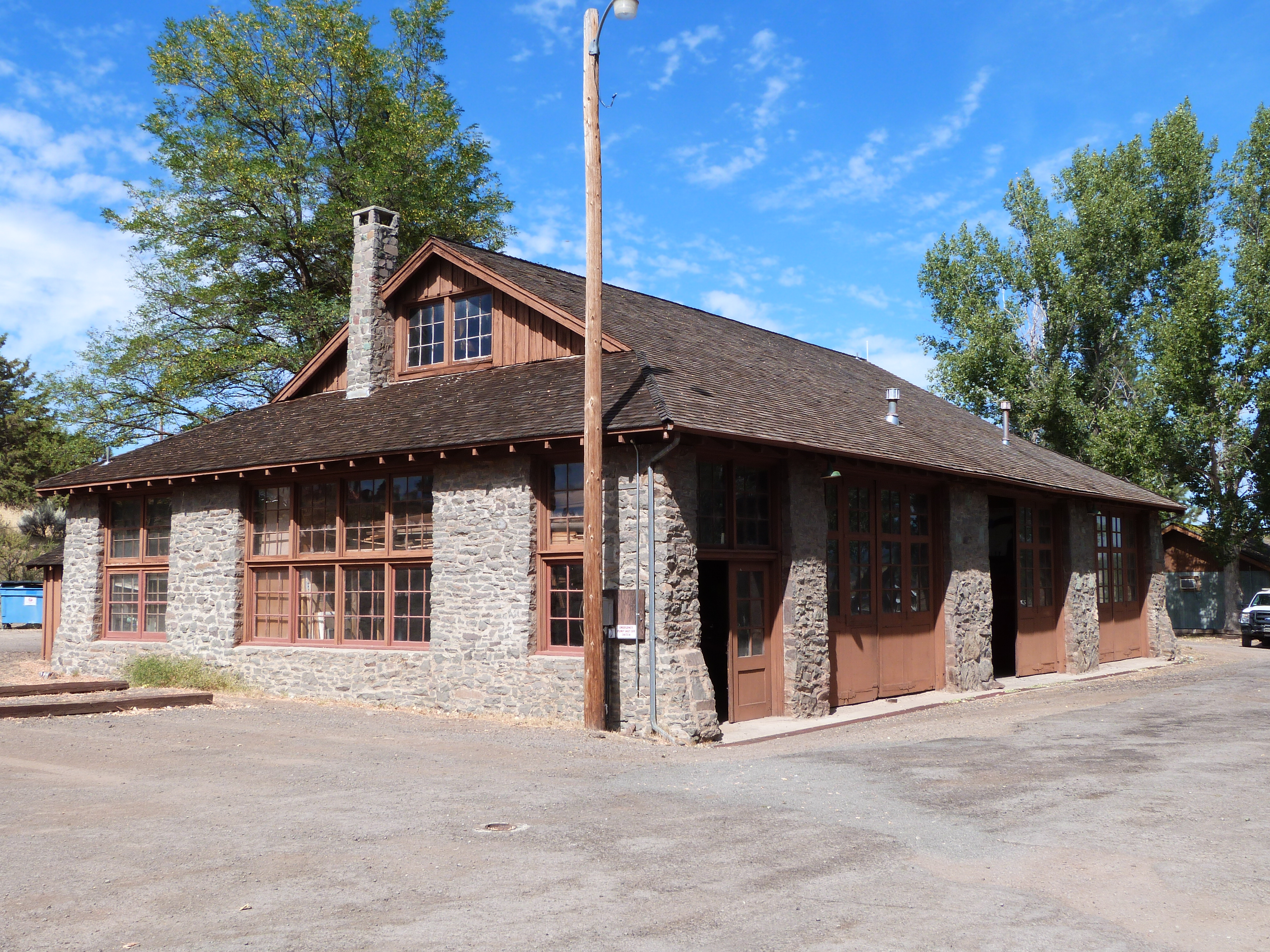
*Warehouse

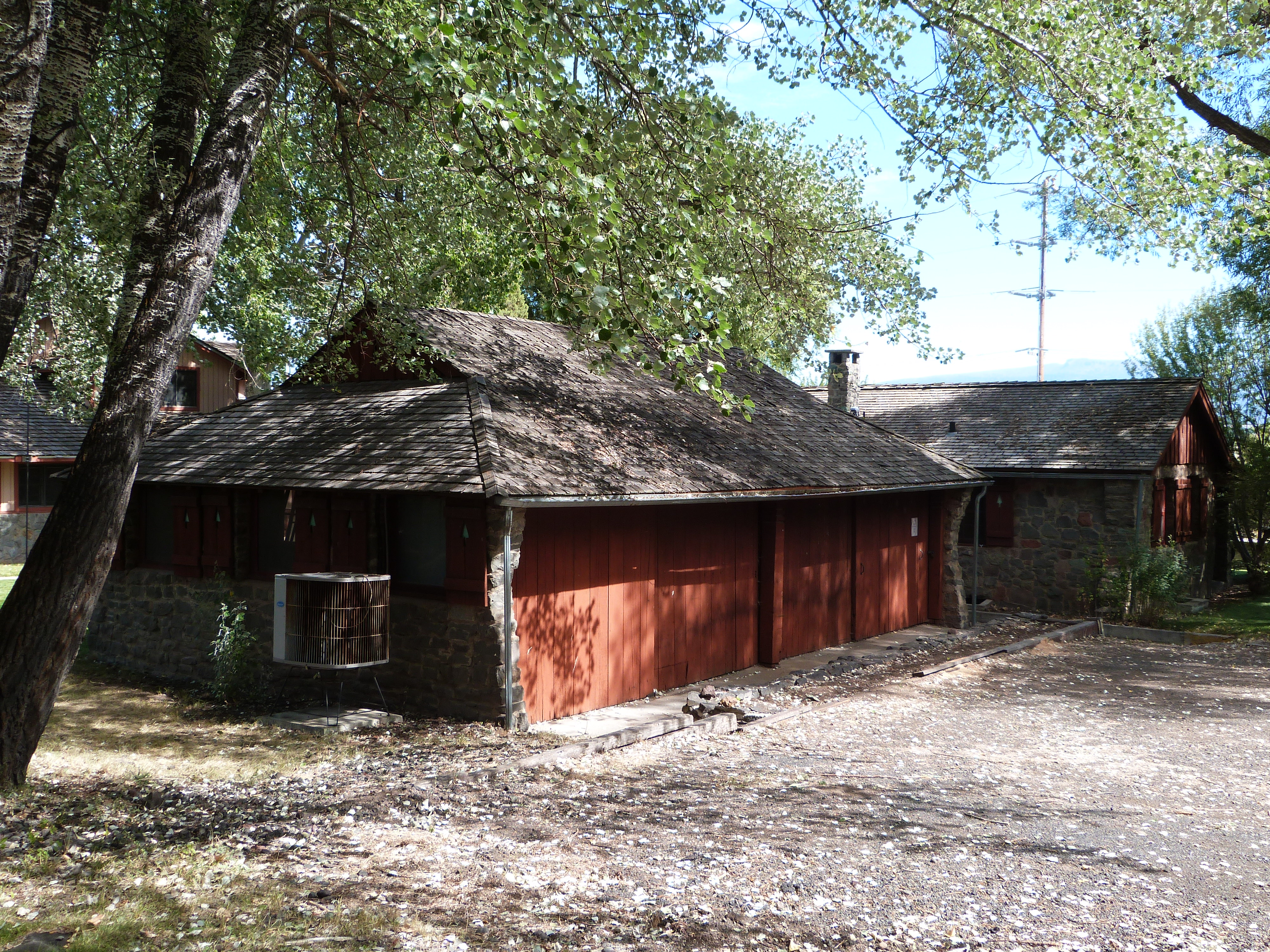
*Garage

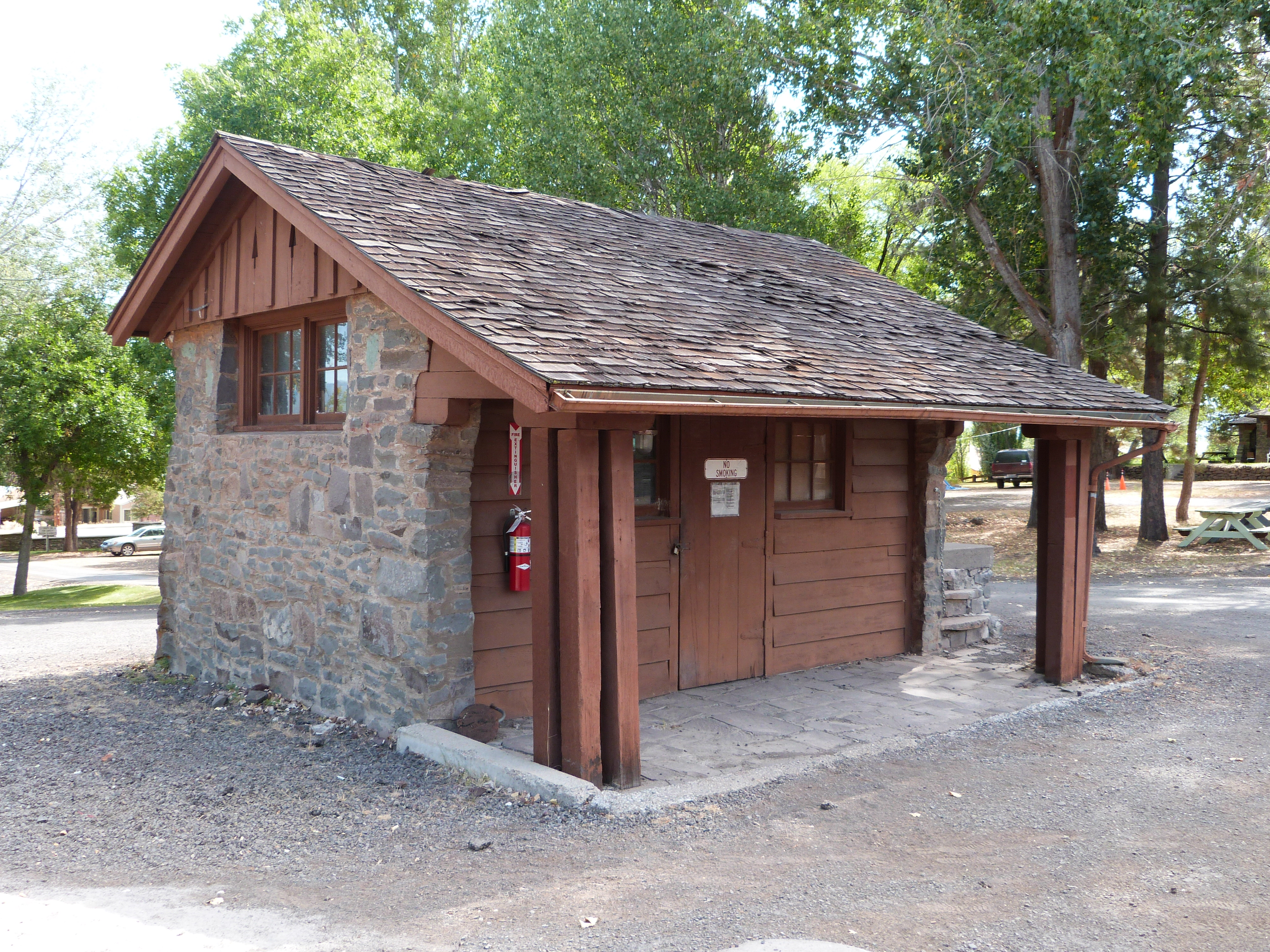
*Gas house

== Location ==
The Bly Ranger Station is located in the upper Sprague River Valley of eastern Klamath County, Oregon surrounded by the Fremont National Forest. The compound is on the south side of State Highway 140 in the small unincorporated community of Bly. The ranger station is 43 miles (69 km) northwest of Lakeview and 53 miles (85 km) northeast of Klamath Falls.

The Bly ranger station compound is open for self-guided tours Monday through Friday year around, except on Federal holidays. Information about the historic buildings is available at the district office. There are also picnic tables and public restrooms available at the site.

Mitchell Monument is approximately ten miles northwest of the ranger station in the Fremont National Forest. The monument is located at the only site in the continental United States where Americans were killed during World War II as a direct result of enemy action. Information about Mitchell Monument and its history is available at the ranger station.
