= Sprague River, Oregon =

Unincorporated community in the state of Oregon, United States

- Unincorporated community
- Location within Oregon and the United States Sprague River (the United States)
- Coordinates: 42°27′21″N 121°30′01″W
- Country: United States
- State: Oregon
- County: Klamath

Area
  - Total: 0.47 sq mi (1.21 km^{2})
  - Land: 0.47 sq mi (1.21 km^{2})
  - Water: 0 sq mi (0.00 km^{2})
- Elevation: 4,344 ft (1,324 m)

Population (2020)
  - Total: 80
  - Density: 171.1/sq mi (66.05/km^{2})
- Time zone: UTC-8 (Pacific (PST))
  - Summer (DST): UTC-7 (PDT)
- ZIP code: 97639
- Area code: 541
- FIPS code: 41-69400
- GNIS feature ID: 2805462

Sprague River is an unincorporated community in Klamath County, Oregon, United States. The community is about 45 miles (72 km) northeast of Klamath Falls near the Sprague River, northwest of Oregon Route 140.

As of the 2020 census, Sprague River had a population of 80.

== History ==
The Sprague River was named for Captain Franklin B. Sprague, who participated in the Snake and Paiute Indian wars, and was in command of Fort Klamath in 1866. His name was applied to the river by 1864, and perhaps earlier. The Klamath name for the stream was Plai or Plaikni Koke. Koke was the generic word for "river" and plai meant the river came from upper or higher country. Sprague River post office, named after the stream, was established September 14, 1923, with Benjamin E. Wolford as the first postmaster. There was an earlier post office named Sprague River farther east and upstream of the current community, at the site of the current town of Bly, Oregon

Sprague River had a station on the Oregon, California and Eastern Railway, which by 1927 reached from Klamath Falls to Bly. A 1941 timetable lists Sprague River as the 12th stop east of Klamath Falls between East Switch Back and Beatty. After 1990, the rail line near Sprague River became part of a rail trail, the OC&E Woods Line State Trail, managed by the Oregon Parks and Recreation Department.

At one time there was a sawmill in Sprague River, which shut down in 1943. There was also a box factory.

== Climate ==
Sprague River has a warm-summer Mediterranean climate (Csb) according to the Köppen climate classification system.

Climate data for Sprague
| Month | Jan | Feb | Mar | Apr | May | Jun | Jul | Aug | Sep | Oct | Nov | Dec | Year |
|---|---|---|---|---|---|---|---|---|---|---|---|---|---|
| Record high °F (°C) | 59 (15) | 67 (19) | 80 (27) | 83 (28) | 94 (34) | 99 (37) | 102 (39) | 104 (40) | 101 (38) | 90 (32) | 72 (22) | 65 (18) | 104 (40) |
| Mean daily maximum °F (°C) | 39.1 (3.9) | 44.4 (6.9) | 49.6 (9.8) | 57.6 (14.2) | 66.8 (19.3) | 75.1 (23.9) | 84.5 (29.2) | 83.8 (28.8) | 76.8 (24.9) | 65 (18) | 48.1 (8.9) | 39.7 (4.3) | 60.9 (16.1) |
| Mean daily minimum °F (°C) | 16.7 (−8.5) | 20.4 (−6.4) | 23.4 (−4.8) | 26 (−3) | 31.8 (−0.1) | 37.5 (3.1) | 41.5 (5.3) | 39.7 (4.3) | 32.4 (0.2) | 25.9 (−3.4) | 22.9 (−5.1) | 17.4 (−8.1) | 28 (−2) |
| Record low °F (°C) | −27 (−33) | −24 (−31) | −13 (−25) | 7 (−14) | 12 (−11) | 12 (−11) | 20 (−7) | 18 (−8) | 10 (−12) | 4 (−16) | −23 (−31) | −32 (−36) | −32 (−36) |
| Average precipitation inches (mm) | 2.55 (65) | 1.72 (44) | 1.69 (43) | 1 (25) | 1.14 (29) | 0.86 (22) | 0.41 (10) | 0.56 (14) | 0.66 (17) | 1.17 (30) | 2.24 (57) | 2.5 (64) | 16.49 (419) |
| Average snowfall inches (cm) | 10.2 (26) | 6.9 (18) | 5.3 (13) | 1.5 (3.8) | 0.3 (0.76) | 0 (0) | 0 (0) | 0 (0) | 0 (0) | 0.3 (0.76) | 5.4 (14) | 9.9 (25) | 39.9 (101) |
| Average precipitation days | 10 | 9 | 9 | 7 | 6 | 5 | 2 | 3 | 3 | 5 | 10 | 10 | 79 |

== Demographics ==
Historical population
| Census | Pop. | Note | %± |
|---|---|---|---|
| 2020 | 80 | | — |
U.S. Decennial Census

== Education ==
It is within the Klamath County School District.

It is in the territory of Klamath Community College.
