= Pine Grove, Wasco County, Oregon =

Unincorporated community in the state of Oregon, United States

Pine Grove
- Census-designated place (CDP)
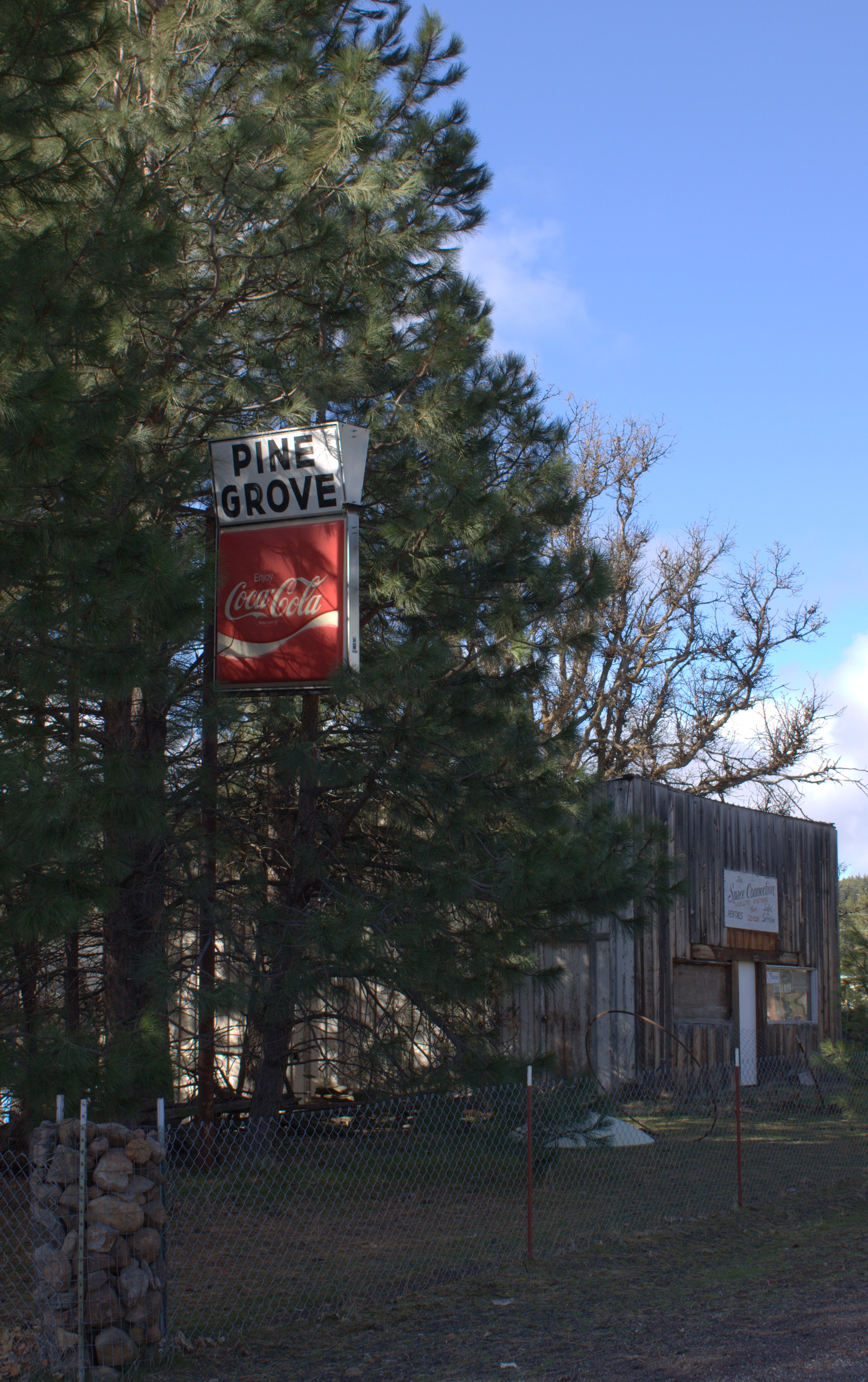
- Pine Grove sign

- Location within the state of Oregon
- Coordinates: 45°06′42″N 121°21′45″W
- Country: United States
- State: Oregon
- County: Wasco

Area
  - Total: 6.0 sq mi (16 km^{2})
- Elevation: 2,195 ft (669 m)

Population (2000)
  - Total: 162
  - Density: 27/sq mi (10/km^{2})
- Time zone: UTC-8 (Pacific (PST))
  - Summer (DST): UTC-7 (PDT)
- ZIP code: 97037
- Area codes: 458 and 541
- GNIS feature ID: 2409066

Pine Grove is a census-designated place (CDP) and unincorporated community in Wasco County, Oregon, United States. The population was 162 at the 2000 census.

== Geography ==
According to the United States Census Bureau, the CDP has a total area of 6.0 square miles (15.6 km^{2}), all of it land.

== Demographics ==
As of the census of 2000, there were 162 people, 77 households, and 48 families residing in the CDP. The population density was 26.9 inhabitants per square mile (10.4/km^{2}). There were 110 housing units at an average density of 18.2 per square mile (7.0/km^{2}). The racial makeup of the CDP was 96.30% White, 0.62% Native American, 0.00% from other races, and 3.09% from two or more races. Hispanic or Latino of any race were 0.62% of the population.

There were 77 households, out of which 15.6% had children under the age of 18 living with them, 48.1% were married couples living together, 6.5% had a female householder with no husband present, and 36.4% were non-families. 33.8% of all households were made up of individuals, and 10.4% had someone living alone who was 65 years of age or older. The average household size was 2.10 and the average family size was 2.63.

In the CDP, the population was spread out, with 17.9% under the age of 18, 4.9% from 18 to 24, 23.5% from 25 to 44, 31.5% from 45 to 64, and 22.2% who were 65 years of age or older. The median age was 48 years. For every 100 females, there were 105.1 males. For every 100 females age 18 and over, there were 114.5 males.

The median income for a household in the CDP was $22,917, and the median income for a family was $24,464. Males had a median income of $31,250 versus $21,250 for females. The per capita income for the CDP was $12,526. 23.0% of the population and 20.8% of families were below the poverty line. Out of the total people living in poverty, 20.0% are under the age of 18 and 16.7% are 65 or older.
