= Beatty, Oregon =

Unincorporated community in the state of Oregon, United States

- Census-designated place
- Location within Oregon and the United States Beatty (the United States)
- Coordinates: 42°26′31″N 121°16′18″W
- Country: United States
- State: Oregon
- County: Klamath

Area
  - Total: 0.97 sq mi (2.52 km^{2})
  - Land: 0.97 sq mi (2.52 km^{2})
  - Water: 0 sq mi (0.00 km^{2})
- Elevation: 4,357 ft (1,328 m)

Population (2020)
  - Total: 60
  - Density: 61.6/sq mi (23.78/km^{2})
- Time zone: UTC-8 (Pacific (PST))
  - Summer (DST): UTC-7 (PDT)
- ZIP code: 97621
- FIPS code: 41-05150
- GNIS feature ID: 2745366

Beatty is an unincorporated community and census-designated place (CDP) in Klamath County, Oregon, United States. As of the 2020 census, Beatty had a population of 60. Beatty is along Oregon Route 140 at the confluence of the Sycan and Sprague rivers and is 40 miles (64 km) by highway northeast of Klamath Falls.

As of 2026, the zip code that includes Beatty, 97621, has the highest household income of any zip code in Oregon.

== History ==
Beatty was named for J. L. Beatty, a missionary who lived nearby when the area was in the Klamath Indian Reservation. The post office in Beatty, ZIP code 97621, was established in 1913. Toby "Winema" Riddle is buried near Beatty.

Beatty had a station on the Oregon, California and Eastern Railway, which by 1927 reached from Klamath Falls to Bly. A 1941 timetable lists Beatty as the 13th stop east of Klamath Falls between Sprague River and Sycan. After 1990, the rail line passing near Beatty became part of a rail trail, the OC&E Woods Line State Trail, managed by the Oregon Parks and Recreation Department.

== Demographics ==
Historical population
Census	Pop.	Note	%±
2020	60		—
U.S. Decennial Census

== Climate ==
This region experiences warm (but not hot) and dry summers, with no average monthly temperatures above 71.6 °F (22.0 °C). According to the Köppen Climate Classification system, Beatty has a warm-summer Mediterranean climate, abbreviated "Csb" on climate maps.

== Education ==
It is within the Klamath County School District.

It is in the territory of Klamath Community College.
