= Thompson Reservoir (Oregon) =

Reservoir in Lake County, Oregon, United States

- Location of Thompson Reservoir in Oregon Thompson Reservoir (the United States)
- Coordinates: 42°57′52″N 121°05′16″W
- Primary inflows: intermittent streams
- Primary outflows: Silver Creek
- Basin countries: United States
- Surface area: 2,159.2 acres (10 km^{2})
- Water volume: 7,750 acre⋅ft (9,560,000 m^{3})
- Shore length^{1}: 26.7 mi (40 km)
- Surface elevation: 4,953 ft (1,510 m)
- ^{1} Shore length is not a well-defined measure.

Thompson Reservoir, also known as Thompson Valley Reservoir, is an irrigation reservoir on the upper East Fork of Silver Creek in the Fremont National Forest, approximately ten miles upstream from Silver Lake, Oregon, in the United States. Constructed in 1930 alongside a dam by the Silver Lake Irrigation District, Thompson Reservoir spans roughly 1800 acres and can hold 7750 acre-feet of water.

== Biology ==
Thompson Reservoir is classified as mesotrophic. There are low densities of A. formosa in the spring and low densities of C. hirundinella and M. granulata in summer. Due to the extreme water fluctuations from reservoir operations, macrophytes are scarce.

== Recreation ==
Thompson Reservoir is accessible by road. It contains two United States Forest Service campgrounds. The reservoir itself is located within the National Forest, but half of the shoreline is held by private owners. The dominant fish species is the tui chub and its high population has resulted in a decline of rainbow trout. As a result, each spring the reservoir is stocked with about 200,000 fingerling trout. Due to the overpopulation of "rough fish", the camping facilities are not heavily used.

== See also ==
- List of lakes in Oregon
