= Sprague River (Oregon) =

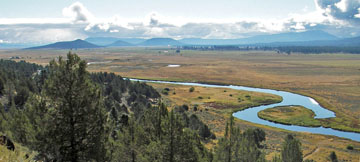
- The lower Sprague River

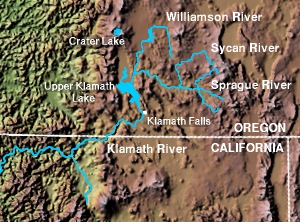
- Sprague River and vicinity

- Location of the mouth of the Sprague River in Oregon
- Etymology: Capt. F.B. Sprague, commander of Fort Klamath in 1866

Location
- Country: United States
- State: Oregon
- County: Klamath

Physical characteristics
- Source: Confluence of the Sprague River's north and south forks
  - location: near Bly, Klamath County, Oregon
  - coordinates: 42°26′16″N 121°06′34″W
  - elevation: 4,325 ft (1,318 m)
- Mouth: Williamson River
  - location: Chiloquin, Klamath County, Oregon
  - coordinates: 42°34′16″N 121°52′28″W
  - elevation: 4,163 ft (1,269 m)
- Basin size: 1,565 sq mi (4,050 km^{2})
- Discharge
  - location: 1 mile (1.6 km) northeast of Chiloquin, 5.4 miles (8.7 km) from mouth
  - average: 580 cu ft/s (16 m^{3}/s)
  - minimum: 50 cu ft/s (1.4 m^{3}/s)
  - maximum: 14,900 cu ft/s (420 m^{3}/s)

National Wild and Scenic River
- Official name: Sprague River (North Fork)
- Type: Scenic
- Designated: October 28, 1988

The Sprague River is a tributary of the Williamson River, approximately 75 miles (121 km) long, in southwestern Oregon in the United States. It drains an arid volcanic plateau region east of the Cascade Range in the watershed of the Klamath River.

It is formed by the confluence of its north and south forks in eastern Klamath County, approximately 35 miles (56 km) east-northeast of Klamath Falls at 42.437650°N 121.109435°W. The North Fork Sprague River, 30 miles (48 km), rises in southwestern Lake County in the Fremont National Forest near Gearhart Mountain at 42.5287618°N 120.8183115°W and flows southwest. The South Fork Sprague River, 30 miles (48 km), rises northeast of Quartz Mountain Pass at 42.4815400°N 120.7869201°W and flows west-northwest. The combined stream flows west through the broad Sprague Valley, past the small communities of Bly, Beatty, and Sprague River. It joins the Williamson from the east at Chiloquin, about 10 miles (16 km) north of the mouth of the Williamson on Upper Klamath Lake at 42.5712475°N 121.8744593°W.

It receives the Sycan River from the north at Beatty. Superb trout fishing exists in the Sprague and its tributaries.

== See also ==
- List of rivers of Oregon
- List of longest streams of Oregon
