= Sycan River =

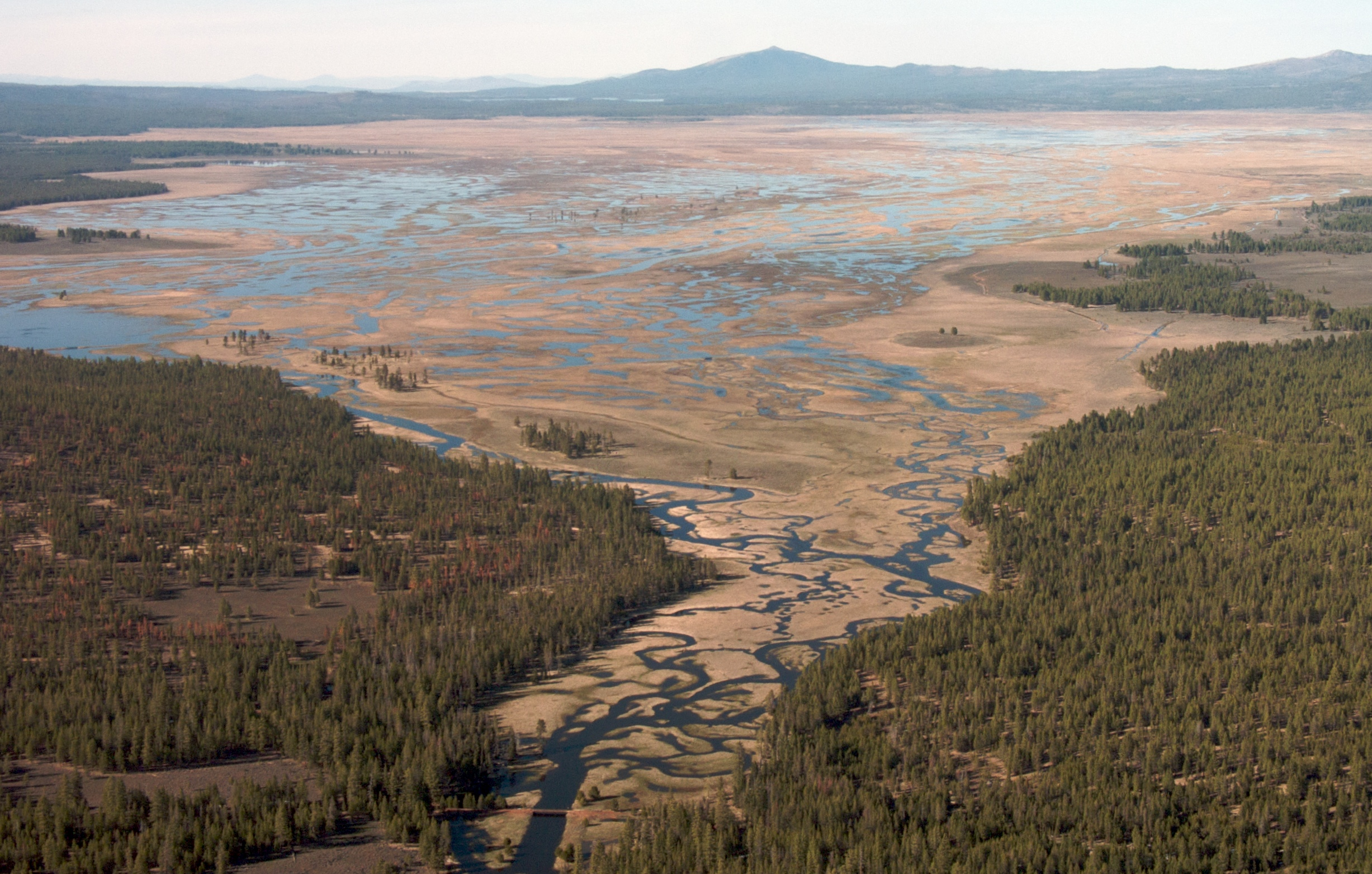
- Aerial view of Sycan Marsh

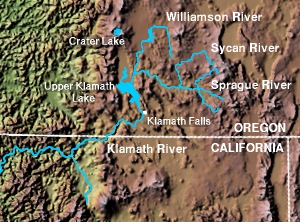
- Map of Sycan River region

- Location of the mouth of the Sycan River in Oregon
- Etymology: after Sycan Marsh, from the Klamath words saiga and keni, meaning level, grassy place

Location
- Country: United States
- State: Oregon
- County: Lake and Klamath

Physical characteristics
- Source: south of Slide Mountain and Summer Lake
  - location: Fremont National Forest, Lake County
  - coordinates: 42°38′50″N 120°44′08″W
- Mouth: Sprague River
  - location: near Beatty, Klamath County
  - coordinates: 42°27′40″N 121°17′13″W
  - elevation: 4,311 ft (1,314 m)
- Length: 75 mi (121 km)
- Basin size: 559 sq mi (1,450 km^{2})
- Discharge
  - average: 149 cu ft/s (4.2 m^{3}/s)
  - minimum: 1 cu ft/s (0.028 m^{3}/s)

National Wild and Scenic River
- Type: Scenic, Recreational
- Designated: October 28, 1988

The Sycan River is a tributary, about 75 miles (121 km) long, of the Sprague River in the U.S. state of Oregon. The headwaters are in highlands in the Fremont National Forest south of Summer Lake. The river runs northwest into the Sycan Marsh in southern Lake County, from which it flows generally southwest to join the Sprague River near Beatty, in Klamath County. The uppermost 59 miles (95 km) of the stream are part of the National Wild and Scenic Rivers System.

== Course ==
Near its headwaters, the Sycan River, flowing west, receives Boulder Creek from the right and the South Fork Sycan River from the left. The Hanan Trail, a hiking path, runs roughly parallel to the river along this stretch, which is part of the National Wild and Scenic Rivers System. Turning northwest, the Sycan receives Rock, Kelly, and Nixon creeks from the right before turning west again. Over the next stretch, Cummings Creek enters from the right, Rifle Creek from the left, and the Sycan leaves Lake County and enters Klamath County. Skull Creek then enters from the left and Currier Creek from the right.

Downstream of Currier Creek, Paradise Creek enters from the left, and the Sycan turns northwest and then north, leaving Klamath County and re-entering Lake County. Slightly north of the border, Long Creek enters from the right. After turning west and southwest, the river enters Sycan Marsh, a wetland of about 50 square miles (130 km^{2}). Continuing southwest through the marsh, the river leaves Lake County and re-enters Klamath County. Further downstream, Merritt Creek enters from the left. Meandering west and then south, the Sycan receives Blue Creek from the left, enters Sprague River Valley, receives Snake Creek from the left, and enters the Sprague River north of Beatty.

== Recreation ==
The river supports rainbow, brook, brown, and bull trout. The upper river offers good fly fishing for small brook trout, while brown trout are found only in the lower river downstream of the marsh. Rough forest roads provide access to parts of the lightly fished river. The lower 12 miles (19 km) is generally bordered by privately owned land, where permission is needed for access.

The Nature Conservancy, a nonprofit organization that owns most of the Sycan Marsh and some of the surrounding forest, offers self-guided automobile tours of the marsh. No hunting, fishing, camping, or pets are allowed in the preserve, which has no services and few opportunities for hiking. However, the marsh, attracting thousands of migrating tundra swans, sandhill cranes, yellow rails, black tern, white-faced ibises, and other species, offers opportunities for bird-watching. Access to the preserve is by unpaved forest roads.

== See also ==
- List of longest streams of Oregon
- List of rivers of Oregon

== Works cited ==
- McArthur, Lewis A., and McArthur, Lewis L. (2003) [1928]. Oregon Geographic Names, 7th ed. Portland: Oregon Historical Society Press. ISBN 0-87595-277-1.
- Sheehan, Madelynne Diness (2005). Fishing in Oregon: The Complete Oregon Fishing Guide, 10th ed. Scappoose, Oregon: Flying Pencil Publications. ISBN 0-916473-15-5.
