= Horton, Oregon =

Unincorporated community in the state of Oregon, United States

Coordinates: 44°12′35″N 123°29′36″W

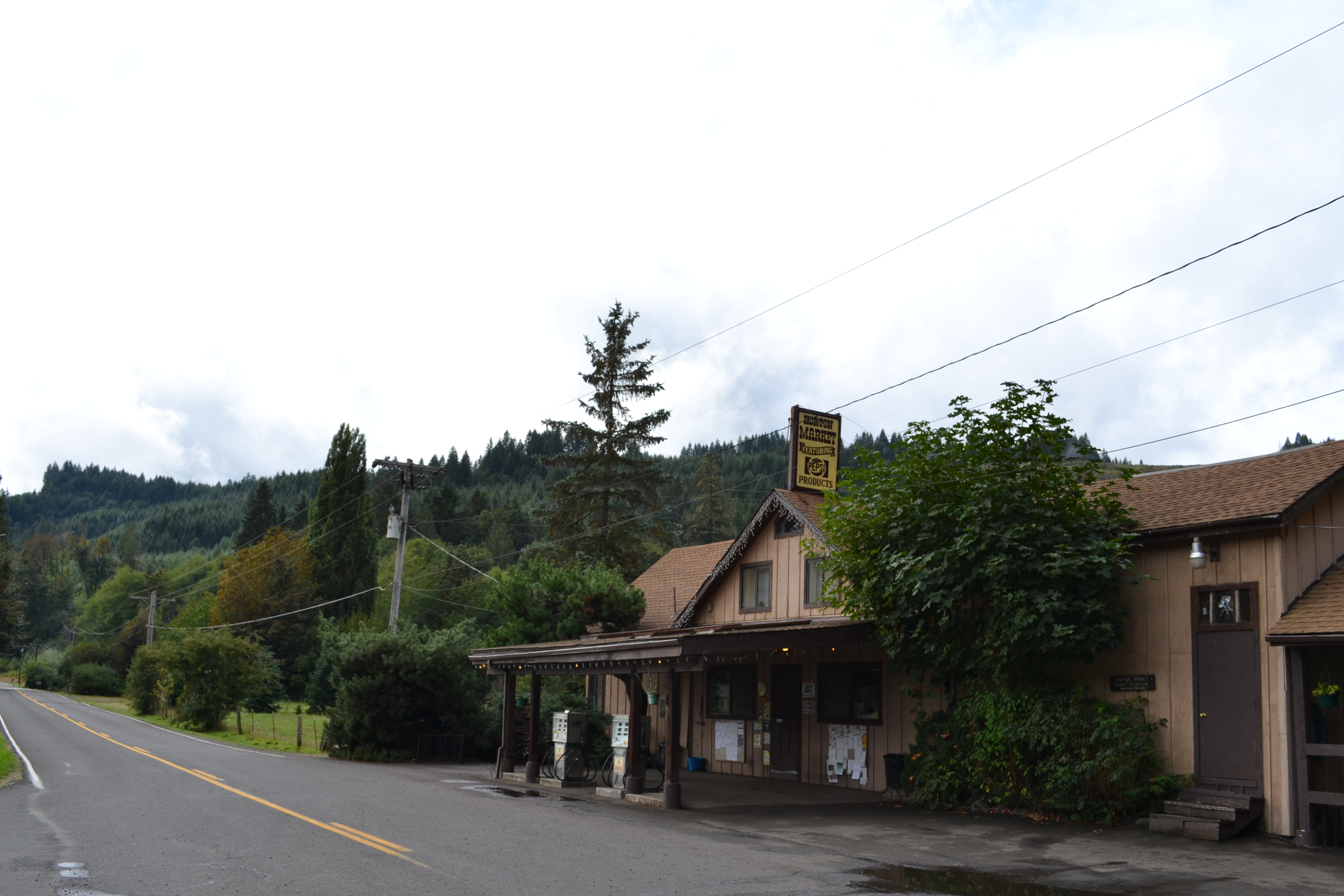
Horton general store

Horton is an unincorporated community in Lane County, Oregon, United States. It is about three miles northeast of Blachly, in the Lake Creek valley of the Central Oregon Coast Range.

== History ==
In 1903, three brothers—E. J. Horton, Sam M. Horton, and J. C. Horton—settled in the area and started a sawmill they named Horton Mill. When the post office was established in 1913 it was named after the family. Sam Horton was the first postmaster; the office closed in 1960.

Horton's economy was based on the lumber and dairy industries. In 1915 Horton had a public school, two churches and two fraternal lodges.
