= Olene, Oregon =

Unincorporated community in the state of Oregon, United States

- Unincorporated community
- Location within Oregon and the United States Olene (the United States)
- Coordinates: 42°10′19″N 121°37′51″W
- Country: United States
- State: Oregon
- County: Klamath
- Elevation: 4,154 ft (1,266 m)
- Time zone: UTC-8 (Pacific (PST))
  - Summer (DST): UTC-7 (PDT)
- GNIS feature ID: 1124978

Olene is an unincorporated community in Klamath County, Oregon, United States. The community is 10 miles (16 km) southeast of Klamath Falls on Oregon Route 140. Olene currently has a general store and at one time it had a school.

== History ==
In 1940 Olene had a population of 62 and was considered a suburb of Klamath Falls. Olene was the center of a prosperous dairy and potato farming district.

According to William Gladstone Steel, Olene is a Klamath word meaning "eddy place" or "place of drift." O. C. Applegate adopted the word for the site in 1884 when the post office was established. The original Olene post office was up the Lost River from the current townsite. When the post office closed in 1966, it was near The Gap, a restriction in the Lost River. This gap is also known as Olene Gap, and the Olene Hot Springs are nearby.

The community was along a rail line operated jointly by Southern Pacific and Burlington Northern. Today the OC&E Woods Line State Trail, a rails to trails conversion, passes through Olene. Originally built by the Oregon, California and Eastern Railway, the railroad line reached Olene in 1918.

A geothermal drilling project near Olene was completed in early 2013, and the temperature produced by that well was in excess of 280 °F (138 °C). Plans included drilling two or three more wells for a commercial-scale power plant, with a planned electrical capacity of 21 MWe.
