= Bly, Oregon =

Unincorporated community in the state of Oregon, United States

- Census-designated place
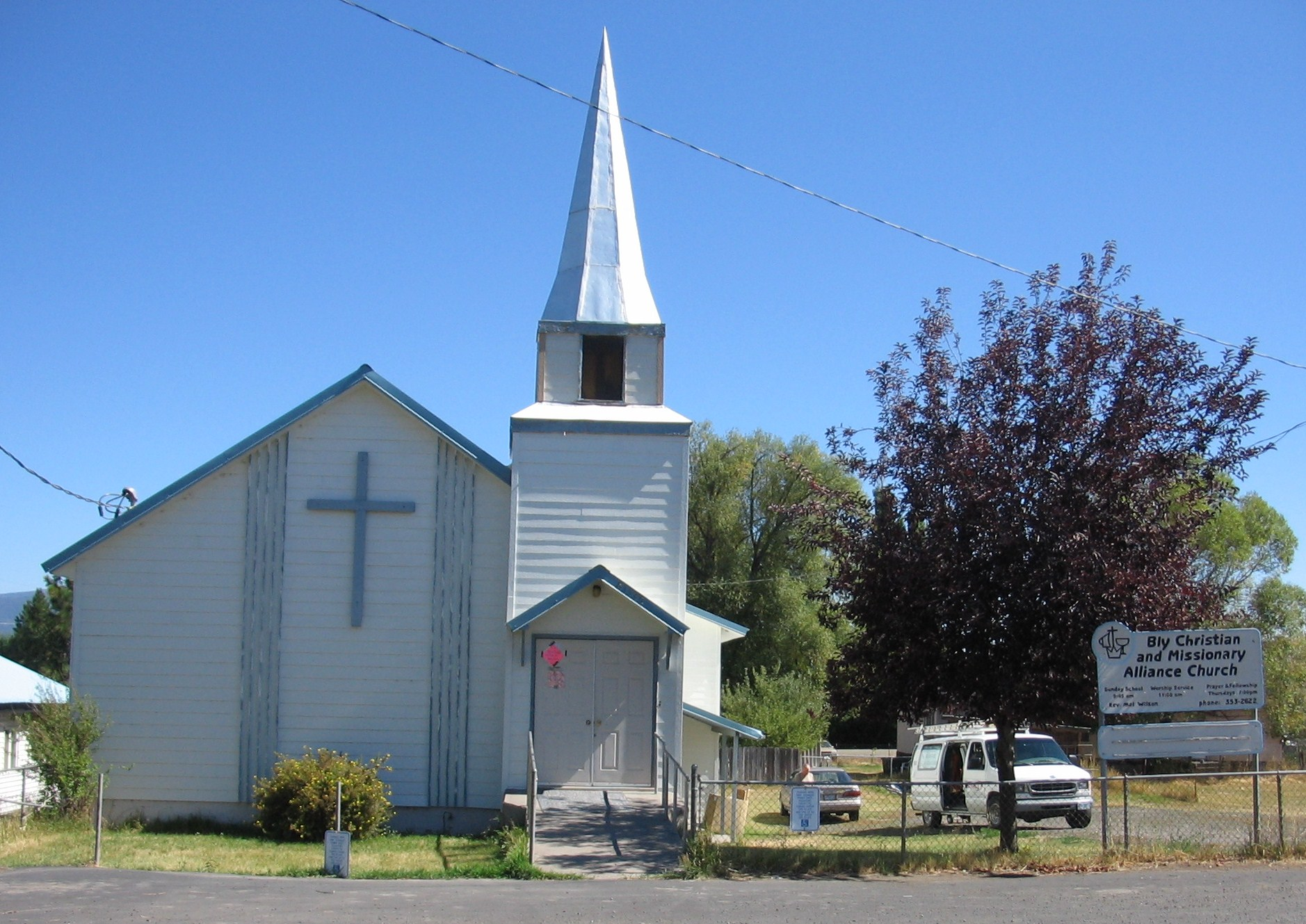
- Standing Stone Church of the Christian and Missionary Alliance

- Location within the state of Oregon Bly (the United States)
- Coordinates: 42°23′30″N 121°02′36″W
- Country: United States
- State: Oregon
- County: Klamath
- unincorporated community: 1873

Area
  - Total: 0.85 sq mi (2.19 km^{2})
  - Land: 0.85 sq mi (2.19 km^{2})
  - Water: 0 sq mi (0.00 km^{2})
- Elevation: 4,367 ft (1,331 m)

Population (2020)
  - Total: 207
  - Density: 244.9/sq mi (94.57/km^{2})
- Time zone: UTC-8 (Pacific (PST))
  - Summer (DST): UTC-7 (PDT)
- ZIP code: 97622
- Area codes: 458 and 541
- FIPS code: 41-07150
- GNIS feature ID: 2805446
- Website: https://blyoregon.org

Historical population
Census	Pop.	Note	%±
1910	100		—
1920	100		0.0%
1940	800		—
1950	800		0.0%
1960	600		−25.0%
1970	500		−16.7%
1980	750		50.0%
1990	750		0.0%
2000	486		−35.2%
2020	207		—

Bly is an unincorporated community and census-designated place in Klamath County, Oregon, United States. By highway, it is about 50 miles (80 km) east of Klamath Falls. As of 2020, the population was 207.

== Geography ==
Bly is in southeastern Klamath County, slightly west of Lake County, along Oregon Route 140. By highway, it is about 37 miles (60 km) west of Lakeview and 50 miles (80 km) east of Klamath Falls.

Fish Hole Creek, which flows through the community, meets the South Fork Sprague River slightly north of Bly. Fremont National Forest surrounds Bly except on the northwest. Gearhart Mountain Wilderness is about 10 miles (16 km) northeast of Bly.

=== Climate ===
This region experiences warm (but not hot) and dry summers, with no average monthly temperatures above 71.6 °F (22.0 °C). According to the Köppen Climate Classification system, Bly has a warm-summer Mediterranean climate, abbreviated "Csb" on climate maps.

== History ==
The name Bly comes from the Klamath word p'lai, meaning 'up' or 'high', referring to its location at the upper Sprague River. The Sprague River post office was established in the area in 1873, and the name was changed to Bly in 1883. At that time, the community was near the east end of the Klamath Indian Reservation. The 21st-century community of Sprague River is downstream and west of Bly and Beatty.

Around 1900, Bly had two general stores, two hotels, and a saloon. A history published in 1905 referred to the surrounding area as the "precinct" or the "valley" and estimated its total population at 750. The chief products of the valley at that time included cattle, horses, mules, and a few sheep, as well as oats, clover, and hay.

In 1935, the United States Forest Service acquired a 4-acre (16,000 m^{2}) site in Bly for a district ranger station to manage the western part of the Fremont National Forest. The Forest Service paid $625 (equivalent to $14,700 in 2025) for the property. The ranger station was built by Civilian Conservation Corps workers under the supervision of Forest Service district ranger Perry Smith. The seven original buildings at the Bly Ranger Station were constructed between 1936 and 1942. A modern administrative headquarters building was added to the compound in the 1960s. The ranger station compound was listed on the National Register of Historic Places in 1981.

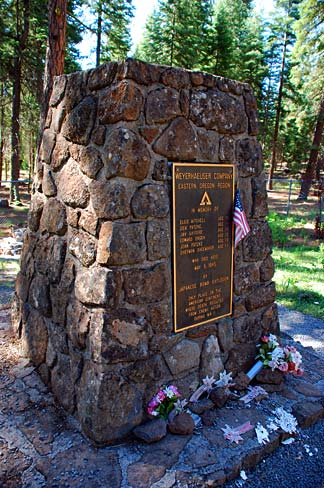
Memorial to the victims of the Japanese balloon bomb

=== World War II ===
Bly is also the site of the only fatalities of World War II in the contiguous U.S. On May 5, 1945, a Japanese Fu-Go balloon bomb exploded as it was being pulled from the woods by curious picnickers. Killed in the explosion were: Elsie Mitchell, 26, wife of minister Archie E. Mitchell; Edward Engen, 13; Richard Patzke, 14; Jay Gifford, 13; Sherman Shoemaker, 11; and Joan Patzke, 13. Rev. Mitchell heard the explosion and discovered the bodies. The victims' families were compensated by the government. A memorial was erected at what is now the Mitchell Recreation Area.

== Parks and recreation ==
The OC&E Woods Line State Trail, the longest linear state park in Oregon, passes through Bly. The 100-mile (160 km) rail trail was built on the roadbeds of the former Oregon, California and Eastern Railway, which ran from Klamath Falls to Bly, and a former spur line, the Woods Line.

== Education ==
It is within the Klamath County School District.

It is in the territory of Klamath Community College.
