= Oregon Parks and Recreation Department =

Government agency

The Oregon Parks and Recreation Department (OPRD), officially known (in state law) as the State Parks and Recreation Department, is the government agency of the U.S. state of Oregon which operates its system of state parks. In addition, it has programs to protect and provide public access to natural and historic resources within the state, including the State Historic Preservation Office, Oregon Heritage Commission, Oregon Commission on Historic Cemeteries, recreation trails, the Ocean Shores Recreation Area, scenic waterways and the Willamette River Greenway. The department's chief sources of funding are the Oregon Lottery, state park user fees. and recreation vehicle license fees. The department also manages the system of rest areas along the highways and freeways within the state. In 2006 the department was delegated responsibility for managing the Oregon State Fair.

The department was created in 1921 as a branch of the Oregon Highway Department (predecessor to the present-day Oregon Department of Transportation). The 1989 Oregon Legislative Assembly transferred authority to a newly created department under its current name effective January 1, 1990. Now independent, the agency was floundering but found a hit when it became one of first to install camping yurts.

In the 2019 fiscal year, Oregon state parks attracted 55 million visitors, a 1.3 percent increase from the previous fiscal year. For the 2010 fiscal year, Oregon ranked first among U.S. states in state park capacity utilization rate, indicating that Oregon's state parks were the most overused. As of 2012, 7.5 percent of lottery revenues in Oregon were dedicated to state and local parks, leading to new park acquisitions and a reduced backlog of maintenance at existing parks. Nevertheless, Oregon ranked 30th in the nation in state park acreage per 1,000 people. At the same time, it ranked second nationally for the number of park visitors per acre, indicating that the state’s limited area of parks are intensively used.

== See also ==
- List of Oregon state parks
