= Oregon Route 66 =

State highway in southern Oregon, US

Oregon Route 66
- Route 66 highlighted in red

Route information
- Maintained by ODOT
- Length: 59.68 mi (96.05 km)
- Existed: 1934–present

Major junctions
- West end: OR 99 in Ashland
- I-5 in Ashland; OR 273 near Ashland
- East end: US 97 / OR 140 in Klamath Falls

Location
- Country: United States
- State: Oregon
- Counties: Jackson, Klamath

Highway system
- Oregon Highways; Interstate; US; State; Named; Scenic
← OR 62	→ OR 70

Oregon Route 66 is an Oregon state highway that runs between the cities of Ashland and Klamath Falls. The highway is known as the Green Springs Highway No. 21 (see Oregon highways and routes), and is signed east-to-west.

== Route description ==
Oregon Route 66 begins (at its western terminus) at an intersection with Oregon Route 99 just east of downtown Ashland. The highway heads northeast, crosses and intersects with Interstate 5, and continues east along the northern edge of the Siskiyou Mountains. Before ascending into the mountains, it passes alongside Emigrant Reservoir. Six miles east of Ashland, the highway intersects with Oregon Route 273, near the Klamath Falls Junction.

The highway then passes over the mountains. The highway ends at an interchange with U.S. Route 97 in Klamath Falls; just west of this interchange the highway intersects and briefly overlaps Oregon Route 140. OR 140 continues east of the US 97 interchange, past the Klamath Falls airport, and eventually towards Lakeview.

Prior to 1934, the stretch of OR 66 between Klamath Falls Junction and Klamath Falls was signed as US 97; when the highway between Klamath Falls and Weed, California was completed, that route became US 97, and the Green Springs Highway became OR 66. At that time, OR 66 west of Klamath Falls Junction (and OR 273 south of there) was U.S. Route 99; in 1938 a new route over Siskiyou Pass was completed, and the highway assumed its current configuration.

OR 66 is 59 miles (95 km) in length.

== Major intersections ==
County	Location	mi	km	Destinations	Notes
Jackson	Ashland	0.00	0.00	OR 99 – Ashland City Center	
Jackson	Ashland	1.32	2.12	I-5 – Medford, Yreka	I-5 exit 14.
Jackson		6.46	10.40	OR 273 south (Old Siskiyou Highway)	
Klamath	Klamath Falls	58.86	94.73	OR 140 west – Lake of the Woods, Fish Lake, Medford	Western end of OR 140 overlap
Klamath	Klamath Falls	59.05	95.03	US 97 – Klamath Falls, Bend, Weed OR 140 east to OR 39 – Merrill, Lakeview	Interchange; eastern end of OR 140 overlap; roadway continues east as OR 140
1.000 mi = 1.609 km; 1.000 km = 0.621 mi: Concurrency terminus
