= Lake of the Woods Ranger Station =

- U.S. National Register of Historic Places
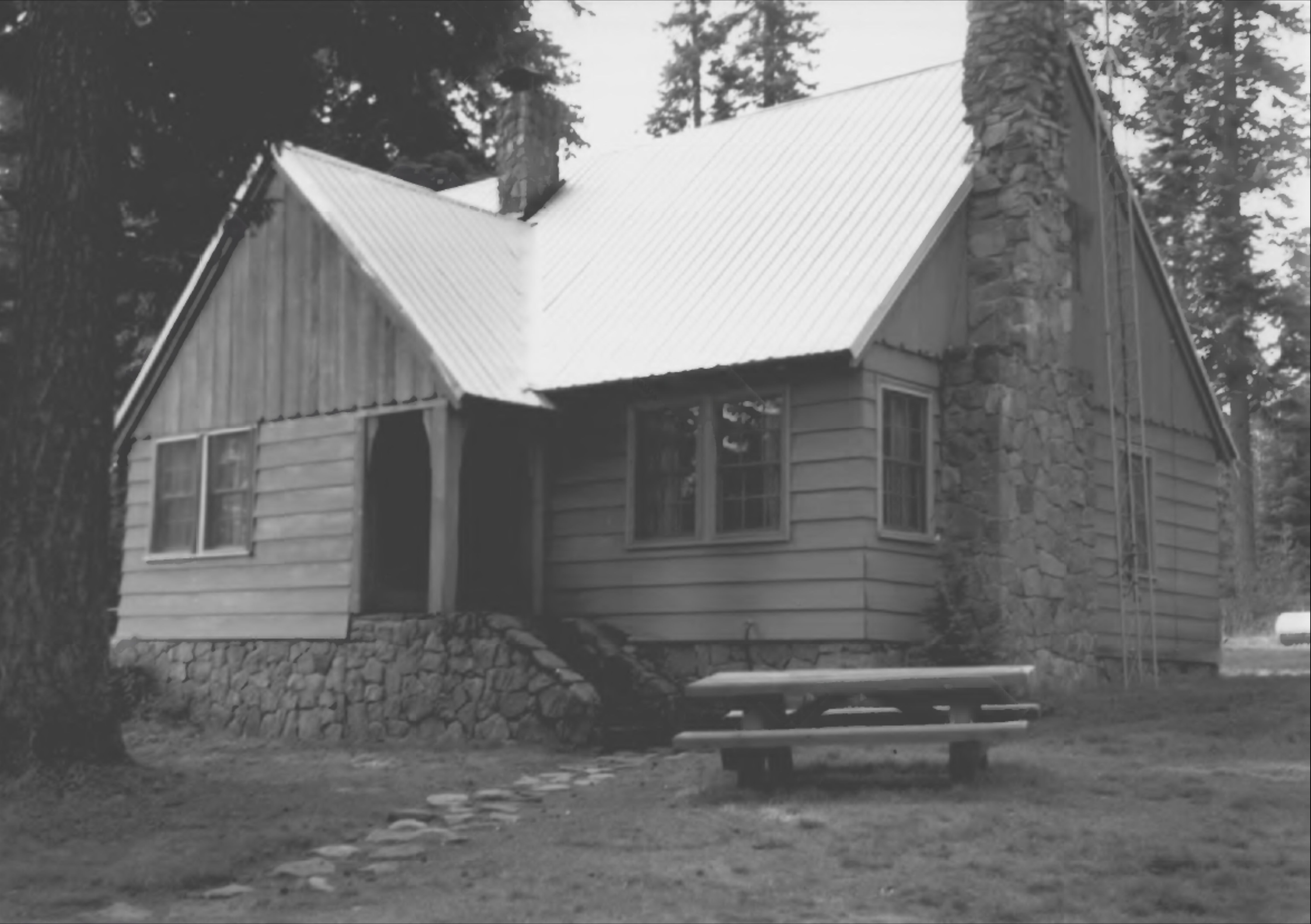
- Lake of the Woods Ranger's Residence, 1983

- Location within Oregon Location within the United States
- Location: Fremont-Winema National Forests
- Nearest city: Klamath Falls, Oregon, USA
- Coordinates: 42.3867°N 122.2269°W
- Built: 1937–1939
- Architect: United States Forest Service, Pacific Northwest Regional Architecture Group
- Architectural style: Cascadian rustic
- NRHP reference No.: 86000845
- Added to NRHP: 1986

The Lake of the Woods Ranger Station is a United States Forest Service compound consisting of eight buildings overlooking Lake of the Woods in the Fremont-Winema National Forests of southern Oregon. All of the ranger station structures were built by the Civilian Conservation Corps between 1937 and 1939. Today, the compound serves as a Forest Service work center, and the old ranger station office is a visitor center. The ranger station is listed on the National Register of Historic Places.

== History ==
In the early 20th century, the forest road networks were not well developed. To facilitate work in National Forests, the Forest Service built district ranger stations at strategic locations within the forest to house full-time employees and provide logistics support to fire patrols and project crews working in remote areas of the forest. After World War II, the Forest Service greatly expanded its road network, allowing employees to get to most forest areas within a few hours. As a result, many of the more isolated ranger stations were closed or converted to summer guard stations. The historic Lake of the Woods Ranger Station was established during this early period and is still used by Forest Service crews today.

In 1898, the Cascade Forest Reserve was created in southern Oregon. The forest area around Lake of the Woods became part of the reserve. The forest was managed as part of that Cascade reserve until 1908, when the area was transferred to the Crater National Forest. The Forest Service issued the first residential use permit for a private cabin in the Lake of the Woods area in 1916. In 1920, the Forest Service built a public campground at the lake. The site was very popular, with 1,850 summer visitors using the campground the first year it open. In 1923, the road into the Lake of the Woods area was improved. That same year, the Forest Service built a second campground to accommodate the increasing number of people vacationing at the lake. In 1926, the Forest Service issued a permit allowing the Lake of the Woods Recreation Company to build a resort at the lake. During this period, the only Forest Service facility at Lake of the Woods was a small log cabin originally built by a fur trapper, possibly around 1900. In 1929, the Forest Service replaced the cabin with a much larger ranger office at the north end of the lake.

In 1932, the Lake of the Woods Ranger Station was transferred to the Rogue River National Forest along with the lake side campgrounds and the surrounding forest. In the mid-1930s, the Civilian Conservation Corps built a number of new buildings at the ranger station. All of the structures but one were built in the Cascadian rustic style.

In 1961, the Forest Service transferred the Lake of the Woods and the surrounding forest to the newly formed Winema National Forest. In 2002, the Winema National Forest was administratively combined with the Fremont National Forest, becoming the Fremont-Winema National Forests. The Winema National Forest's Klamath Ranger District still uses the ranger station as a work center while the old office is now a visitor center during the summer months.

All eight of the ranger station buildings are historically important and are still in excellent condition. Because the Lake of the Woods Ranger Station is of unique historic value as an early Forest Service ranger station, the compound was listed on the National Register of Historic Places on 8 April 1986. The historic district covers approximately 9.6 acres (39,000 m^{2}).

== Structures ==
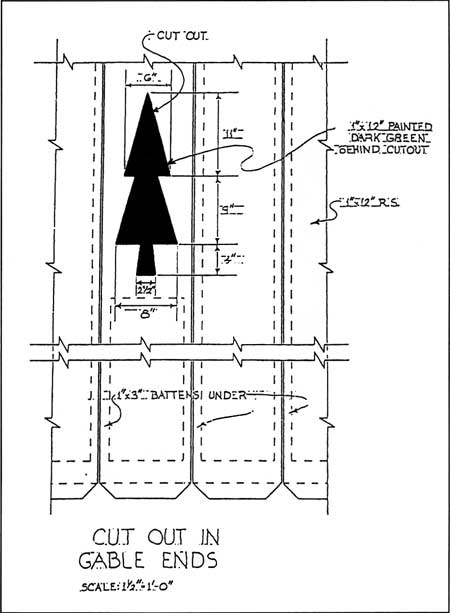
Forest Service open pine tree logo design

With eight historic buildings, the Lake of the Woods Ranger Station is a classic Forest Service ranger station. The buildings were designed by the Forest Service's Pacific Northwest Regional Architecture Group. All of the structures were built by the Civilian Conservation Corps between 1937 and 1939. Their work included a ranger station administrative office, two ranger residences, a crew house, garage, gas and oil shed, storage shed, and a barn. The buildings except the barn were constructed in the Cascadian rustic architectural style using weatherboard, wood shingles, native stone, and concrete as the basic building materials. The barn is a peeled-log structure. Many of the gables have the open pine tree logo cutouts that were common to Forest Service structures built during the 1930s.

- The Ranger Station Office is a one and a half-story wood-frame building on a concrete foundation with a fieldstone veneer on the foundation's exterior face. It has a high gabled roof with center cross gable with a stone chimney straddling the roof ridge where the gables join the main roof. The main entrance is recessed under west center gable. There are five stone steps leading to a flagstone porch platform. The porch is supported by four large square timber posts with curving brackets at the top. The rear entry is also located below a gable. The back porch is supported by square timber post with curved bracket at the top. The building's exterior is covered horizontal clapboard to eave line with vertical boards on all the gable ends above the eaves. There eight-over-eight double-hung sash windows on all four side of the building. Three open pine tree logo cutouts located on the gable end above the front porch. The center tree is larger than the flanking trees. A "Visitor Center" sign is located below the pine tree cutouts. The structure is covered by a texture metal roof. Inside the office, the walls have fluted knotty-pine paneling with plain pine baseboards. There is a stone fireplace with a wooden mantel. The interior floors are wood and the ceiling is covered with acoustical tile with exposed boxed beams.
- The Ranger Residence is a one and a half-story T-shaped building on a concrete foundation with an exposed fieldstone veneer. It is a wood-frame structure with horizontal clapboard exterior to eave line and vertical boards above the eave line on the gable ends. The building has a high gable roof with large gable on east end and projecting center porch gable on south façade. The original wood-shingles roof has been replaced by textured sheet metal. The front porch is supported by two heavy squared timber posts with curved brackets at the top. Stone steps lead to an open porch with a flagstone surface. The rear entry is on the north side of the building. The covered back porch is supported by a single heavy squared timber post with top bracket matching the posts on the front porch. There is an exterior stone chimney on north gable end of the building. The exterior has simple six-over-six double-hung sash windows. Inside the residence the walls are covered in fluted knotty-pine paneling with plain pine baseboard with wood floors. A stone fireplace is a central feature of the home. The ceiling has exposed boxed beams separated by fiberboard paneling.
- The Assistant Ranger Residence is a one and a half-story L-shaped building on a concrete foundation with an exposed fieldstone veneer. It is a wood-frame structure with horizontal clapboard exterior to eave line and vertical boards above the eave line on the gable ends. The building as a high gable roof with offset gable on north façade forming the buildings L-shape. The roof covering is textured sheet metal. The open front porch is covered by the projecting gable and is supported by two square timber posts with curved brackets at the top. The porch has flagstone platform accessed by five stone steps. There is a chimney on west side of the building. The exterior has six-over-six double-hung sash windows.
- There is a Residential Garage next to the ranger residence. It is a rectangular, wood-frame structure on a concrete foundation with exposed stone veneer. The garage has a high gable roof. The exterior walls are covered with horizontal clapboard up to the eave line with vertical boards above the eave line on the gable ends. There are two leaf-hinged doors on north gable end. A single large pine tree cutout is centered above the doors near the top of the gable. The original wood-shingle roof has been replaced by textured sheet metal.
- The ranger station Crew Bunkhouse also serves as an equipment warehouse. The crew house is a one and a half-story rectangular building. It has a wood-frame structure on a concrete foundation with exposed stone veneer. It has horizontal clapboard exterior to eave line and vertical boards with battens above the eave line on the gable ends. The building has a high gable roof with center porch gable on east façade. The open front porch below the center gable is supported by heavy square timber posts with curved brackets at the top. The front steps and porch platform are concrete. A sliding wooden door next to the main entrance provides access to the warehouse storage area. The exterior has six-over-six double-hung sash windows in combinations with mullion frames. A single large pine tree cutout is centered above the porch on the center entrance gable. There are pine tree cutouts on the north and south gable ends as well. The building has a textured sheet metal roof.
- The ranger station's Gas and Lube Building is a wood-frame structure on a concrete foundation with exposed stone veneer. The exterior walls are covered by horizontal clapboards to the eave line with vertical boards on the gable ends above the eave line. It has a high gable roof. The center section of the roof's northern slope extends out to form shed-porch that covers the gas pump. The main entrance to the shed is also under the porch. The shed extension is supported by two pairs of square timber posts with curving brackets at the top. There is a loading dock on west gable end of the structure. A sliding door provides access to the loading dock. The building has a textured sheet metal roof.
- There is a small Storage Shed near the gas and lube building. It is a wood-frame structure with a gable roof on a simple concrete foundation. The exterior walls are covered with horizontal clapboard up to the eave line with vertical boards on gable ends above the eave line. The structures only door is on the north side. The structure has simple six-pane single-sash windows. The shed has a textured sheet metal roof.
- The Barn is the only historic building that is not in the Cascadian Rustic architectural style. It is a one and a half-story rectangular peeled-log structure built on a concrete pier foundation. The barn has high bell-cast gambrel roof covered with wood shingles. The log walls interlock at notched corners. On each side, the logs project out approximately 1 foot (0.30 m) beyond the wall corners. The windows on ground floor are single sash of four or six panes. The main door is offset from center at west end of the structure. The door is wood with a six-pane window inset window. There is also a single-leaf horizontal sliding door on east end to allow stock access. On the second floor, there is a two-leaf hay door in the center of the west gable, providing access to the hayloft.
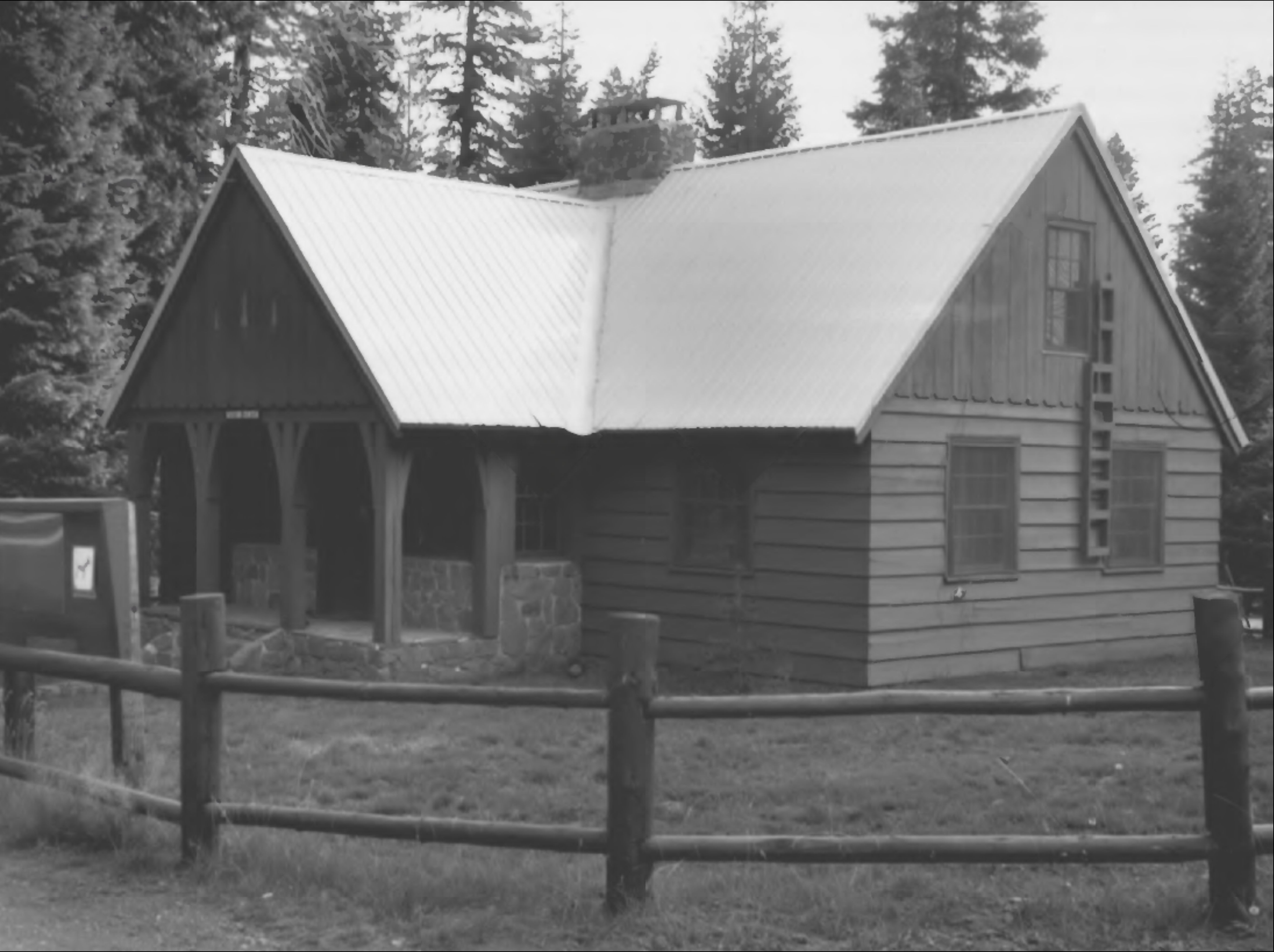
*Office (Visitor Center)

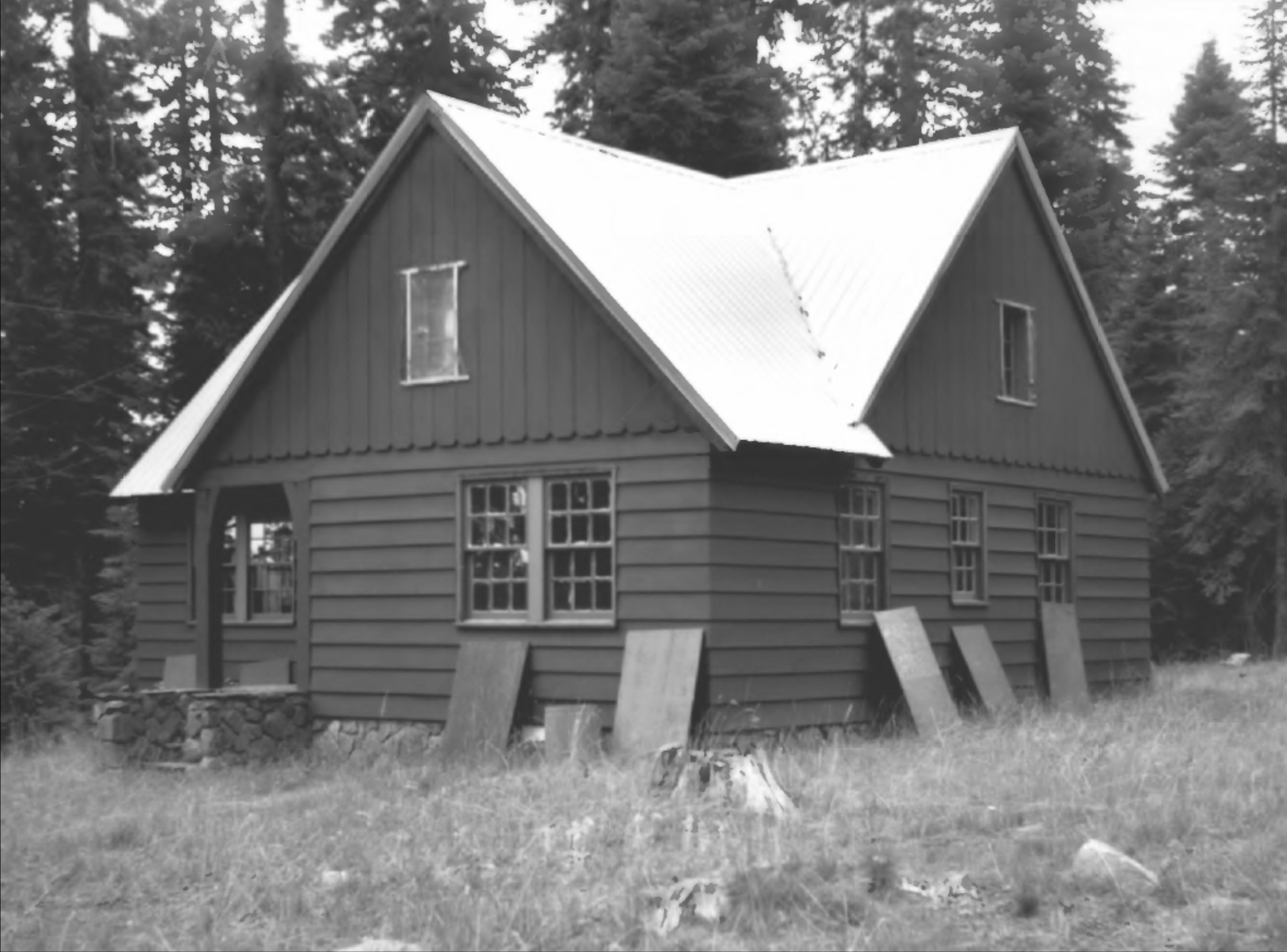
*Assistant ranger house

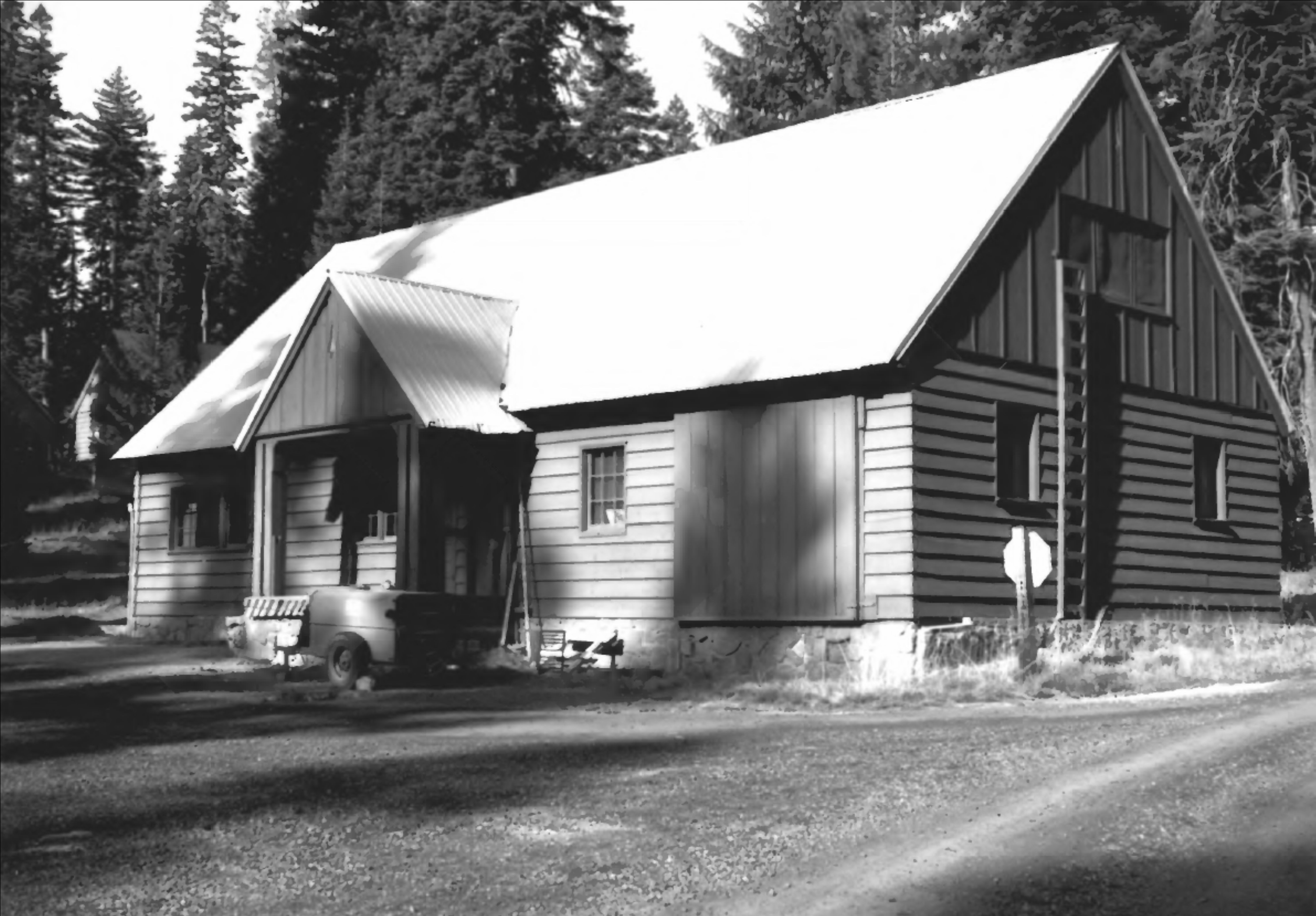
*Crew bunkhouse

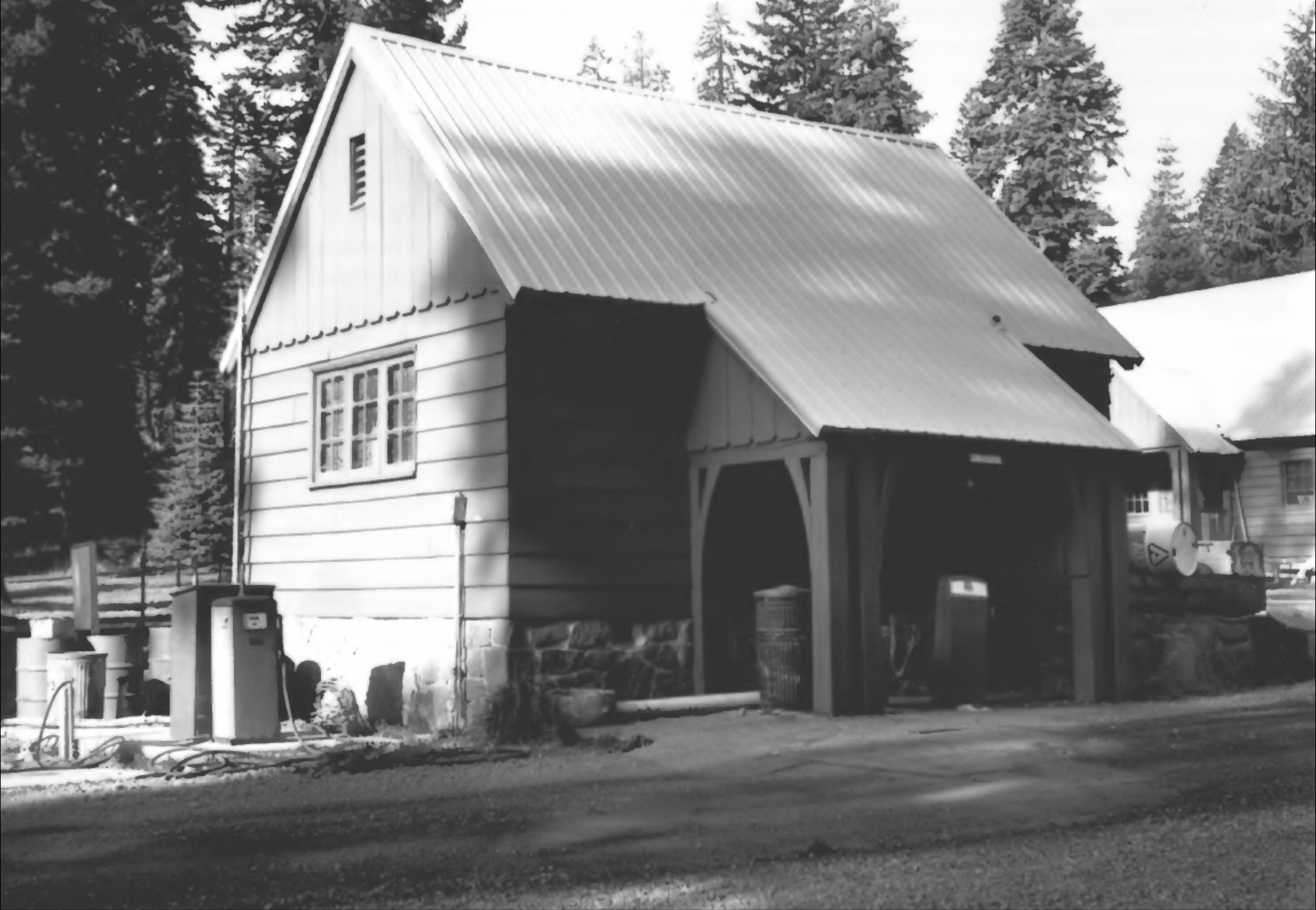
*Gas and lube building

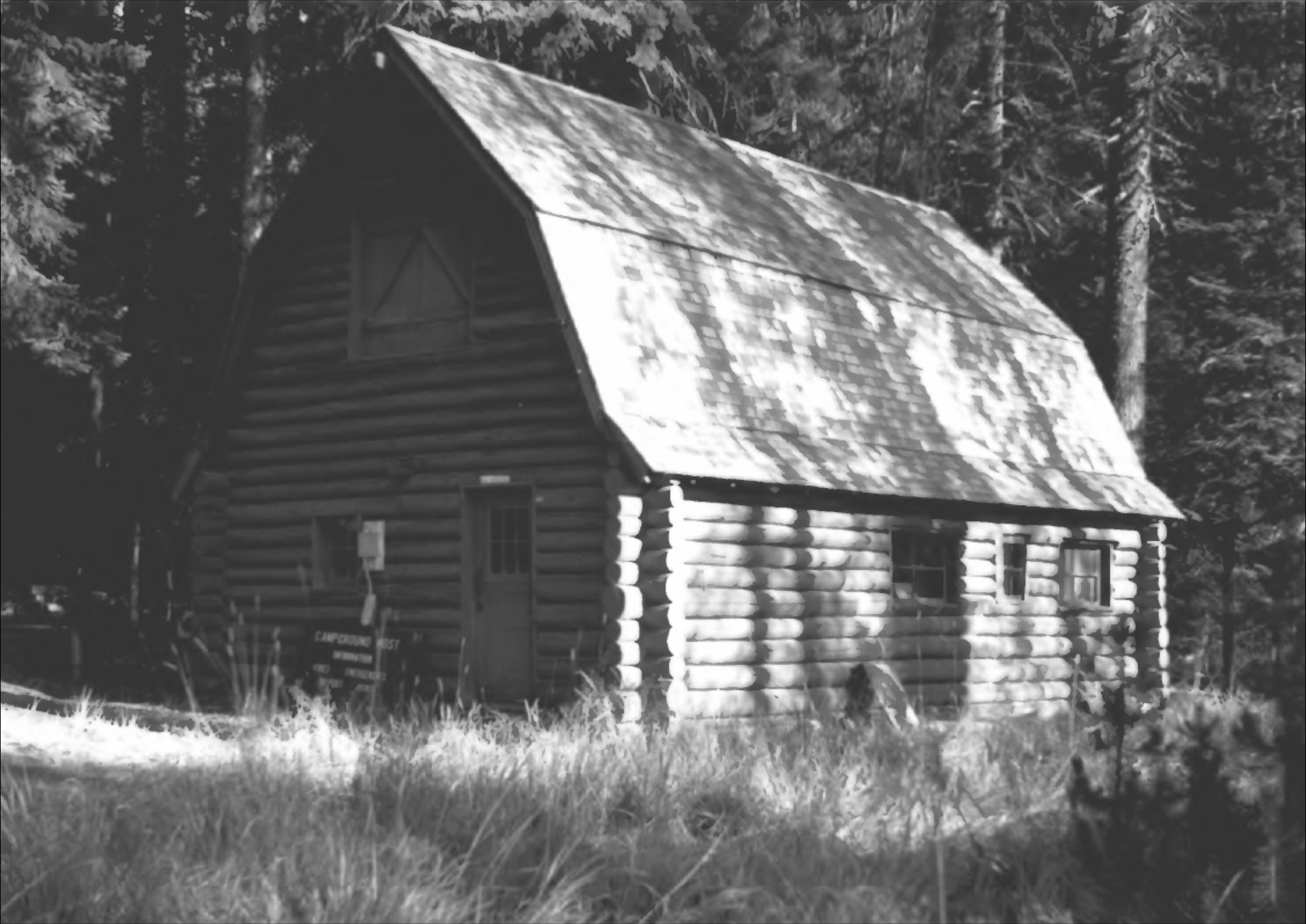
*Ranger station barn

== Location ==
The Lake of the Wood Ranger Station is located in western Klamath County, Oregon, surrounded by the Winema National Forest. The elevation at the site is 4,997 feet (1,523 m) above sea level. The area around the ranger station is a dense, multi-storied mixed conifer forest, dominated by Douglas-fir and white fir. There are also has some ponderosa pine, lodgepole pine, and aspen in the surrounding forest. On area receives an average of 30 inches (760 mm) to 44 inches (1,100 mm) of precipitation annually.

The ranger station is located near the crest of the Cascade Mountains on the north shore of Lake of the Woods. It is 33 miles (53 km) west of Klamath Falls and 43 miles (69 km) east of Medford, Oregon. The ranger station is just off Oregon Route 140. All of the historic buildings are located on a narrow strip of land between the south side of the highway and the north shore of the lake. The old ranger station office is now a Forest Service visitor center that is open during the summer.
