= Malone Springs =

Watershed in Klamath County, Oregon

Coordinates: 42.530°N 122.085°W

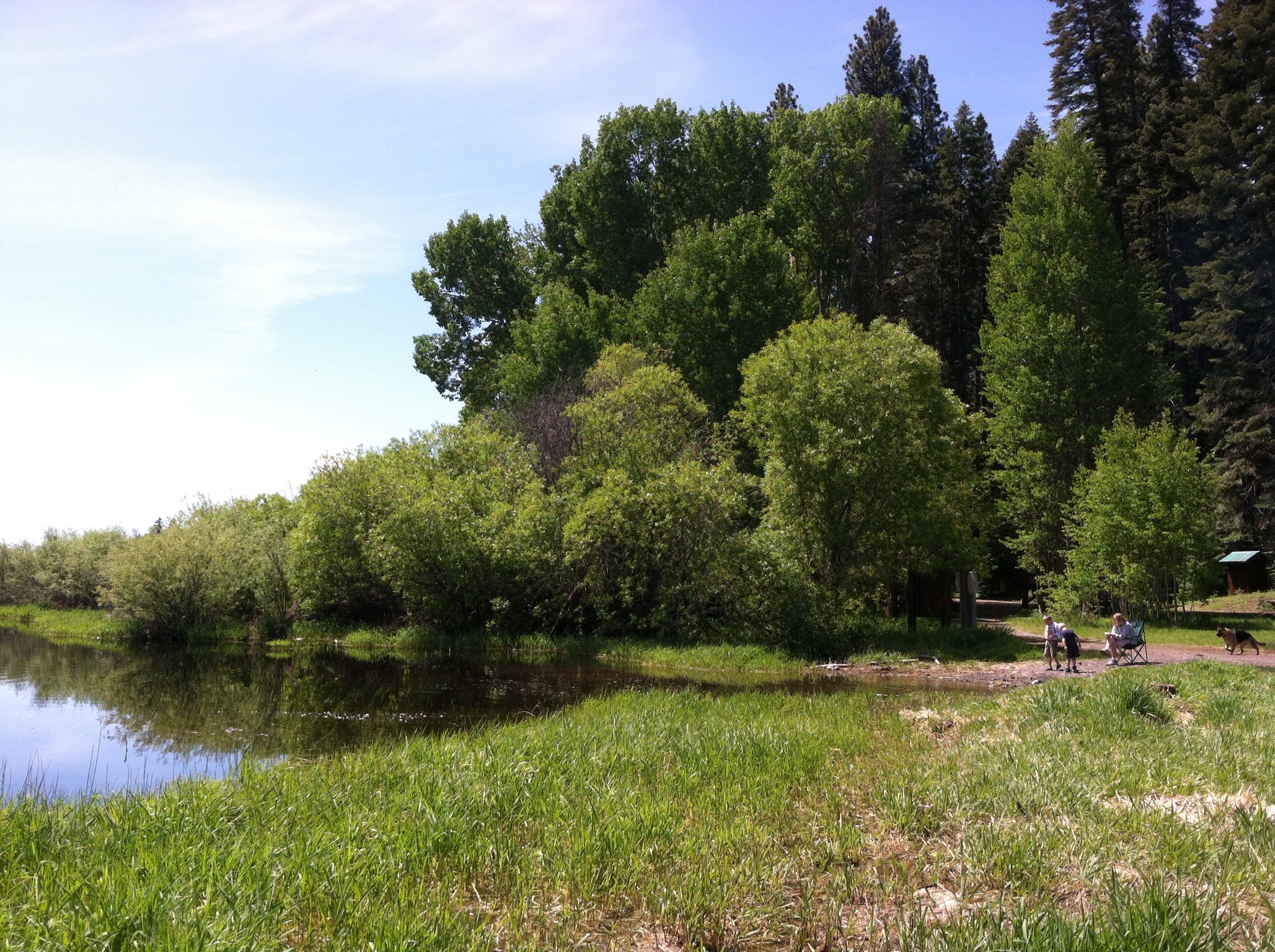
- Malone Springs, entering Upper Klamath Lake
- Interactive map of Malone Springs
- Location: Upper Klamath Lake, Oregon

Malone Springs is a watershed within the Fremont-Winema National Forest in Klamath County, Oregon, U.S. It is 25 miles (40 km) northwest of Klamath Falls on Oregon Route 140. It provides access to a multi-mile canoe route (and loop) along the westernmost edge of the Upper Klamath National Wildlife Refuge. Malone Springs' location allows for close encounters with the marsh of Upper Klamath Lake and views of old growth, mixed conifer forest on neighboring Pelican Butte immediately to the west.

The nearby campground offers camping, boating, fishing and wildlife viewing as well as an unimproved boat launch leading to the canoe trail.

== Canoe route ==
Malone Springs washes into a 15,000 acres (6,100 ha) marsh and wetland complex of the Upper Klamath National Wildlife Refuge. The Refuge is accessible by boat via the 9.5 miles (15.3 km) Upper Klamath Canoe Trail. Access points to the route are available by additional boat launches at Rocky Point and Crystalwood Lodge.

== Habitat ==
The west shoreline of Upper Klamath Lake and adjacent Agency Lake serves as a travel corridor for many nontropical migrant birds on their spring and fall migrations. Mature Ponderosa pine and Douglas fir forests come right to the edge of Upper Klamath Lake with small pockets of aspen, willow and cottonwood along the shoreline in some locations, which serve as nesting sites for bald eagles and osprey.
