= Lake of the Woods (Oregon) =

Lake in Oregon, United States

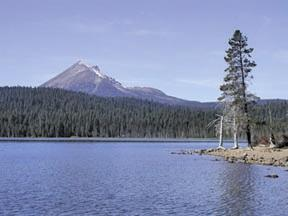
- Mount McLoughlin beyond Lake of the Woods

- Location within Oregon Location within the United States
- Location: Klamath County, Oregon, USA
- Coordinates: 42.36930°N 122.21570°W
- Type: Natural
- Catchment area: 26 square miles (67 km^{2})
- Max. length: 2.75 mi (4.43 km)
- Max. width: 3/4 mi (1.2 km)
- Surface area: 1,146 acres (464 ha)
- Average depth: 27 ft (8.2 m)
- Max. depth: 55 ft (17 m)
- Surface elevation: 4,949 ft (1,508 m)

Lake of the Woods is a natural lake near the crest of the Cascade Range in the Fremont–Winema National Forest in southern Oregon in the United States. The lake covers 1,146 acres (4.64 km^{2}). It was named by Oliver C. Applegate in 1870. Today, the Oregon Department of Fish and Wildlife manages the lake's fishery. The small unincorporated community of Lake of the Woods is located on the east shore of the lake. Lake of the Woods is one of southern Oregon's most popular outdoor recreation sites.

== History ==
Lake of the Woods was named by Oregon pioneer Oliver C. Applegate while he was building a road near the lake in 1870. Applegate also built a cabin at the south end of the lake, becoming the area's first resident.

Lake of the Woods became part of the Cascade Forest Reserve in 1898. The lake was managed as part of that Cascade Reserve until 1908, when the area was transferred to the Crater National Forest. The United States Forest Service issued the first residential use permit to the Elden cabin near Lake of the Woods in 1916. In 1920, the Forest Service built a public campground along the lake shore. The site was very popular, with 1,850 summer visitors recorded the first year it was open. In 1923, the road into the lake area was improved, and a second campground was built to accommodate the increasing number of recreational visitors. In 1926, the Forest Service issued a permit allowing the Lake of the Woods Recreation Company to build a resort at the lake.

In 1932, Lake of the Woods and the lakeside campgrounds were transferred to the Rogue River National Forest along with the surrounding forest. In the mid-1930s, the Civilian Conservation Corps began work at the Lake of the Woods Ranger Station at the north end of the lake. Civilian Conservation Corps crews built an office, residences, and a number of work buildings at the ranger station. All of the buildings except for the ranger station's barn were constructed in the National Park Service rustic architectural style. The Civilian Conservation Corps also expanded and improved the road network around the lake.

In 1937, there were 120 summer homes around Lake of the Woods. The next year, power lines brought electricity to the area for the first time. By 1948, the number of summer homes at the lake had grown to 200. There were also four organizational summer camps located around the lake. In 1951, the resort Lodge was destroyed in a fire, but was quickly rebuilt and reopened for business. The number of recreational visitors continued to increase throughout the 1950s, with as many as 5,000 people visiting the lake on some weekends. In 1958, Oregon Route 140 was completed, providing residents of Klamath Falls and Medford with easy access to the lake.

In 1961, the Forest Service transferred Lake of the Woods and the surrounding forest to the newly formed Winema National Forest. In 2002, the Winema National Forest was administratively combined with the Fremont National Forest, becoming the Fremont–Winema National Forest. Today, Lake of the Woods remains a very popular recreation site. The lake and surrounding forest is managed by the Klamath Ranger District, and its fishery is managed by the Oregon Department of Fish and Wildlife.

== Watershed ==
Lake of the Woods is located near the crest the Cascade Range in southern Oregon, 7 miles (11 km) southeast of Mount McLoughlin. Most of the lake water comes from groundwater seepage; however, there are also three tributary creeks. Rainbow Creek is a year-round tributary, while Billie Creek and Dry Creek have only seasonal flows. The lake's only outlet flows into Great Meadow, a wetland at the northeast end of the lake. Great Meadow drains into Seldom Creek, which flows into Upper Klamath Lake. Lake of the Woods only discharges water in the spring. During the drier summer and fall months, lake water is lost only through groundwater seepage and evaporation.

The watershed that drains into Lake of the Woods spans 26 square miles (67 km^{2}) and is covered by a mixed conifer forest that receives an average of 30–44 inches (760–1,120 mm) of precipitation annually. The primary tree species in the watershed are Douglas-fir and white fir. The watershed also has some ponderosa pine, lodgepole pine, and aspen. While logging and reforestation have affected forest composition, approximately 75 percent of the trees in the watershed are between 80 and 800 years old. As a result, much of the watershed is covered by a dense forest canopy.

== Lake environment ==
Lake of the Woods is a natural lake that covers 1,146 acres (4.64 km^{2}). It is approximately 2.75 miles (4.43 km) long and 0.75 miles (1.21 km) wide. The lake has an average depth of 27 feet (8.2 m) with a maximum depth of 55 feet (17 m) near the western shore. The water levels in Lake of the Woods only fluctuate about 2 feet (0.61 m) during a normal year. The surface water normally warms to the low 70s °F (low 20s °C) in the summer and freezes in the winter. The lake's bottom is 52 percent detritus, 19 percent sand, 15 percent vegetation, 11 percent rock, and 3 percent mud.

There have been a number of studies of lake's environment and water quality. Oregon State University published studies of the lake environment in 1972 and 1985. In 1992, Rogue Community College began monitoring water quality in the lake. Some of the parameters that are regularly tested include depth, temperature, pH, dissolved oxygen, transmissivity, turbidity, Secchi depth, chlorophyll, bacteria, total phosphorus, orthophosphate, alkalinity, and total dissolved solids. In 1996, the United States Geological Survey conducted a high-resolution acoustic survey and drilled sediment cores from the lake. In 2002, Portland State University reported the findings of volunteer monitors in their Lake Watch program. The monitors found some variation in the water transparency and seasonal patterns of hypolimnetic oxygen depletion. In 2004, the Fremont–Winema National Forest studied the impact of recreational residence permits on the lake environment. The assessment identified the early signs of shoreline erosion. While these studies produced some cautionary findings, taken overall, they indicate that the Lake of the Woods ecosystem is handling the stress of human use relatively well.

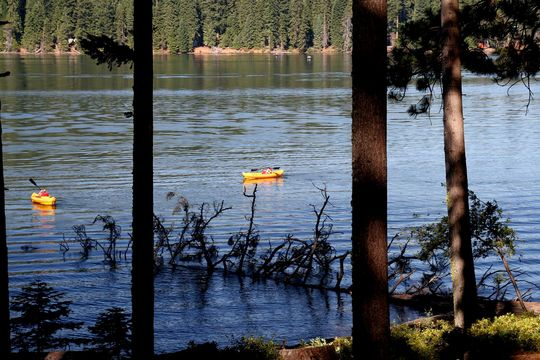
Fallen tree left to protect the lake shore

While the water quality in Lake of the Woods has not been significantly degraded by heavy recreational use, additional development could do so. To prevent this, the Forest Service began taking proactive steps to preserve the lake's water quality in the mid-1990s. These actions included closing some roads near the lake, funding a number of road drainage improvement projects, and initiating a soil conservation education program. The Forest Service also encourages cabin owners to install new septic systems and actively promotes the use of low-phosphate detergents in the Lake of the Woods community. It also created the Dry Creek Riparian Reserve to restrict development. When studies indicated that increasing use of motorized watercraft was contributing to shoreline erosion, the Forest Service amended Lake of the Woods recreational residence permits to require permit holders to plant native vegetation along the shoreline of the lake, and prohibited the removal of naturally fallen trees along the shoreline. So far, these measures have been successful in protecting the lake's water quality and minimizing shoreline erosion.

== Ecology ==
The lake's trophic state is in the oligotrophic to mesotrophic range. Due to a lack of historic data for Lake of the Woods, the natural previous conditions of the lake cannot be established.

The first fish survey at Lake of the Woods was conducted in 1941. However, the lake had been regularly stocked with non-native fish for many years before the survey, so it is impossible to know what fish species were native to the lake. In 1947, researchers from Oregon State University interviewed several people who had fished at the lake in the late 19th century, before any non-native fish were introduced into the lake. Based on those interviews, the researchers concluded that rainbow trout, tui chub, and possibly one or more sucker species may have been native to the lake. However, a University of Michigan study done for the Oregon Department of Fish and Wildlife concluded that there were no sucker species native to the lake. That report suggested that the Great Basin redband trout was probably the only species native to the lake.

Lake of the Woods was stocked for the first time in 1913. This introduced hatchery-breed rainbow trout into the lake. This stocking produced a decade of good trout fishing. In 1922, the Oregon State Game Commission (a predecessor to the Oregon Department of Fish and Wildlife) stocked the lake with largemouth bass, black crappie, bluegill, yellow perch, warmouth, pumpkinseed sunfish, brown bullheads, carp, and perhaps suckers. The yellow perch quickly became the lake's dominant species, out-competing the trout for both food and habitat. Between 1925 and 1935, brook trout, cutthroat trout, chinook salmon, coho salmon, and steelhead were also introduced into the lake. No additional rainbow trout were stocked until 1946. The trout population remained relatively stable until about 1938 when the salmonid populations began to decline, probably due to competition from the warm-water species combined with limited spawning areas and increasing fishing. Despite the Game Commission's efforts to control the warm-water species, their population continued to proliferate while the salmonid species declined. In 1955, the entire lake was poisoned with rotenone, killing all the fish in the lake. The lake was then restocked with rainbow trout, brook trout, and kokanee salmon.

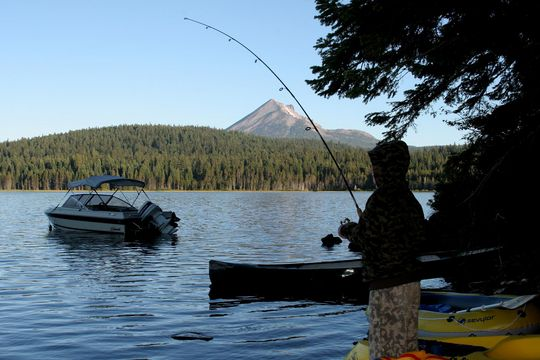
Fisherman near Aspen Point campground

Today, the Oregon Department of Fish and Wildlife manages the Lake of the Woods fishery. The agency has used both natural production and stocking to maintain and balance the fish populations. Brook trout, black crappie, brown bullheads, yellow perch, largemouth bass, blue chub, and tui chub have self-sustaining populations, while the kokanee salmon, brown trout, and rainbow trout populations are supplemented by stocking. The kokanee salmon caught in Lake of the Woods average 12 inches (300 mm); the brown trout average 14 inches (360 mm) to 19 inches (480 mm); and most rainbow trout are about 10 inches (250 mm), but a few reach up to 2 pounds.

In addition to fish, the lake provides habitat for a wide variety of bird species. From the Forest Service campgrounds along the lake shore, birdwatchers can see grebes, ducks, geese, and occasionally common loons. The lake also attracts birds of prey including osprey and bald eagles. In the forest around the lake, there are mountain chickadees, western tanagers, red-breasted nuthatch, yellow-rumped warbler, red crossbills, hermit thrush, golden-crowned kinglet, Steller's jays, Canada jays, Vaux's swifts, common nighthawk, hairy woodpeckers, downy woodpeckers, and pileated woodpeckers. The forest is also home to a number of owl species including great horned owls, great gray owls, northern spotted owls, northern saw-whet owls, and northern pygmy-owls.

The fir-dominated forest around Lake of the Woods is home to numerous mammals, both large and small. The large mammals include mule deer, black-tailed deer, elks, black bears, coyotes, bobcats, and cougars. Some of the small mammals include porcupines, western spotted skunks, striped skunks, martens, minks, long-tailed weasels, snowshoe hares, yellow-bellied marmots, golden-mantled ground squirrels, Douglas squirrels, dusky-footed woodrats, bushy-tailed woodrats, creeping voles, deer mice, and northern pocket gophers.

Each year in June, the Winema National Forest hosts a week-long summer resource management program for sixty high school students at Lake of the Woods. The participating students come from Oregon, Washington, and California. The Forest Service gives the attendees the opportunity to enjoy the outdoors while learning about the natural environment. Participants study geology, forestry, fisheries, and wildlife in various environments. They also learn about recreation management, wildfire control, wilderness stewardship, and cultural resources. At the end of the week, the students develop and present a land management plan to demonstrate what they learned.

== Recreation ==
Today, Lake of the Woods is a very popular recreation site. There are 218 summer homes around the lake. All of these homes require Forest Service recreational residence permits. There are two campgrounds with 124 campsites on the east shore of the lake. Aspen Point campground has 60 campsites, and Sunset campground has 64 campsites. There are also three day-use areas for swimming and picnicking. There are three organizational camps near the lake. A year-round resort provides two restaurants, a general store now open year round, a marina available for boat rentals and moorage in the summer, and 33 rental cabins.

During the summer, the lake is a popular place for swimming, fishing, canoeing, boating, and water skiing. There are also trails near the lake for hiking, biking, and horseback riding. In the winter, the lake is used for ice fishing. In 1998, the Forest Service estimated the lake hosted 320,000 recreational visitor days (one person staying at the lake for one day equals one visitor day). The nearby Great Meadows area is now a very popular winter recreation site, especially for snowmobile riders and cross-country skiers. The Forest Service estimated the area had 53,300 winter visitors in 2000. A private development near the lake will add 115 homes, increasing recreational use of the lake.

Lake of the Woods Resort is open for 12 months of the year. It offers 33 cabins and sites for 22 recreational vehicles. In 2011 the Resort took over management of the Forest Service campgrounds by the lake. The main lodge of the resort has a restaurant, general store and gift shop. The resort provides a full-service marina with a boat launch, moorages, boat rentals, and motorboat fuel available. There is also an automobile service station at the resort.

== Location ==
Lake of the Woods is located near the crest of the Cascade Mountains in western Klamath County, Oregon. Its elevation is 4,949 feet (1,508 m) above sea level. The lake is surrounded by the Fremont–Winema National Forest. Lake of the Woods is 33 miles (53 km) west of Klamath Falls and 43 miles (69 km) east of Medford. The small unincorporated community of Lake of the Woods, Oregon, is located on the east shore of the lake, approximately 1/2 mile (0.80 km) south of Oregon Route 140. There is a Forest Service visitor center at the historic Lake of the Woods Ranger Station at the north end of the lake, just off Route 140. The visitor center is open during the summer.

== See also ==
- List of lakes in Oregon

== Works cited ==
- Joslin, Les, "Lake of the Woods Ranger Station", Uncle Sam's Cabins, Wilderness Association, Bend, Oregon, 1995.
- McArthur, Lewis A. and Lewis L., "Lake of the Woods", Oregon Geographic Names (Seventh Edition), Oregon Historical Society Press, Portland, Oregon, 2003.
- Rose, Cathleen E. and M.S. Jesse Ford, "Land Use and Fisheries History in the Lake of the Woods Watershed" (PDF), Report for the Fremont-Winema National Forest by the Department of Fisheries and Wildlife, Oregon State University, Corvallis, Oregon, December 2004.
- Yuskavitch, Jim, "Lake of the Woods", Fishing Oregon: An Angler's Guide to Top Fishing Spots, Morris Book Publishing, Kearney, Nebraska, 2008.
