= Odessa, Oregon =

Unincorporated community in the state of Oregon, United States

- Unincorporated community
- Location within Oregon and the United States Odessa (the United States)
- Coordinates: 42°26′14″N 122°05′14″W
- Country: United States
- State: Oregon
- County: Klamath
- Elevation: 4,144 ft (1,263 m)
- Time zone: UTC-8 (Pacific (PST))
  - Summer (DST): UTC-7 (PDT)
- GNIS feature ID: 1165733
- Coordinates and elevation from Geographic Names Information System

Odessa is an unincorporated community in Klamath County, Oregon, United States. It is along Oregon Route 140 south of Rocky Point and about 25 miles (40 km) northwest of Klamath Falls. Odessa lies along the western shore of Upper Klamath Lake near the Fremont–Winema National Forest.

A post office operated in Odessa from 1902 through 1919. Blanche Griffith was one of the early postmasters. According to Oregon Geographic Names (OGN), in the late 1940s, Griffith said that the wife of her husband's brother named the community after a place in France. However, the OGN compiler thought it more likely that the name related to the city of Odesa in Ukraine.

The community was founded in the 1890s as a resort hotel and Indian trading post. Odessa Campground in the national forest is near Odessa.
