= Oregon Route 70 =

State highway in Klamath County, Oregon, US

Oregon Route 70
- Route 70 highlighted in red

Route information
- Maintained by ODOT
- Length: 6.97 mi (11.22 km)
- Existed: 1932–present

Major junctions
- West end: OR 140 in Dairy
- East end: Market Street and Central Street in Bonanza

Location
- Country: United States
- State: Oregon
- County: Klamath

Highway system
- Oregon Highways; Interstate; US; State; Named; Scenic
← OR 66	→ OR 74

Oregon Route 70 is an Oregon state highway that runs between the towns of Dairy, and Bonanza in south-central Oregon The highway is known as the Dairy-Bonanza Highway No. 23 (see Oregon highways and routes) and is signed east-to-west.

== Route description ==
Oregon Route 70 begins (at its western terminus) at an intersection with Oregon Route 140 in the town of Dairy. It heads east-southeast for seven miles (11 km), ending in the city of Bonanza.

== History ==
The Dairy-Bonanza Highway was established in 1917. When the Oregon route numbering system was introduced in 1932, the highway was assigned the number OR 70. There have been no major changes to the highway since its establishment.

== Major intersections ==
The entire route is in Klamath County.

Location	mi	km	Destinations	Notes
Dairy	0.00	0.00	OR 140 – Beatty, Lakeview, Olene, Klamath Falls	
Bonanza	6.47	10.41	Harpold Avenue to Poe Valley Road	
Bonanza	6.87	11.06	Langell Valley Road – Lorella	
Bonanza	6.97	11.22	Central Street, Market Street – Beatty, Lakeview	
1.000 mi = 1.609 km; 1.000 km = 0.621 mi
