= Yonna, Oregon =

Unincorporated community in the state of Oregon, United States

- Unincorporated community
- Location within Oregon Location within the United States
- Coordinates: 42°16′05″N 121°28′03″W
- Country: United States
- State: Oregon
- County: Klamath
- Elevation: 4,144 ft (1,263 m)
- Time zone: UTC-8 (Pacific (PST))
  - Summer (DST): UTC-7 (PDT)
- GNIS feature ID: 1161605

Yonna is an unincorporated community in Klamath County, Oregon, United States. It lies east of Oregon Route 140 in Yonna Valley, northeast of Dairy and near the base of Short Lake Mountain.

At one time known as Alkali Valley, the area is now known by its Klamath name, Yonna Valley. According to Oregon Geographic Names, the name may come from yana, meaning "below" as in the valley, or it may derived from yaina, meaning "mountain" There's also a local tradition that yonna in some tribal language means alkali, and so the change was made to avoid discouraging people who might otherwise want to settle there.

A post office was established in Yonna Valley in 1906. It closed in 1913.
