= Disappearance of Derrick Engebretson =

Unsolved 1998 disappearance of 8-year-old from Oregon

Derrick Engebretson
- Born: Derrick James Engebretson; July 5, 1990; Klamath Falls, Oregon, U.S.
- Disappeared: December 5, 1998 (aged 8); Rocky Point, Oregon, U.S.
- Status: Missing for 27 years, 10 months and 22 days
- Height: 4 ft 6 in (1.37 m)

Derrick James Engebretson (July 5, 1990 – disappeared December 5, 1998) is an American child who disappeared under mysterious circumstances in the Winema National Forest near Rocky Point, Oregon. On the evening of December 5, 1998, Engebretson vanished while searching for a Christmas tree with his father and grandfather, who realized they had lost sight of him in the late afternoon. Footprints and a snow angel near the road were found, but by the time law enforcement arrived that evening, a blizzard prevented immediate searches. Over the ensuing weeks, law enforcement and volunteer searchers continued to traverse the area, but no sign of Engebretson was found. Subsequent reports of a mysterious vehicle in the area that day were made. In October 1999, graffiti was discovered in a rural rest area bathroom south of Portland, which purportedly referred to Engebretson; the content of the graffiti was never made public. In 2008, it was revealed that Frank James Milligan, a convicted child rapist, was considered a potential suspect in Engebretson's disappearance. As of 2026, Engebretson's whereabouts remain unknown.

== Disappearance ==
On December 5, 1998, eight-year-old Derrick Engebretson traveled to Pelican Butte with his father and grandfather near Rocky Point, Oregon, roughly 30 miles (48 km) from Klamath Falls and immediately south of Crater Lake National Park. The three had planned to look for a Christmas tree. At some point during the excursion, Engebretson wandered away from his father and grandfather. He was reported missing that evening by his father and grandfather, who notified a passing motorist around 4:13 p.m.; the motorist traveled to a nearby resort approximately 2 miles (3.2 km) away, where he placed a phone call to 9-1-1.

== Investigation ==
Law enforcement discovered a "crude shelter" made of fir boughs beneath several fallen logs near the area Engebretson went missing, but search dogs were unable to detect his scent there. Due to the extreme conditions of the area, law enforcement speculated he would have quickly succumbed to the elements. Engebretson's parents stated that their son had "grown up in the mountains" and was used to walking distances of 20 miles (32 km) in steep terrain. In the hours immediately after Engebretson's disappearance, his family and law enforcement discovered small footprints in the snow, which made a loop from the location where his father had last seen him to a clearing near the road, where a snow angel presumably left by Engebretson was found. A snowplow had obliterated the tracks that led away from the snow angel, and no additional footprints were found. Several pieces of chopped wood were also discovered nearby; when he disappeared, Engebretson had a small hatchet with him and was dressed in a snowsuit. In the late evening, a blizzard hit the area, hampering search efforts.

Initial searches were completed by foot with search canines, as well as aerial searches using a Civil Air Patrol plane and an Air Force Reserve helicopter. Several relatives also undertook independent searches. On December 13, 1998, eight days into the investigation, Klamath County Police suspended their search. Engebretson's family continued independent search efforts and camped at the site in a donated camper van over the following two weeks, while hundreds of volunteers continued to organize search efforts. On December 18, further search efforts were terminated due to subzero temperatures, which made it unsafe for anyone to travel through the area. In the ensuing months more than 10,000 hours were spent performing ground searches.

Early in the investigation, a witness claimed to have seen an unidentified man struggling with a young boy in the area later during the day Engebretson disappeared. The witness ignored the event as they had assumed the man was the boy's father. Additional reports were made of an unidentified man driving a two-door Honda asking passersby for directions in the forest that day.

== Subsequent events ==
On September 24, 1999, graffiti was discovered in a bathroom at the Sagehen Rest Area, approximately 300 miles (480 km) south of Portland, that law enforcement identified as being referential to Engebretson's disappearance. Engebretson's parents drove to view the graffiti upon being notified, and his mother, Lori, stated to the press: "I think it's just a big, sick joke. I thought, if somebody would have had Derrick, if they put this on the wall, they were wanting to be caught. If they were wanting to be caught, why didn't they leave something of Derrick's there?" The contents of the graffiti were not made public.

In 2008, it was confirmed that Frank James Milligan, a man serving a sentence for raping a 10-year-old boy in Dallas, Oregon, was considered a potential suspect in Engebretson's disappearance.

== See also ==
- List of people who disappeared mysteriously: post-1970
