= Engebretson =

Engebretson is a surname. Notable people with the surname include:

- Burger M. Engebretson (1896–1981), American politician
- Derrick Engebretson (born 1990), American missing child
- George Engebretson (1890–1961), American politician
- Heather Engebretson (born 1990), American lyric soprano
- Julius M. Engebretson (1864–1937), American politician and businessman
- Mark Engebretson (born 1964), American saxophonist and composer
