= Oregon Highway 23 =

Oregon Highway 23 may refer to:

- For the former OR 23, see Oregon Route 23.
- For the unsigned Highway 23, see Dairy-Bonanza Highway.
- For the former unsigned Highway 23, see Klamath-Crater Lake Highway.
