= Klamath Falls City School District =

School district in Oregon, United States

Address
- 1336 Avalon Street Klamath Falls, Oregon, 97603; United States

District information
- Type: Public
- Grades: PreK–12
- NCES District ID: 4107080

Students and staff
- Students: 2,770
- Teachers: 141.88 (FTE)
- Staff: 246.4 (FTE)
- Student–teacher ratio: 19.52

Other information
- Website: www.kfalls.k12.or.us

Klamath Falls City School District is a public school district located in Klamath Falls, Oregon, United States.

The district includes the majority of the Klamath Falls city limits, the Running Y Ranch census-designated place, and a portion of the Altamont CDP.

== Demographics ==
In the 2009 school year, the district had 249 students classified as homeless by the Department of Education, or 6.3% of students in the district.

== Schools ==
=== High schools ===
- Klamath Union High School
- Klamath Learning Center
- Pelican Transition (SPED students ages 18-21)
- Eagle Ridge High School (charter school)

=== Middle school ===
- Ponderosa Middle School

=== Elementary schools ===
- Conger Elementary
- Mills Elementary
- Pelican Elementary
- Roosevelt Elementary
- Klamath Home Learning Academy

== See also ==
- List of school districts in Oregon
