= Lenz, Klamath County, Oregon =

Unincorporated community in Oregon, US

- Unincorporated community
- Location within Oregon and the United States Lenz (the United States)
- Coordinates: 42°56′16″N 121°49′11″W
- Country: United States
- State: Oregon
- County: Klamath
- Elevation: 4,554 ft (1,388 m)
- Time zone: UTC-8 (Pacific (PST))
  - Summer (DST): UTC-7 (PDT)
- GNIS feature ID: 1144950

Lenz is an unincorporated community in Klamath County, Oregon, United States on U.S. Route 97, directly east of Crater Lake and 20 miles (32 km) south of Chemult. This station on the Cascade Line of the Southern Pacific Railroad was named after Charles A. Lenz, who settled in the area before the turn of the 20th century. The elevation is 4554 feet (1388 m).
