= Oregon Route 273 =

State highway in Jackson County, Oregon, US

Oregon Route 273
- Route 273 highlighted in red

Route information
- Maintained by ODOT
- Length: 12.42 mi (19.99 km)
- Existed: 2003–present

Major junctions
- South end: I-5 near Ashland
- I-5 near Ashland
- North end: OR 66 near Ashland

Location
- Country: United States
- State: Oregon
- County: Jackson

Highway system
- Oregon Highways; Interstate; US; State; Named; Scenic
← OR 260	→ OR 281

Oregon Route 273 is an Oregon state highway running from OR 66 near Ashland to Interstate 5 near the California state line. OR 273 is known as the Siskiyou Highway No. 273 (see Oregon highways and routes). It is 12.42 miles (19.99 km) long and runs north–south parallel of I-5, entirely within Jackson County.

OR 273 was established in 2003 as part of Oregon's project to assign route numbers to highways that previously were not assigned.

== Route description ==
OR 273 begins at an intersection with OR 66 approximately four miles southeast of Ashland and heads south, intersecting with I-5 at I-5 Exit 6 and continuing to I-5 Exit 1, where it ends.

== History ==
OR 273 is an old section of US 99. OR 273 was assigned to the Siskiyou Highway in 2003.

== Major intersections ==
The entire route is in Jackson County.

Location	mi	km	Destinations	Notes
Cascade–Siskiyou National Monument	12.42	19.99	I-5 south – Yreka	I-5 exit 1 northbound; southbound exit & northbound entrance only.
	6.70	10.78	I-5 – Ashland, Yreka	I-5 exit 6.
	0.00	0.00	OR 66 – Ashland, Klamath Falls	
1.000 mi = 1.609 km; 1.000 km = 0.621 mi: Incomplete access
