= Oregon Shores, Oregon =

- Census-designated place
- Location within Oregon Location within the United States
- Coordinates: 42°32′15″N 121°55′18″W
- Country: United States
- State: Oregon
- County: Klamath

Area
  - Total: 1.31 sq mi (3.39 km^{2})
  - Land: 1.10 sq mi (2.86 km^{2})
  - Water: 0.20 sq mi (0.53 km^{2})
- Elevation: 4,252 ft (1,296 m)

Population (2020)
  - Total: 330
  - Density: 298.9/sq mi (115.42/km^{2})
- Time zone: UTC-8 (Pacific (PST))
  - Summer (DST): UTC-7 (PDT)
- ZIP Code: 97624 (Chiloquin)
- Area codes: 541/458
- FIPS code: 41-55268
- GNIS feature ID: 2812879

Oregon Shores is a census-designated place (CDP) in Klamath County, Oregon, United States. As of the 2020 census, Oregon Shores had a population of 330. It was first listed as a CDP prior to the 2020 census.

The CDP is in central Klamath County, on the eastern shore of Agency Lake. It is 2 miles (3 km) west of the junction of U.S. Route 97 with Oregon Route 62 (Crater Lake Highway), and it is 24 miles (39 km) north of Klamath Falls, the county seat.

== Demographics ==
Historical population
Census	Pop.	Note	%±
2020	330		—
U.S. Decennial Census

== Education ==
It is within the Klamath County School District.

It is in the territory of Klamath Community College.
