= Lake of the Woods, Oregon =

Unincorporated community in the state of Oregon, United States

Lake of the Woods
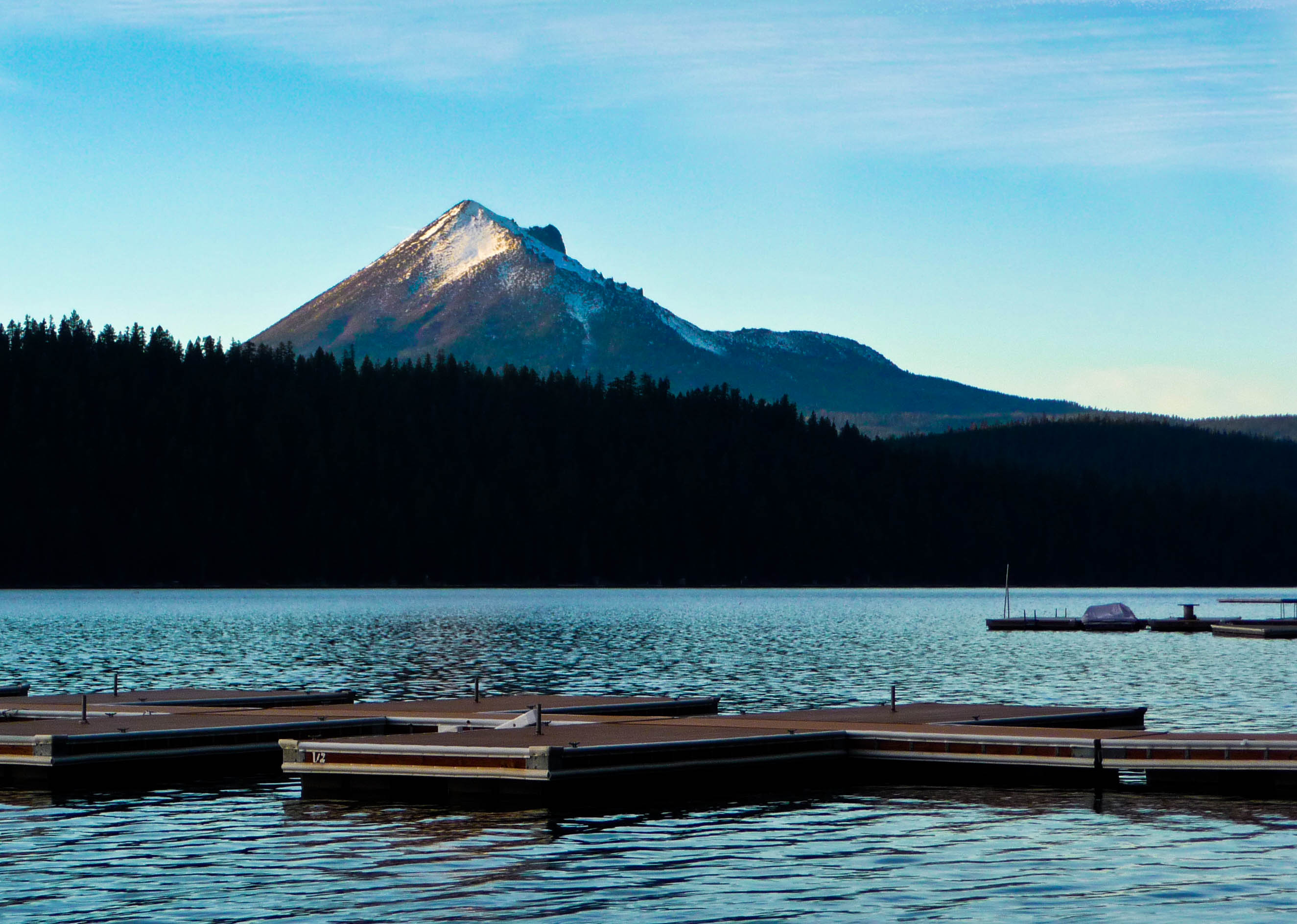
- Boat dock at Lake of the Woods
- Interactive map of Lake of the Woods
- Coordinates: 42°22′43″N 122°12′44″W
- Country: United States
- State: Oregon
- County: Klamath
- Elevation: 4,977 ft (1,517 m)
- Time zone: UTC-8 (Pacific)
  - Summer (DST): UTC-7 (Pacific)
- ZIP code: 97603
- GNIS feature ID: 1161411

Lake of the Woods is an unincorporated community in Klamath County, Oregon, United States. It is located on the east shore of the lake of the same name within the Winema National Forest, about a mile south of Oregon Route 140.

The lake was named by Oliver C. Applegate in 1870, while he was building a road around its perimeter. Applegate also built a cabin at the south end of the lake that year. A post office named Lake of the Woods was established at the north end of the lake in 1930, but it only ran until 1931. Efforts were made to establish the form "Lake O' Woods" in the late 1930s, and a post office with that name was established in 1941 that ran intermittently until 1965. In 1961, the United States Board on Geographic Names ruled to return to the original name for the lake and the community. A post office was reestablished in 1970 with the name "Lake of the Woods"; it closed for good 1977.

The lake, with Mount McLoughlin in the background, is a popular recreation area.
