= Running Y Ranch, Oregon =

- Census-designated place
- Location within Oregon Location within the United States
- Coordinates: 42°16′42″N 121°53′02″W
- Country: United States
- State: Oregon
- County: Klamath

Area
  - Total: 5.36 sq mi (13.88 km^{2})
  - Land: 4.75 sq mi (12.30 km^{2})
  - Water: 0.61 sq mi (1.58 km^{2})
- Elevation: 4,213 ft (1,284 m)

Population (2020)
  - Total: 858
  - Density: 180.7/sq mi (69.76/km^{2})
- Time zone: UTC-8 (Pacific (PST))
  - Summer (DST): UTC-7 (PDT)
- ZIP Code: 97601 (Klamath Falls)
- Area codes: 541/458
- FIPS code: 41-64282
- GNIS feature ID: 2805460

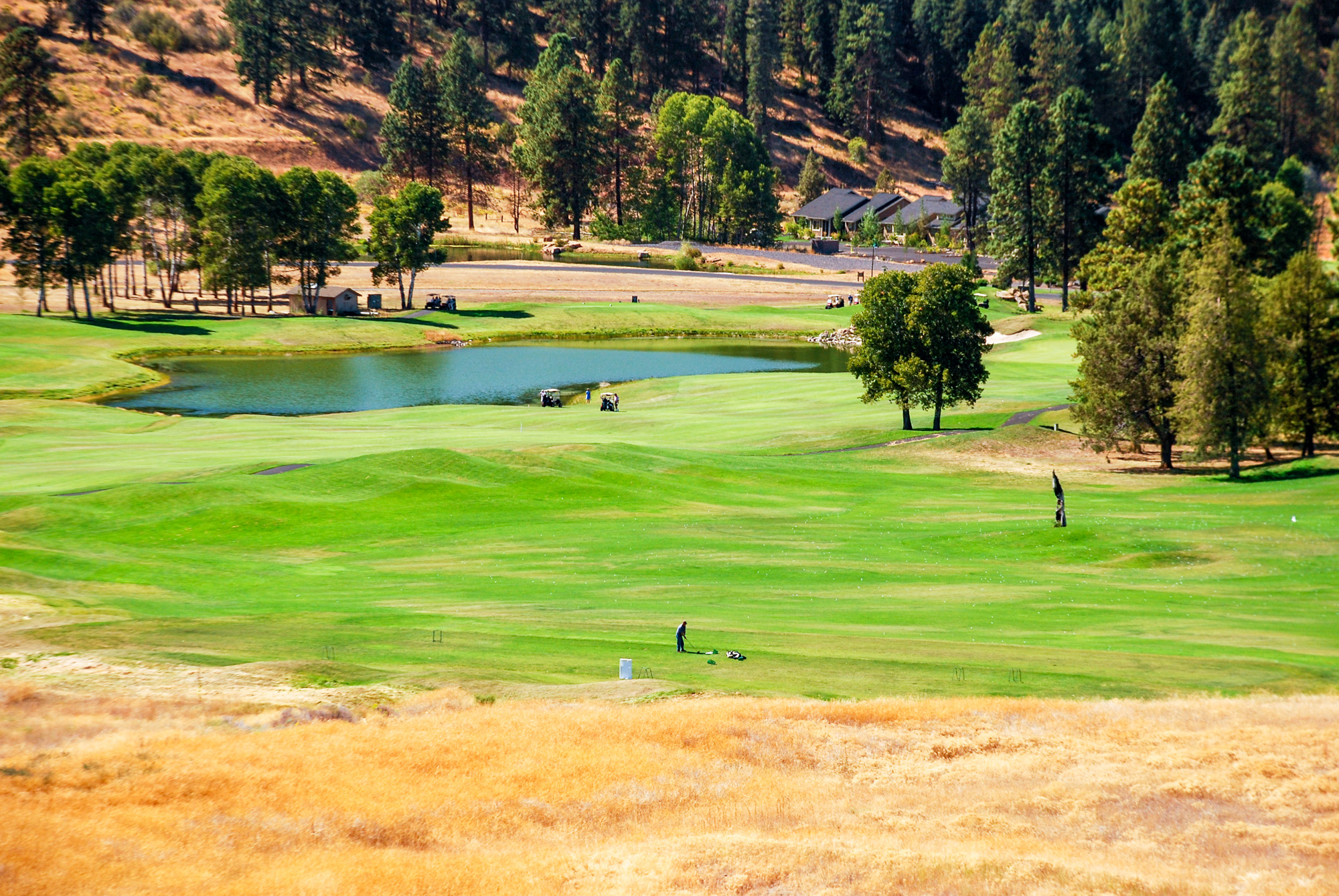
Golf course at Running Y Ranch

Running Y Ranch is a census-designated place (CDP) in Klamath County, Oregon, United States. Occupying the lands of Running Y Ranch Resort, a planned community, it was first listed as a CDP prior to the 2020 census. As of the 2020 census, Running Y Ranch had a population of 858.

The CDP is in southwestern Klamath County, on a cluster of hills between Upper Klamath Lake to the northeast, Wocus Marsh to the southwest, and Caledonia Marsh to the northwest. Payne Canyon, in the center of the hills, is the site of the Running Y Ranch Golf Course. The community is 8 miles (13 km) northwest of Klamath Falls, the county seat.

== Demographics ==
Historical population
Census	Pop.	Note	%±
2020	858		—
U.S. Decennial Census

== Education ==
It is within the Klamath Falls City School District.

It is in the territory of Klamath Community College.
