= Doherty Slide =

Landform in Lake County, Oregon, U.S.

Coordinates: 42.036836°N 119.483265°W

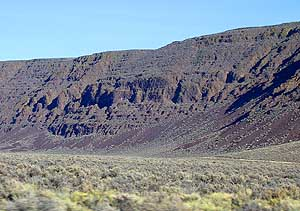
The Doherty Slide, viewed from Oregon Route 140, looking northeast. The floor of the Guano Valley is shown in the foreground.

The Doherty Slide, also known as Doherty Rim, is a prominent dissected rim of volcanic origin located in southeastern Oregon in the United States. It is located in rural Lake County, just north of the Nevada border. The ridge sits at the eastern end of the Guano Valley, approximately 20 miles (32 km) east of the town of Adel.

The ridge was formed by lava extrusions and has been subsequently eroded to produce the present rim. The term "slide" likely refers to the large amount of eroded material along the base of the ridge, which rises approximately 1000 ft (300 m) from the valley floor on the western side. The eastern side is a plateau that stretches eastward through southeastern Oregon. Oregon Route 140 climbs the face of the slide.
