= Malone, Oregon =

Unincorporated community in the state of Oregon, United States

- Unincorporated community
- Location within Oregon Location within the United States
- Coordinates: 42°01′11″N 121°33′34″W
- Country: United States
- State: Oregon
- County: Klamath
- Elevation: 4,065 ft (1,239 m)
- Time zone: UTC-8 (Pacific (PST))
  - Summer (DST): UTC-7 (PDT)
- ZIP code: 97633
- Area codes: 458 and 541
- GNIS feature ID: 1136510

Malone is an unincorporated community in Klamath County, Oregon, United States. It is on Oregon Route 39 east of Merrill near the California border.
