= Upper Klamath National Wildlife Refuge =

Wildlife refuge in Washington, USA

- IUCN category IV (habitat/species management area)
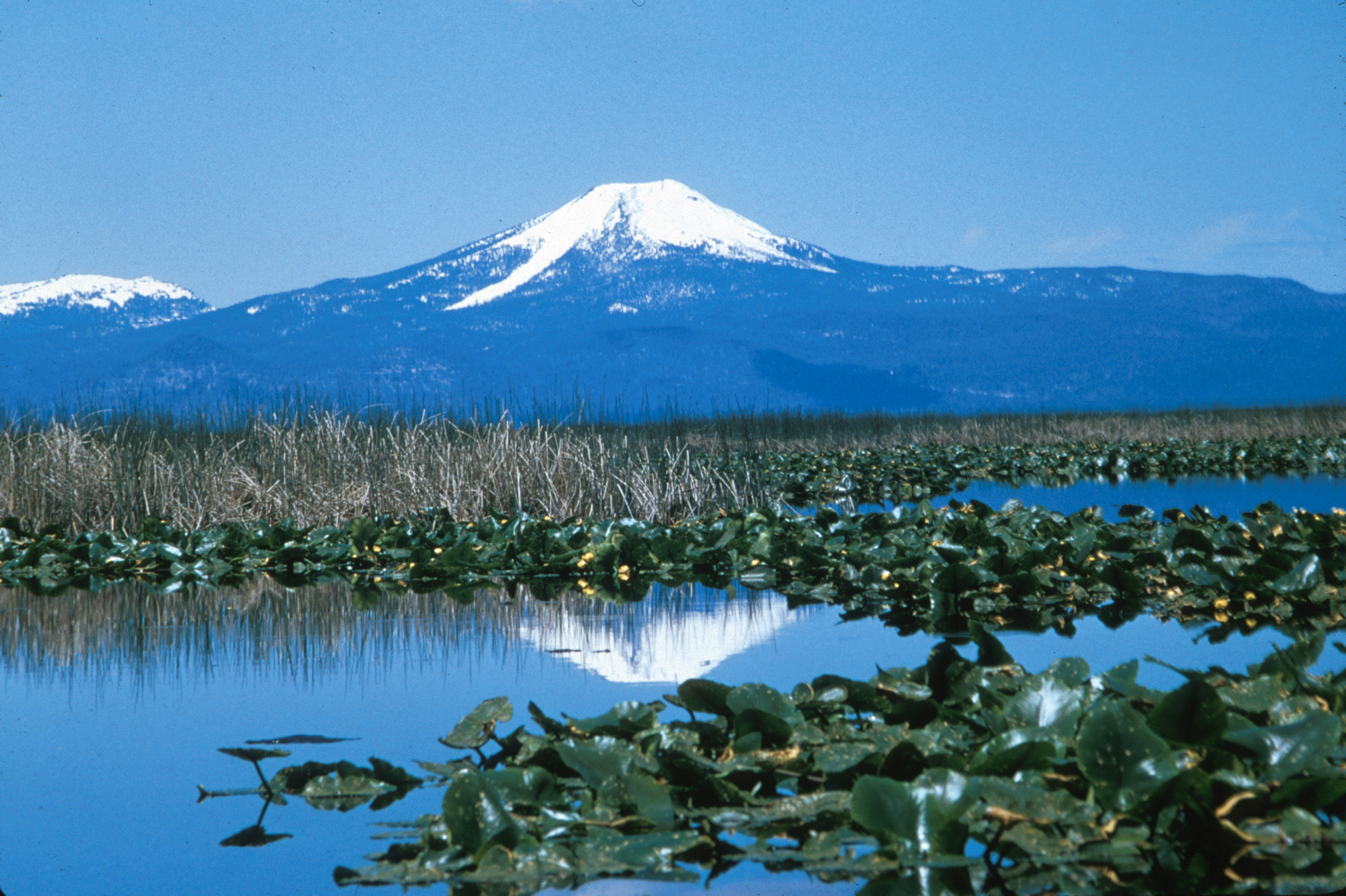
- The Upper Klamath National Wildlife Refuge

- Location within Oregon
- Location: Klamath County, Oregon
- Nearest city: Klamath Falls
- Coordinates: 42.508333°N 122.041667°W
- Area: 14,400 acres (5,800 ha)
- Established: 1928
- Governing body: U.S. Fish and Wildlife Service
- Website: Upper Klamath NWR

The Upper Klamath National Wildlife Refuge is a wildlife refuge in southwestern Klamath County on the shores of Upper Klamath Lake in Oregon. It was established in 1928 and contains some 14,400 acres (5,800 ha) of freshwater marshes. It is accessible only by boat from Rocky Point Resort and Rocky Point boat launch, Malone springs, and a few neighboring ramps. The refuge is part of the Klamath Basin National Wildlife Refuge Complex and is administered along with the other refuges of the complex from common offices in Tulelake, California.
