= Pelican City, Oregon =

Unincorporated community in the state of Oregon, United States

- Unincorporated community
- Location within Oregon Location within the United States
- Coordinates: 42°15′12″N 121°47′50″W
- Country: United States
- State: Oregon
- County: Klamath
- Elevation: 4,229 ft (1,289 m)
- Time zone: UTC-8 (Pacific (PST))
  - Summer (DST): UTC-7 (PDT)
- GNIS feature ID: 1136619

Pelican City is an unincorporated community in Klamath County in the U.S. state of Oregon. It lies along U.S. Route 97 just north of the city of Klamath Falls near the south end of Upper Klamath Lake and the upstream end of the Link River.

The community is named after the Pelican Bay Lumber Company, which had a mill here. Pelican Bay is part of the same lake but at its far northwest end.
