= Lorella, Oregon =

Unincorporated community in the state of Oregon, United States

- Unincorporated community
- Location within Oregon Location within the United States
- Coordinates: 42°08′14″N 121°16′21″W
- Country: United States
- State: Oregon
- County: Klamath
- Elevation: 4,183 ft (1,275 m)
- Time zone: UTC-8 (Pacific (PST))
  - Summer (DST): UTC-7 (PDT)
- ZIP code: 97623
- Area codes: 458 and 541
- GNIS feature ID: 1123481

Lorella, formerly Haynesville, is an unincorporated community in Klamath County, Oregon, United States. It lies southeast of Bonanza along East Langell Valley Road. The Lost River flows through the Langell Valley and near Lorella.

It became known as Lorella, for a local resident, on December 13, 1894, shortly after the establishment of a post office on August 3, 1887. Joseph K. Haynes was first postmaster. The office closed in March 1930.
