= Bonanza, Oregon =

- City
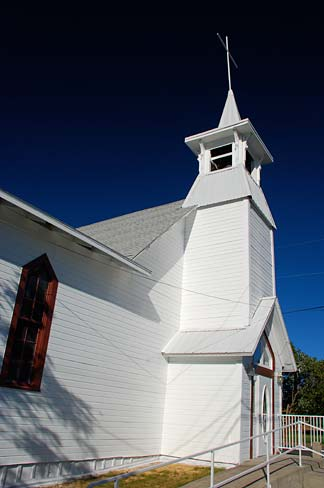
- The Living Springs Fellowship Church in Bonanza

- Location in Oregon
- Coordinates: 42°12′01″N 121°24′24″W
- Country: United States
- State: Oregon
- County: Klamath
- Incorporated: 1901

Area
  - Total: 0.82 sq mi (2.12 km^{2})
  - Land: 0.82 sq mi (2.12 km^{2})
  - Water: 0 sq mi (0.00 km^{2})
- Elevation: 4,141 ft (1,262 m)

Population (2020)
  - Total: 404
  - Density: 492.8/sq mi (190.29/km^{2})
- Time zone: UTC-8 (Pacific)
  - Summer (DST): UTC-7 (Pacific)
- ZIP code: 97623
- Area code: 541
- FIPS code: 41-07300
- GNIS feature ID: 2411707
- Website: townofbonanza.com

Bonanza is a city in Klamath County, Oregon, United States, near Klamath Falls. The population was 415 at the 2010 census.

== Geography ==
Bonanza is at an elevation of 4,127 feet (1,258 m) in southern Klamath County near the Oregon–California border. The town is at the east end of Oregon Route 70, a spur off Oregon Route 140. By highway, Bonanza is about 21 miles (34 km) from Klamath Falls and 300 miles (483 km) from Portland.

The Lost River flows through Bonanza. According to the United States Census Bureau, the town has a total area of 0.82 square miles (2.12 km^{2}), all of it land.

=== Climate ===
This region experiences warm (but not hot) and dry summers, with no average monthly temperatures above 71.6 °F (22.0 °C). According to the Köppen Climate Classification system, Bonanza has a warm-summer Mediterranean climate, abbreviated Csb on climate maps.

== History ==
The town, in a farming district, was named after the Spanish word for 'prosperity' (lit.: 'smooth sea'), apparently because of the good springs found nearby. The Bonanza post office was established in 1875.

J. P. Roberts founded the community in 1876 and opened a store there. Bonanza was formally platted in 1878. By around 1900, it was considered the third most important town in Klamath County, after Klamath Falls and Merrill. Daily mail arrived by stagecoach. The chief products of the region were cattle, horses, grain, hay, fruits, and vegetables.

Bonanza is an agricultural community with large areas of alfalfa, cattle, and dairy farm use. The Lost River runs near downtown where the Bonanza Big Springs are located. Low water levels have caused groundwater contamination through the springs and added to the regional controversies over water use, endangered suckers (fish) and struggling salmon species, and farming.

== Economy ==
As of 2003, the four largest employers in Bonanza were the Klamath County School District, Bonanza View Dairy, Tom DeJong Dairy, and Haskins Potato.

== Education ==
It is within the Klamath County School District. The community is home to the Bonanza School, which includes all grades from kindergarten through 12.

It is in the territory of Klamath Community College.

== Demographics ==
Historical population
Census	Pop.	Note	%±
1880	100		—
1900	118		—
1910	250		111.9%
1920	77		−69.2%
1930	141		83.1%
1940	233		65.2%
1950	259		11.2%
1960	297		14.7%
1970	230		−22.6%
1980	270		17.4%
1990	323		19.6%
2000	415		28.5%
2010	415		0.0%
2020	404		−2.7%
Source: U.S. Decennial Census

=== 2010 census ===
As of the census of 2010, there were 415 people, 152 households, and 108 families residing in the town. The population density was 506.1 inhabitants per square mile (195.4/km^{2}). There were 169 housing units at an average density of 206.1 per square mile (79.6/km^{2}). The racial makeup of the town was 86.3% White, 0.2% African American, 0.5% Native American, 9.6% from other races, and 3.4% from two or more races. Hispanic or Latino of any race were 27.7% of the population.

There were 152 households, of which 39.5% had children under the age of 18 living with them, 54.6% were married couples living together, 11.2% had a female householder with no husband present, 5.3% had a male householder with no wife present, and 28.9% were non-families. 23.0% of all households were made up of individuals, and 11.9% had someone living alone who was 65 years of age or older. The average household size was 2.73 and the average family size was 3.25.

The median age in the town was 34.5 years. 30.4% of residents were under the age of 18; 7.2% were between the ages of 18 and 24; 26.3% were from 25 to 44; 21.9% were from 45 to 64; and 14.2% were 65 years of age or older. The gender makeup of the town was 51.6% male and 48.4% female.

=== 2000 census ===
As of the census of 2000, there were 415 people, 139 households, and 102 families residing in the town. The population density was 497.8 inhabitants per square mile (192.2/km^{2}). There were 152 housing units at an average density of 182.3 per square mile (70.4/km^{2}). The racial makeup of the town was 85.54% White, 0.48% African American, 0.96% Native American, 0.24% Asian, 0.72% Pacific Islander, 5.54% from other races, and 6.51% from two or more races. About 13 percent of the population were Latino of any race.

There were 139 households, out of which 37.4% had children under the age of 18 living with them, 59.0% were married couples living together, 13.7% had a female householder with no husband present, 25.9% were non-families, 22.3% of all households were made up of individuals, and 9.4% had someone living alone who was 65 years of age or older. The average household size was 2.99 and the average family size was 3.40.

The age distribution was 34.9% under the age of 18, 7.7% from 18 to 24, 25.1% from 25 to 44, 20.5% from 45 to 64, and 11.8% who were 65 years of age or older. The median age was 31 years. For every 100 females, there were 99.5 males. For every 100 females age 18 and over, there were 92.9 males.

The median income for a household in the town was $31,944, and the median income for a family was $36,786. Males had a median income of $21,979 versus $18,750 for females. The per capita income for the town was $10,213. About 14.7% of families and 16.8% of the population were below the poverty line, including 21.9% of those under age 18 and 11.9% of those age 65 or over.

== Notable people ==
- Dennis Linthicum, state senator
- Ryan Stevenson, American musician
- Hans-Georg Gottfried Dittmann, award-winning German-Austrian journalist; exchange student in 1996–97
