= Eagle Ridge High School =

Coordinates: 42°13′24″N 121°46′38″W

Location
- 677 South 7th St; Klamath Falls, Oregon 97601

Information
- Teaching staff: 6.00 (FTE)
- Grades: 9-12
- Enrollment: 129 (2023-2024)
- Student to teacher ratio: 21.50
- Website: www.kfalls.k12.or.us/o/ernths

Eagle Ridge High School is a charter school in Klamath Falls, Oregon
