= Rocky Point, Oregon =

Unincorporated community in the state of Oregon, United States

- Census-designated place
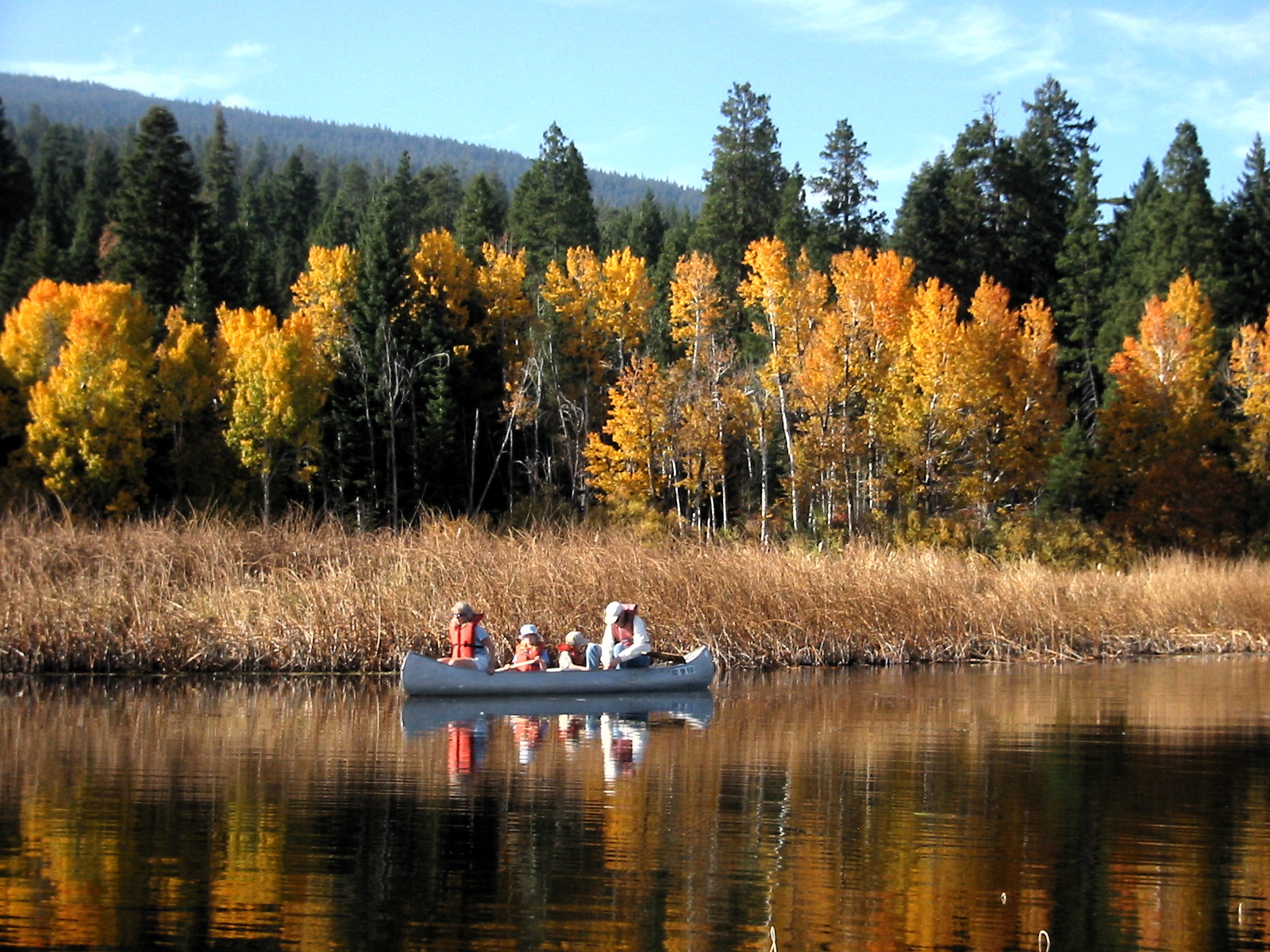
- Upper Klamath Lake Canoe Trail near Rocky Point

- Location within Oregon Location within the United States
- Coordinates: 42°26′01″N 122°07′15″W
- Country: United States
- State: Oregon
- County: Klamath
- Elevation: 4,226 ft (1,288 m)
- GNIS feature ID: 2805459

Rocky Point is a census-designated place in Klamath County, Oregon, United States. As of the 2020 census, Rocky Point had a population of 310. It is on Pelican Bay on the west shore of Upper Klamath Lake, about 29 miles (47 km) northwest of Klamath Falls and about 3 miles (5 km) north of Oregon Route 140 on Forest Highway 34 (Westside Road or Klamath County Highway 531). It is within the Winema National Forest.

== History ==
Rocky Point has long been the site of a lakeside fishing resort of summer-only residents starting in the late 19th century, including wealthy San Franciscans, such as Herbert Fleishhacker. The first post office in the area was named Pelican; it was established in 1888 and stayed open until 1907. Another post office in the area was called Lawrentz after Martha A. Lawrentz, the postmaster; it ran from 1894 to 1895. The Recreation post office ran from 1913 until February 11, 1924, when the name was changed to Pelican Bay. The name was changed to Rocky Point on June 30, 1924. Rocky Point post office ran until 1947, when the name was changed to Harriman, after railroad magnate Edward H. Harriman, who kept a summer camp in the area for several years. Harriman post office closed in 1954.

Harriman Springs Resort was purchased by Edward Harriman in 1906. It was first named the Pelican Bay Lodge, built in 1889, and renamed Harriman Lodge by Edward Harriman. The original lodge burned in 1942 and was rebuilt in 1953. Among Harriman's guests was naturalist John Muir. Harriman Springs and Rocky Point Resort was purchased and ran by Claude and Betty Marshall of Rogue River Oregon in 1986 and changed hands several more times before later being closed to the public in the late 1990s. The Point Comfort Lodge (also known as the White Pelican Inn) is a National Register of Historic Places-listed hotel built in 1912. Local residents say that the place was famous for its "galloping goats", which is a euphemism for a brothel. The Rocky Point Resort was founded in the 1880s when the area was known as Leavitt's Point. In 1910 steamboats would travel to Rocky Point from Klamath Falls where they would meet the Crater Lake automobile stage line, which transported passengers to complete the trip to Crater Lake overland. Klamath Lake continued to be a favorite summer retreat for San Francisco's upper class through the 1930s.

Along with tourism, logging was once an important part of the area's economy, starting in the early 1900s. There was a sawmill in nearby Odessa that operated for several years. Today large-scale logging operations no longer occur in the federally managed timberlands of the region.

== Recreation ==
The Upper Klamath Canoe Trail is accessed at Rocky Point. The 9.5-mile (15.3 km) trail through a freshwater marsh is maintained by the Fish and Wildlife Service as part of the Klamath Basin National Wildlife Refuge Complex. There is a boat launch, a boat dock and a fishing dock at Rocky Point, all of which are barrier-free, and boat rentals are available at Rocky Point Resort.

== Climate ==
This region experiences warm (but not hot) and dry summers, with no average monthly temperatures above 71.6 °F. According to the Köppen Climate Classification system, Rocky Point has a warm-summer Mediterranean climate, abbreviated "Csb" on climate maps.

== Education ==
It is within the Klamath County School District.

It is in the territory of Klamath Community College.

== See also ==
- Malone Springs
