= Pine Ridge, Oregon =

Unincorporated community in the state of Oregon, United States

Coordinates: 42°35′38″N 121°51′42″W

Pine Ridge was a company town located on the Klamath Indian Reservation, about a mile and a half north of Chiloquin, Oregon.

Wilbur Knapp built a small sawmill on the site in 1916 for Modoc Lumber Company, as well as a few houses. The area was originally known as "Aspgrove." In 1924 the mill was sold to the Forest Lumber Company from Kansas City, who built a large mill and changed the name to Pine Ridge. After Forest Lumber Company bought the property, houses were built to a higher standard.

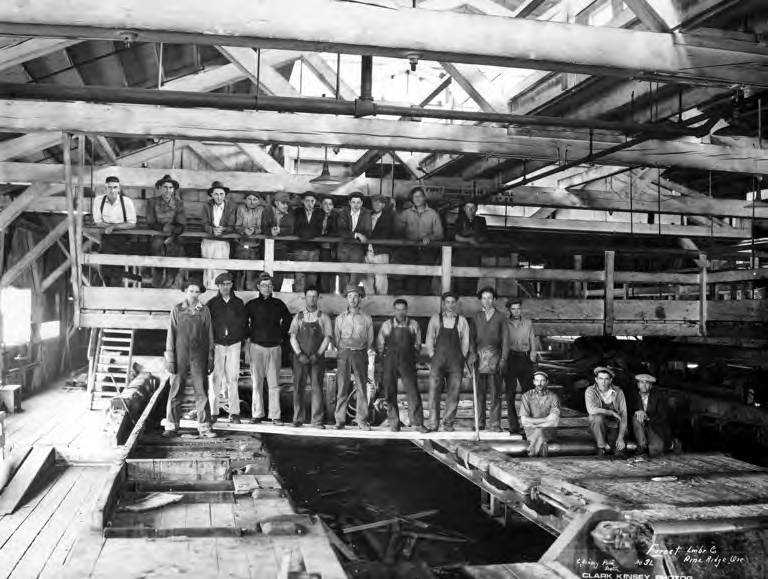
Crew inside mill, ca. 1925

The town included a sawmill, offices, hotel, school, residences, and company store. It was destroyed by the Pine Ridge fire on August 19, 1939, and never rebuilt. The office vault was the only surviving structure, and a house was later built adjacent to it, incorporating it as a room.

- Elevation: 4,186 feet (1,276 meters)
