= Oregon Route 140 =

State highway in southern Oregon, US

Oregon Route 140
- Route 140 highlighted in red

Route information
- Maintained by ODOT
- Length: 237.01 mi (381.43 km)

Major junctions
- West end: I-5 / OR 99 near Central Point
- OR 62 in White City; US 97 / OR 66 in Klamath Falls; OR 39 near Altamont; OR 70 in Dairy; US 395 in Lakeview; US 395 near Lakeview
- East end: SR 140 at the Nevada state line near Adel

Location
- Country: United States
- State: Oregon
- Counties: Harney, Jackson, Klamath, Lake

Highway system
- Oregon Highways; Interstate; US; State; Named; Scenic
← OR 138	→ OR 141

Oregon Route 140 (OR 140) is a state highway in southern Oregon, United States. It is the longest state highway in Oregon, running 237 miles (381 km) from the community of White City, Oregon (just north of Medford), through Klamath Falls and on to Lakeview. It then continues east, eventually descending into the state of Nevada.

== Route description ==
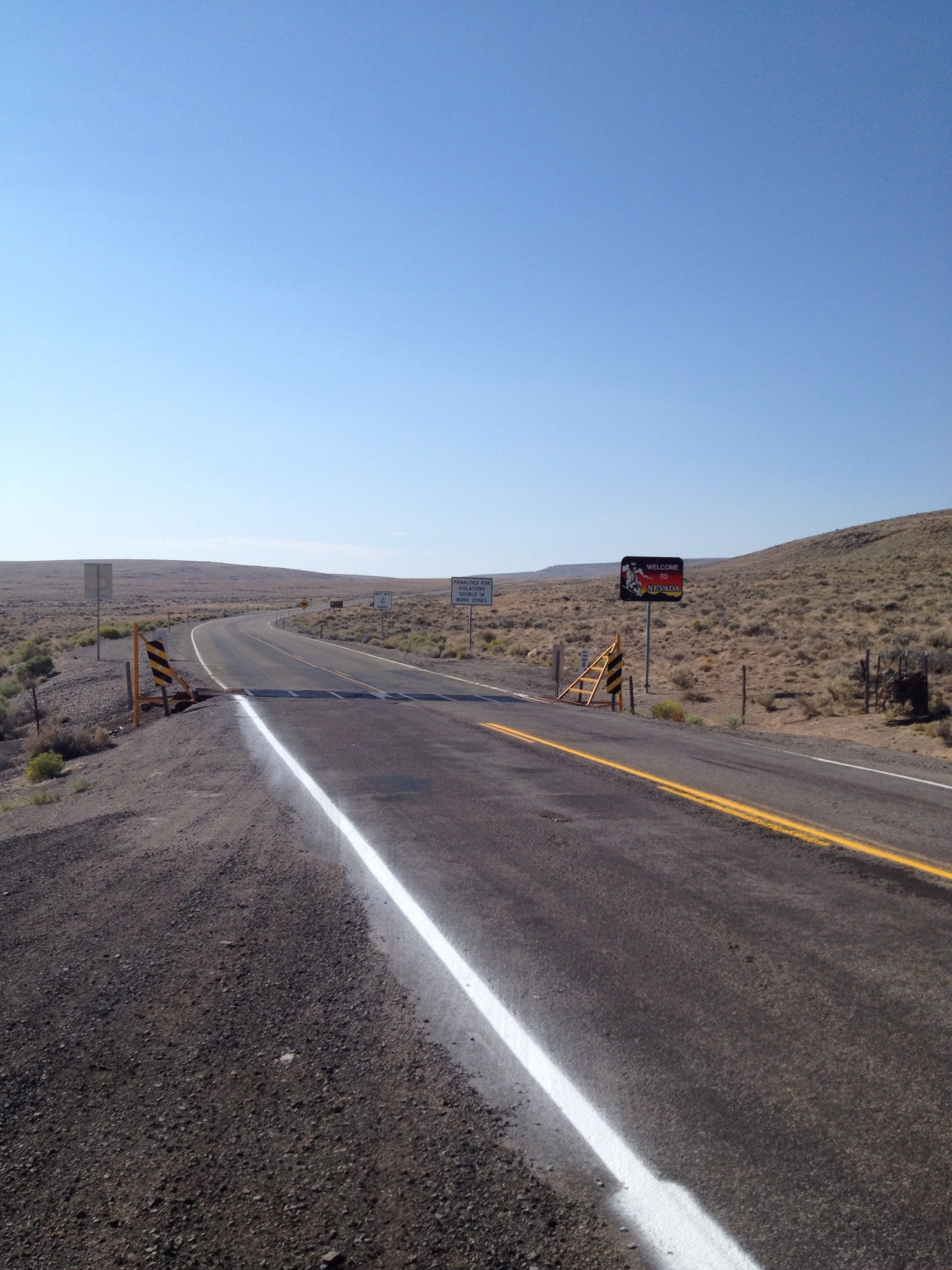
OR 140 meets Nevada State Route 140, April 2013

OR 140 begins at an interchange with Interstate 5 (I-5) and OR 99 near Central Point, northwest of Medford. It travels north and then east along the Rogue River to White City, where the highway uses several city streets. OR 140 then intersects OR 62 (which runs between Medford and Crater Lake National Park) and travels east into the Cascade Mountains. The highway serves as the primary connection between Medford and Klamath Falls and follows the Lake of the Woods Highway No. 270 (see Oregon highways and routes). It passes by its namesake, the scenic Lake of the Woods, and Mount McLoughlin in the Sky Lakes Wilderness. It then runs along the southwestern shore of Upper Klamath Lake, where it is part of the Volcanic Legacy Scenic Byway. Upon entering the Klamath Falls area, it joins together with Oregon Route 66 (which runs between Klamath Falls and Ashland) on the Green Springs Highway No. 21, and the two highways soon intersect with U.S. Route 97 at a freeway interchange.

OR 140 continues east of here, on an alignment known either as the South Klamath Falls Highway No. 424 or the Southside Bypass. Southeast of town, OR 140 intersects with Oregon Route 39, heads north on a shared alignment for about two miles (3 km), on the Klamath Falls-Malin Highway No. 50, and then continues east towards Lakeview on the Klamath Falls-Lakeview Highway No. 20.

In Lakeview, the highway meets U.S. Route 395 on the Fremont Highway No. 19 and runs concurrently with it north for 4.6 miles (7.4 km). Then it heads east as Warner Highway No. 431, skirting the south end of Warner Valley. The road climbs the shear face of the 1,000 feet (300 m) Doherty Slide. The ascent is steep, the road narrow, and there are no shoulders nor guardrails. Heading east it provides a spectacularly exciting view for any front seat passenger as the cliff face is impossible to see giving the impression of being high in the air with no support. At the top of the Doherty Slide the route levels out and is fairly flat over the remaining 10 miles (20 km) to the Nevada state line, where it becomes Nevada State Route 140.

Almost exactly 30 miles (48 km) west of Lakeview, there is a rest stop featuring an informational sign on a "balloon bomb" explosion that took place on May 5, 1945, and resulted in the only civilian casualties of World War II in the continental United States.

== Major intersections ==
County	Location	mi	km	Exit	Destinations	Notes
Jackson		−8.15	−13.12		I-5 / OR 99 – Central Point, Medford, Grants Pass	Interchange
Jackson		0.00	0.00		OR 62 – Eagle Point, Crater Lake, Medford	
Klamath		43.58	70.14		Westside Road – Rocky Point, Fort Klamath, Crater Lake National Park	Former Klamath Lake Highway
Klamath	Klamath Falls	68.76 58.86	110.66 94.73		OR 66 west – Keno, Ashland	Western end of OR 66 overlap
Klamath	Klamath Falls	59.05 0.00	95.03 0.00		US 97 – Klamath Falls, Bend, Weed OR 66 ends	Interchange; eastern end of OR 66 overlap
Klamath		1.57	2.53		Tingley Lane (Midland Highway)	
Klamath	Altamont	2.80	4.51	3	Washburn Way	Interchange
Klamath		5.97 1.78	9.61 2.86		OR 39 south – Merrill, Alturas	Western end of OR 39 overlap
Klamath	Altamont	0.00 5.54	0.00 8.92		OR 39 north – Klamath Falls, Bend	Eastern end of OR 39 overlap
Klamath	Dairy	19.02	30.61		OR 70 east – Bonanza, Lorella	
Lake	Lakeview	96.37 143.03	155.09 230.18		US 395 south – Alturas, Reno	Western end of US 395 overlap
Lake		138.34 0.00	222.64 0.00		US 395 north – Burns, Bend	Eastern end of US 395 overlap
Lake	Adel	28.18	45.35		Plush-Adel Road, Twenty Mile Road – Plush, Hart Mountain Refuge, Fort Bidwell, Coleman Valley	Former Warner Highway (north to Plush)
Harney		65.28	105.06		SR 140	Continuation into Nevada
1.000 mi = 1.609 km; 1.000 km = 0.621 mi: Concurrency terminus

== See also ==
- List of state highways in Oregon
- List of highways numbered 140
