= Klamath County, Oregon =

County in Oregon, United States

- County
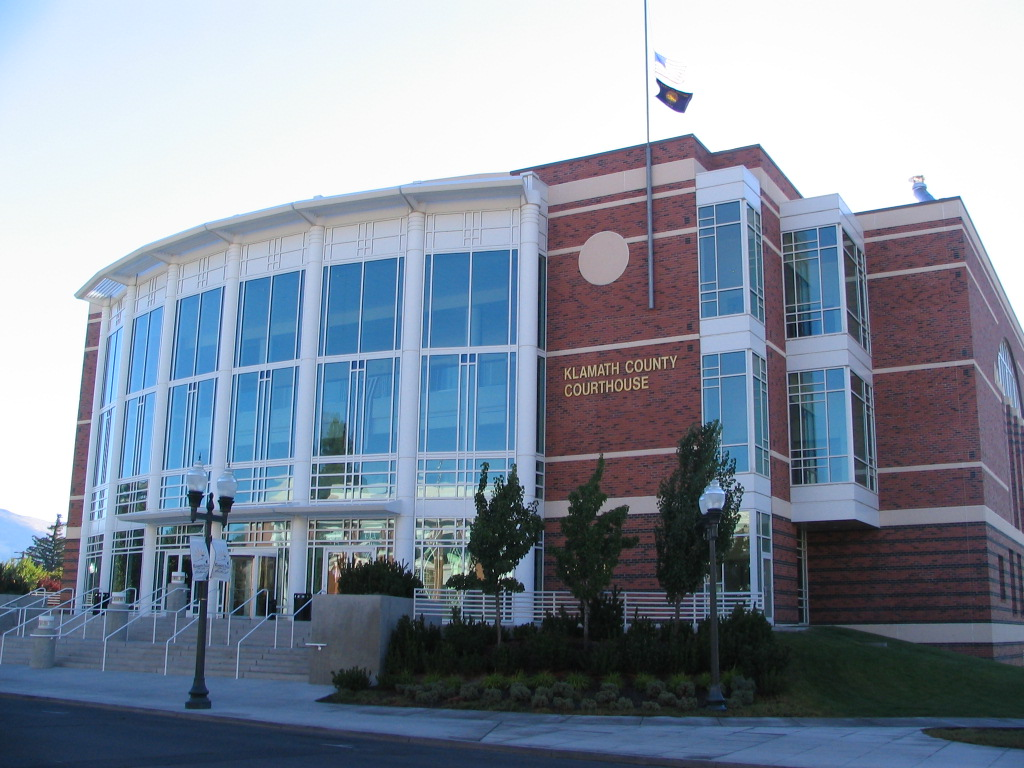
- Klamath County Courthouse in Klamath Falls

- Location within the U.S. state of Oregon
- Coordinates: 42°41′N 121°39′W
- Country: United States
- State: Oregon
- Founded: October 17, 1882
- Named for: Klamath Indians
- Seat: Klamath Falls
- Largest city: Klamath Falls

Area
  - Total: 6,136 sq mi (15,890 km^{2})
  - Land: 5,941 sq mi (15,390 km^{2})
  - Water: 194 sq mi (500 km^{2}) 3.2%

Population (2020)
  - Total: 69,413
  - Estimate (2025): 70,274 ▲
  - Density: 11/sq mi (4.2/km^{2})
- Time zone: UTC−8 (Pacific)
  - Summer (DST): UTC−7 (PDT)
- Congressional district: 2nd
- Website: www.klamathcounty.org

Klamath County (/ˈklæməθ/ KLAM-əth) is one of the 36 counties in the U.S. state of Oregon. As of the 2020 census, the population was 69,413. The county seat is Klamath Falls. The county was named for the Klamath, the tribe of Native Americans living in the area at the time the first European explorers entered the region. Klamath County comprises the Klamath Falls, OR Micropolitan Statistical Area.

== History ==
The Klamath or Clamitte tribe of Indians, for which Klamath County was named, are the descendants of varying cultures of indigenous peoples, who have lived in the area for more than 10,000 years.

When European-Americans began to travel through the area in 1846 along the Applegate Trail, they competed with the Klamath for game and water, which precipitated clashes between the peoples. This was exacerbated by European-American settlers, who cleared the land to farm and encroached on hunting territory. They were successful in demanding the removal of American Indians to reservations.

The Modoc people, having been removed to Oregon to share a reservation with the Klamath, traditional rivals, wanted a reservation created on Lost River, near present-day Merrill, Oregon. Captain Jack led his band back to Lost River, but the US Army, accompanied by militia and citizens of Linkville (present-day Klamath Falls) arrived and convinced Captain Jack to return. An argument broke out, shots were fired, and the Modoc War began as the Modoc fled to Captain Jack's Stronghold in northern California.

A treaty was signed with the Klamath on October 14, 1864, which led to the establishment of the Klamath Reservation. At various times over the next 40 years, different individuals of the Modoc tribe were settled within the reservation.

Because of the extensive tracts of forest, the Klamath were very well-off as a people until the termination of the reservation by the U.S. government in 1954. Termination parceled the communally managed land into individual sections, which tribe members could not manage on their own and were largely forced to sell to speculators.

A few of the Klamath refused to accept the buyout money, most notably Edison Chiloquin (1923–2003). Instead of cash, he insisted on receiving the title to ancestral land along the Sprague River where he lived. On December 5, 1980, the Chiloquin Act was signed into law, giving him title to the properties he wanted.

== Geography ==
Map of Klamath County

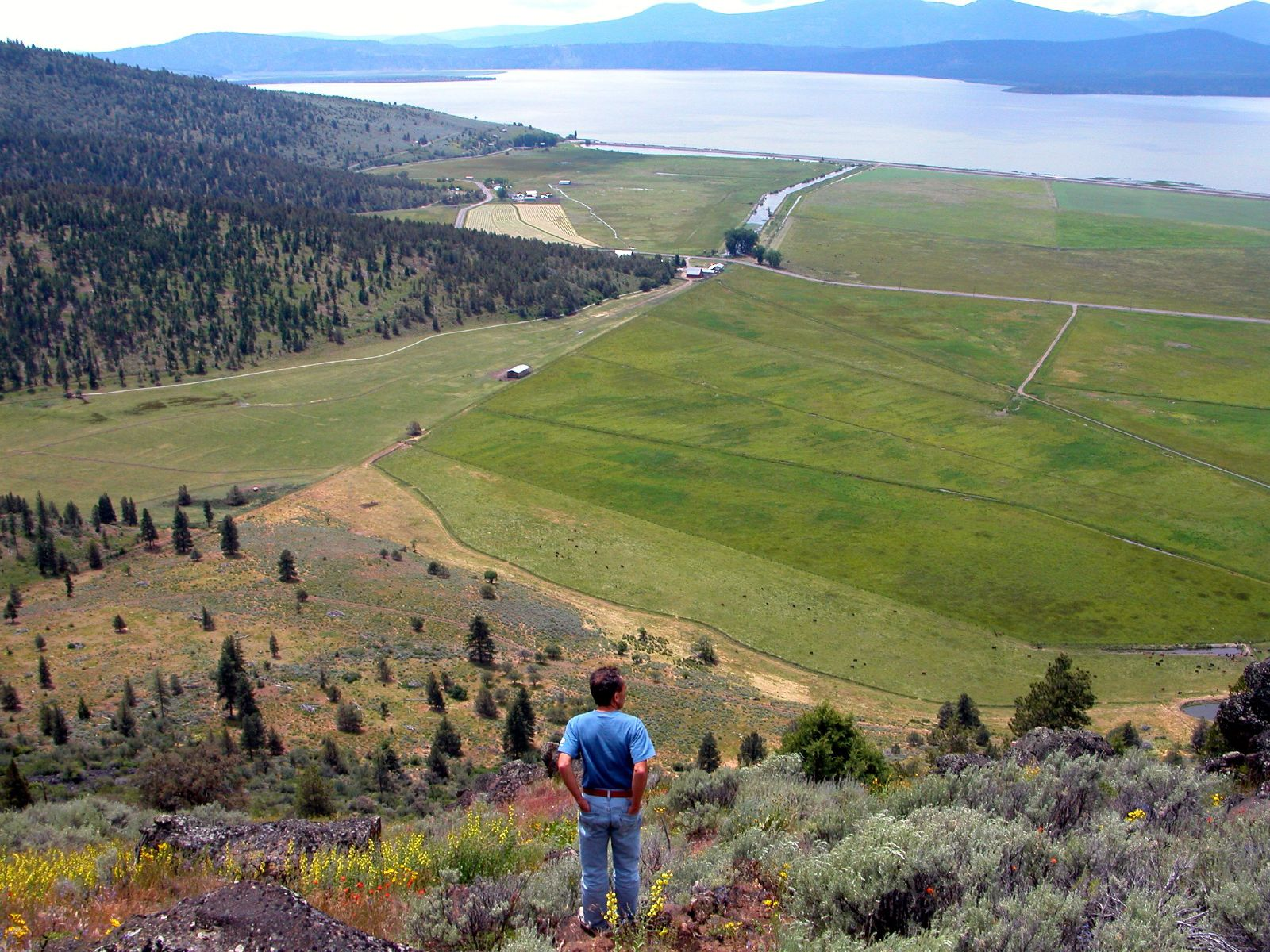
A panoramic view of Klamath County, Oregon, with Klamath Lake in the background

According to the United States Census Bureau, the county has a total area of 6,136 square miles (15,890 km^{2}), of which 5,941 square miles (15,390 km^{2}) is land and 194 square miles (500 km^{2}), or 3.2%, is water. It is the fourth-largest county in Oregon.

=== Adjacent counties ===
- Douglas County (northwest)
- Lane County (northwest)
- Deschutes County (north)
- Lake County (east)
- Siskiyou County, California (south)
- Modoc County, California (south)
- Jackson County (west)

=== National protected areas ===
- Bear Valley National Wildlife Refuge
- Crater Lake National Park (part)
- Deschutes National Forest (part)
- Fremont National Forest (part)
- Klamath Marsh National Wildlife Refuge
- Lower Klamath National Wildlife Refuge (part)
- Rogue River – Siskiyou National Forest (part)
- Upper Klamath National Wildlife Refuge
- Winema National Forest (part)

== Demographics ==
Historical population
Census	Pop.	Note	%±
1890	2,444		—
1900	3,970		62.4%
1910	8,554		115.5%
1920	11,413		33.4%
1930	32,407		183.9%
1940	40,497		25.0%
1950	42,150		4.1%
1960	47,475		12.6%
1970	50,021		5.4%
1980	59,117		18.2%
1990	57,702		−2.4%
2000	63,775		10.5%
2010	66,380		4.1%
2020	69,413		4.6%
2025 (est.)	70,274	▲	1.2%
U.S. Decennial Census; 1790–1960 1900–1990; 1990–2000 2010–2020

=== 2020 census ===
As of the 2020 census, the county had a population of 69,413. Of the residents, 20.9% were under the age of 18 and 22.6% were 65 years of age or older; the median age was 43.0 years. For every 100 females there were 100.1 males, and for every 100 females age 18 and over there were 99.1 males. 62.2% of residents lived in urban areas and 37.8% lived in rural areas.

The racial makeup of the county was 78.5% White, 0.8% Black or African American, 4.3% American Indian and Alaska Native, 1.1% Asian, 0.2% Native Hawaiian and Pacific Islander, 5.1% from some other race, and 10.0% from two or more races. Hispanic or Latino residents of any race comprised 12.6% of the population.

There were 28,634 households in the county, of which 26.4% had children under the age of 18 living with them and 25.3% had a female householder with no spouse or partner present. About 28.9% of all households were made up of individuals and 14.3% had someone living alone who was 65 years of age or older.

There were 32,730 housing units, of which 12.5% were vacant. Among occupied housing units, 66.3% were owner-occupied and 33.7% were renter-occupied. The homeowner vacancy rate was 1.9% and the rental vacancy rate was 7.4%.

Klamath County, Oregon – Racial and ethnic composition Note: the US Census treats Hispanic/Latino as an ethnic category. This table excludes Latinos from the racial categories and assigns them to a separate category. Hispanics/Latinos may be of any race.
Race / Ethnicity (NH = Non-Hispanic)	Pop 1980	Pop 1990	Pop 2000	Pop 2010	Pop 2020	% 1980	% 1990	% 2000	% 2010	% 2020
White alone (NH)	54,689	51,704	53,659	53,822	51,919	92.51%	89.61%	84.14%	81.08%	74.80%
Black or African American alone (NH)	337	352	362	394	497	0.57%	0.61%	0.57%	0.59%	0.72%
Native American or Alaska Native alone (NH)	1,924	2,202	2,443	2,407	2,493	3.25%	3.82%	3.83%	3.63%	3.59%
Asian alone (NH)	371	442	482	615	754	0.63%	0.77%	0.76%	0.93%	1.09%
Native Hawaiian or Pacific Islander alone (NH)	x	x	72	68	104	x	x	0.11%	0.10%	0.15%
Other race alone (NH)	43	18	96	63	396	0.07%	0.03%	0.15%	0.09%	0.57%
Mixed race or Multiracial (NH)	x	x	1,700	2,096	4,478	x	x	2.67%	3.16%	6.45%
Hispanic or Latino (any race)	1,753	2,984	4,961	6,915	8,772	2.97%	5.17%	7.78%	10.42%	12.64%
Total	59,117	57,702	63,775	66,380	69,413	100.00%	100.00%	100.00%	100.00%	100.00%

=== American Community Survey 2025 data ===
The United States Census Bureau estimated that in 2025, Klamath County’s population was 70.158. It was also estimated that the county's population was 75,00% Non-Hispanic White, 12,70% Hispanic or Latino, 1,30% Non-Hispanic Black, 1,40% Asian, 3,60% Native American, 0,80% Pacific Islander, and 5,20% Multiracial.

Total	Population	Percentage
Non-Hispanic White	52.619	75,00%
Hispanic or Latino	8.910	12,70%
Non-Hispanic Black	912	1,30%
Asian	982	1,40%
Native American	2.526	3,60%
Pacific Islander	561	0,80%
Non-Hispanic Multiracial	3.648	5,20%

=== 2010 census ===
As of the 2010 census, there were 66,380 people, 27,280 households, and 17,831 families living in the county. The population density was 11.2 inhabitants per square mile (4.3/km^{2}). There were 32,774 housing units at an average density of 5.5 units per square mile (2.1 units/km^{2}). The racial makeup of the county was 85.9% white, 4.1% American Indian, 0.9% Asian, 0.7% black or African American, 0.1% Pacific islander, 4.1% from other races, and 4.1% from two or more races. Those of Hispanic or Latino origin made up 10.4% of the population. In terms of ancestry, 20.0% were German, 14.7% were Irish, 11.9% were English, and 5.5% were American.

Of the 27,280 households, 28.4% had children under the age of 18 living with them, 49.7% were married couples living together, 10.7% had a female householder with no husband present, 34.6% were non-families, and 27.3% of all households were made up of individuals. The average household size was 2.40 and the average family size was 2.88. The median age was 41.7 years.

The median income for a household in the county was $41,818 and the median income for a family was $51,596. Males had a median income of $42,215 versus $30,413 for females. The per capita income for the county was $22,081. About 12.7% of families and 16.6% of the population were below the poverty line, including 21.8% of those under age 18 and 9.1% of those age 65 or over.

=== 2000 census ===
As of the 2000 census, there were 63,775 people, 25,205 households, and 17,290 families living in the county. The population density was 11 people per square mile (4.2 people/km^{2}). There were 28,883 housing units at an average density of 5 units per square mile (1.9/km^{2}). The racial makeup of the county was 87.33% White, 0.63% Black or African American, 4.19% Native American, 0.80% Asian, 0.12% Pacific Islander, 3.45% from other races, and 3.47% from two or more races. 7.78% of the population were Hispanic or Latino of any race. 16.7% were of German, 10.8% Irish, 10.7% English and 9.8% United States or American ancestry. 92.6% spoke English and 6.1% Spanish as their first language.

There were 25,205 households, out of which 30.30% had children under the age of 18 living with them, 54.20% were married couples living together, 10.00% had a female householder with no husband present, and 31.40% were non-families. 25.30% of all households were made up of individuals, and 10.40% had someone living alone who was 65 years of age or older. The average household size was 2.49 and the average family size was 2.95.

In the county, the population was spread out, with 25.80% under the age of 18, 8.60% from 18 to 24, 25.50% from 25 to 44, 25.20% from 45 to 64, and 14.90% who were 65 years of age or older. The median age was 38 years. For every 100 females there were 100.10 males. For every 100 females age 18 and over, there were 97.30 males.

The median income for a household in the county was $31,537, and the median income for a family was $38,171. Males had a median income of $32,052 versus $22,382 for females. The per capita income for the county was $16,719. About 12.00% of families and 16.80% of the population were below the poverty line, including 22.40% of those under age 18 and 7.70% of those age 65 or over.

== Communities ==
=== Cities ===
- Bonanza
- Chiloquin
- Klamath Falls (county seat)
- Malin
- Merrill

=== Census-designated places ===
- Altamont
- Beatty
- Beaver Marsh
- Bly
- Chemult
- Crescent
- Crescent Lake
- Falcon Heights
- Fort Klamath
- Gilchrist
- Keno
- Oregon Shores
- Rocky Point
- Running Y Ranch
- Sprague River

=== Other unincorporated communities ===
- Ady
- Algoma
- Cascade Summit
- Dairy
- Fairhaven
- Hager
- Hatfield (part)
- Haynesville
- Henley
- Hildebrand
- Hot Springs
- Kirk
- Klamath Agency
- Lake of the Woods
- Langell Valley
- Lenz
- Lorella
- Malone
- Midland
- Modoc Point
- Odell Lake
- Odessa
- Olene
- Pelican City
- Pine Grove
- Pine Ridge
- Shevlin
- Worden
- Yonna

== Government ==
United States presidential election results for Klamath County, Oregon
Year	Republican		Democratic		Third party(ies)	
Year	No.	%	No.	%	No.	%
1904	552	68.74%	208	25.90%	43	5.35%
1908	634	54.61%	427	36.78%	100	8.61%
1912	433	22.29%	815	41.95%	695	35.77%
1916	1,631	44.37%	1,853	50.41%	192	5.22%
1920	2,742	70.18%	901	23.06%	264	6.76%
1924	2,775	53.48%	680	13.10%	1,734	33.42%
1928	4,453	61.28%	2,721	37.44%	93	1.28%
1932	3,483	32.38%	6,772	62.97%	500	4.65%
1936	3,225	26.39%	8,562	70.05%	435	3.56%
1940	6,169	39.52%	9,345	59.87%	96	0.61%
1944	5,969	46.94%	6,656	52.34%	92	0.72%
1948	7,072	47.47%	7,520	50.48%	306	2.05%
1952	11,517	64.02%	6,407	35.62%	65	0.36%
1956	9,740	53.59%	8,434	46.41%	0	0.00%
1960	9,095	50.46%	8,928	49.54%	0	0.00%
1964	8,530	48.47%	9,066	51.51%	3	0.02%
1968	9,604	56.44%	5,629	33.08%	1,784	10.48%
1972	11,169	58.93%	5,719	30.17%	2,066	10.90%
1976	11,649	52.50%	9,659	43.53%	879	3.96%
1980	16,060	62.75%	7,371	28.80%	2,161	8.44%
1984	17,686	69.81%	7,575	29.90%	74	0.29%
1988	13,484	60.01%	8,429	37.51%	557	2.48%
1992	11,864	44.61%	7,918	29.77%	6,811	25.61%
1996	12,116	54.19%	7,207	32.23%	3,037	13.58%
2000	18,855	67.72%	7,541	27.08%	1,448	5.20%
2004	22,733	72.13%	8,264	26.22%	518	1.64%
2008	19,113	65.01%	9,370	31.87%	916	3.12%
2012	18,898	67.13%	8,302	29.49%	952	3.38%
2016	20,435	66.98%	7,210	23.63%	2,862	9.38%
2020	25,308	68.91%	10,388	28.29%	1,030	2.80%
2024	24,675	69.48%	9,856	27.75%	984	2.77%

Like most of southwestern Oregon, Klamath County is a Republican stronghold. The county has reliably given a majority of its votes to Republican politicians for years; the last time a Democratic candidate for US president carried Klamath County was in 1964, when Lyndon Johnson won by a landslide nationwide against Barry Goldwater — but only by three percentage points in Klamath County.

Klamath County is represented in the Oregon House of Representatives by two Republicans, E. Werner Reschke and Emily McIntire, and in the Oregon State Senate by Republican Diane Linthicum. Federally, Cliff Bentz, a Republican, is Klamath County's representative in the United States House from the 2nd district.

== Economy ==
Historically, Klamath County's economy was based on timber and agriculture, and although these natural resource industries now contribute only a small fraction to the region's current economic activity and employment, their legacy lives on in local politics, community identity, and landscape. Euro-American settlement in the area was spurred in the early 20th century with the coming of the railroad. In addition, the government-subsidized federal reclamation project, the Klamath Irrigation Project, dammed upper tributaries and drained much of the 128 square miles (331.5 km^{2}) Lower Klamath and Tule lakes to convert 188,000 acres (760 km^{2}) of former lakebed and wetlands into farmland, to be supported by irrigation.

Today the Sky Lakes Medical Center is the largest employer in the area, followed by Klamath County School District and Jeld-Wen, a manufacturer of doors and windows. The area is currently experiencing a boom in housing construction, as its proximity to California brings waves of retirees from population centers to the south. Outdoor recreation, such as hiking, hunting, and world-class trout fishing, as well as Oregon's only National Park at Crater Lake, contribute to the economy of the area. A complex of six National Wildlife Refuges—Klamath Basin National Wildlife Refuges Complex—seasonally draw some of the largest concentrations of waterfowl in North America. The area is world-renowned as a birdwatcher's paradise. Natural geothermal hot wells provide heat for many homes, businesses, and the Oregon Institute of Technology campus. The full potential of this energy resource continues to be studied.

== Education ==
Colleges and universities

- Klamath Community College
- Oregon Institute of Technology

Most of Klamath County is in the district for Klamath Community College. Northern parts of the county are instead in the district of Central Oregon Community College.

There are two school districts: Klamath County School District and Klamath Falls City Schools.

== See also ==
- National Register of Historic Places listings in Klamath County, Oregon
- List of parks in Klamath Falls, Oregon
