= Gerber Reservoir =

Reservoir in Oregon, USA

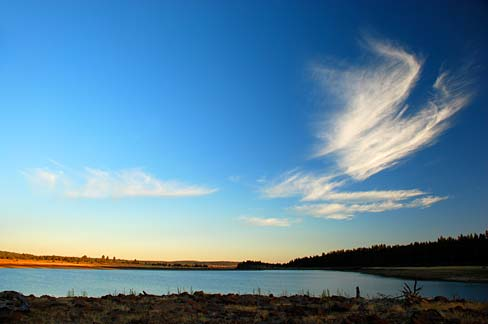
- Gerber Reservoir at sunset

- Location within Oregon Location within the United States
- Location: Klamath County, Oregon
- Coordinates: 42.1990448°N 121.1020378°W
- Type: Reservoir
- Primary inflows: Miller Creek and its tributaries
- Primary outflows: Miller Creek
- Catchment area: 234 square miles (610 km^{2})
- First flooded: June 1925
- Max. length: 5 mi (8.0 km)
- Max. width: 2.3 mi (3.7 km)
- Surface area: 3,815 acres (1,544 ha)
- Average depth: 27 ft (8.2 m)
- Max. depth: 65 ft (20 m)
- Shore length^{1}: 28.9 mi (46.5 km)
- Surface elevation: 4,835 ft (1,474 m)
- ^{1} Shore length is not a well-defined measure.

Gerber Reservoir is an irrigation impoundment created by Gerber Dam. It is located in southern Klamath County, Oregon, United States. The reservoir covers 3,815 acres (1,544 ha). The dam and reservoir are named in honor of Louis C. Gerber, an early pioneer who owned much of the land flooded by the reservoir. Today, the reservoir and surrounding property is owned by the United States Government. It is administered by the Bureau of Reclamation and the Bureau of Land Management. Gerber Reservoir is a popular outdoor recreation site with two campgrounds along its west shore.

== History ==
Native Americans occupied sites around what is now Gerber Reservoir for perhaps 6,400 years before the first European settlers arrived in the area. Ancient campsites have been found in the area of Gerber Reservoir. Family bands of Klamath and Modoc peoples used these sites from early spring through fall for hunting, fishing, and plant gathering activities.

Louis C. Gerber (1854–1930) and his family were among the first whites to settle in the area. In the mid-1880s, Gerber used the Swamp Act to acquire 840 acres (340 ha) along Miller Creek on the high plateau northeast of the Langell Valley. In 1895, he filed a homestead claim on an adjacent 168-acre (68 ha) parcel. By 1915, Gerber had also purchased 20 abandoned homesteads in the same area. He consolidated all these properties into the Gerber Ranch. In 1923, Gerber sold 1,008 acres (408 ha) to the United States Government. This area was flooded when the Bureau of Reclamation completed the Miller Creek impoundment dam in June 1925. Both the dam and the reservoir it created were named in his honor.

During World War II, the island in the middle of Gerber Reservoir was used as a United States military bombing range. Today, ospreys and pelicans nest on the island.

== Watershed ==
Gerber Reservoir is located on the east side of the Cascade Range in southern Oregon. The reservoir's water comes from Miller Creek and its tributaries. In addition to Miller Creek, Barnes Creek, Barnes Valley Creek, and Ben Hall Creek are year-around tributaries of the reservoir. There are also a number of ephemeral tributaries that dry up in summer. The reservoir's outlet is Miller Creek, as it flows over Gerber Dam. From there, the water flows southwest through Miller Creek Canyon to the Langell Valley, where it runs into the Lost River.

The watershed that drains into Gerber Reservoir covers 234 square miles (610 km^{2}). There are three primary vegetation zones that make up the watershed: coniferous forest, juniper woodlands, and shrub-steppe. There are also some meadow lands within the pine forest zone and in riparian areas along drainages that empty into the reservoir from the north and south. The watershed to the north, south, and west of the reservoir are pine forest. The area east of the reservoir is mostly juniper woodlands. The areas immediately surrounding the reservoir are shrub-steppe.

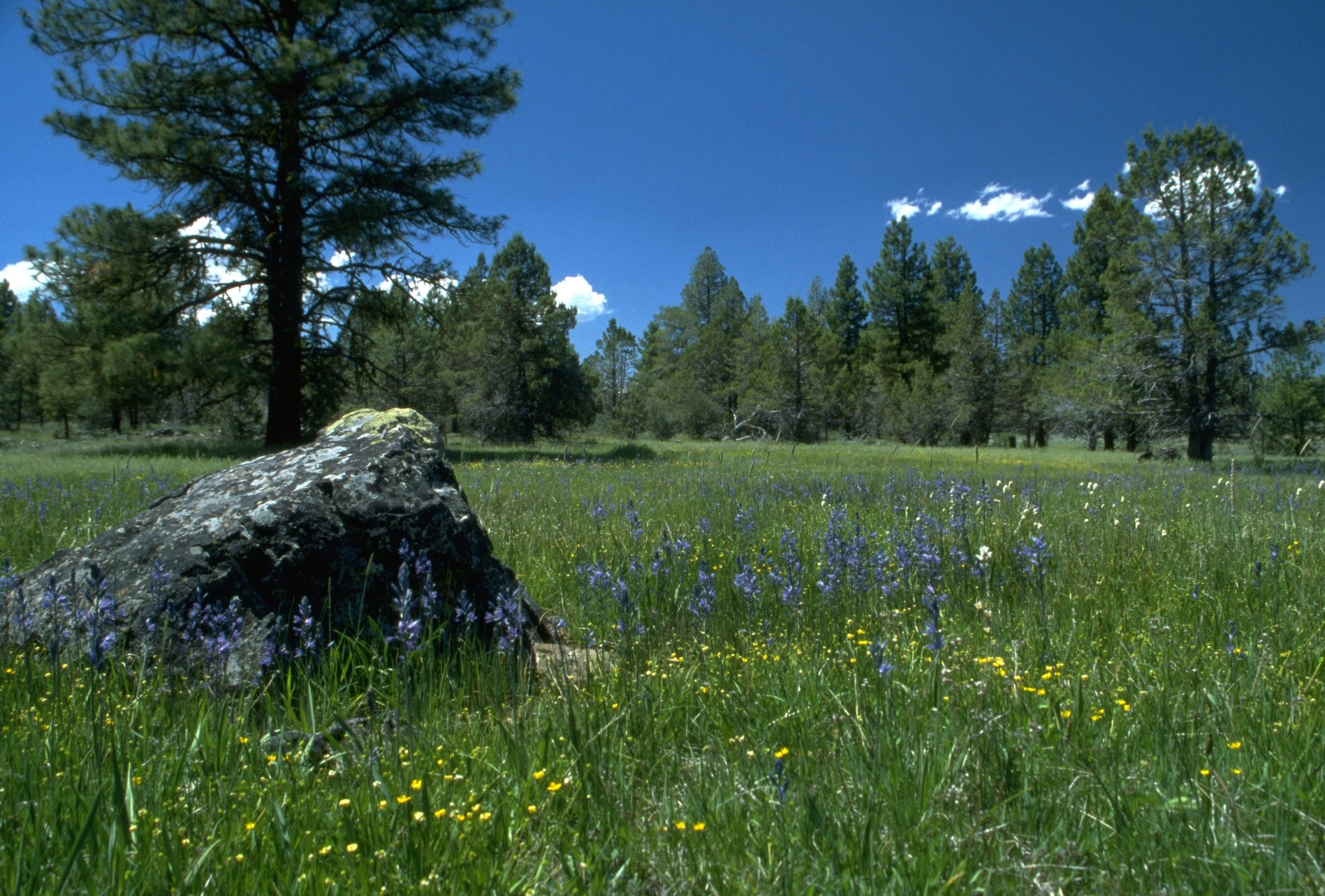
Forest and meadow near Gerber Reservoir

The vegetation in the coniferous forest is dominated by ponderosa pine. Other tree species found in the watershed are lodgepole pine, sugar pine, white fir, and incense cedar. The forest understory include mountain mahogany, big sagebrush, low sagebrush, rabbitbrush, bitterbrush, and manzanita. Other common forest plants include ceanothus, huckleberry, snowberry, blue elderberry, chokecherry, twinberry, and serviceberry. Flowering plants include lupine, vetch, asters, biscuitroot, balsamroot, wild strawberry, yarrow, and dandelion. Grasses found in the forested areas include Idaho fescue, intermediate wheatgrass, bluebunch wheatgrass, bottlebrush squirreltail, and Thurber needlegrass. Invasive species include Kentucky bluegrass and cheatgrass brome. There are also quaking aspen in the upland meadows areas dispersed within the pine forest portion of the watershed.

Juniper woodlands are drier forest areas with shallow, sandy soil. Western juniper is the dominant species. The understory is similar to the pine forest with big sagebrush and bitterbrush widely distributed. Mountain mahogany, low sagebrush, rabbitbrush, and gray horsebrush are common in some areas. Grasses include Idaho fescue, bluebunch wheatgrass, bottlebrush squirreltail, granite prickly-phlox, western needlegrass, and Sandberg bluegrass.

The shrub-steppe areas around Gerber Reservoir are generally dominated by big sagebrush with low sagebrush common in rocky areas. Other vegetation includes rabbitbrush, spiny hopsage, wax currant, balsamroot, desert parsley, willow dock, blazing star, sunflower, plains mustard, tarweed, manna grass, buckwheat, and ryegrass.

== Environment ==
Gerber Reservoir is an irrigation impoundment created by Gerber Dam. The reservoir covers 3,815 acres (1,544 ha). It is approximately 5 miles (8.0 km) long and 2.3 miles (3.7 km) wide. The reservoir has a branching shape with shallow arms that follow various watershed drainages. There is one permanent island in the middle of the reservoir. The reservoir has an average depth of 27 feet (8.2 m) with a maximum depth of 65 feet (20 m). Its elevation is 4,835 feet (1,474 m) above sea level.

While very few aquatic plants live in the shallow branches, the reservoir is still very productive. Its trophic state is classified as eutrophic. A combination of suspended inorganic matter and phytoplankton growth limit the water's transparency. In the main part of the reservoir, the water is deep enough for thermal stratification. In the deeper thermal layers, there is less oxygen than is found near the surface.

The reservoir is in the rain shadow of the Cascade Range. As a result, the weather in the Gerber area is typical of high plateaus in the northern Basin and Range Province. It is characterized by ample sunshine, low precipitation, and wide temperature ranges. Low humidity causes rapid evaporation. As a rule, winters in the Gerber area are long and summers mild.

Climate data for Gerber Dam, Oregon
Month	Jan	Feb	Mar	Apr	May	Jun	Jul	Aug	Sep	Oct	Nov	Dec	Year
Mean daily maximum °F (°C)	42.4 (5.8)	45.3 (7.4)	50.6 (10.3)	55.1 (12.8)	65.0 (18.3)	73.6 (23.1)	84.9 (29.4)	84.2 (29.0)	76.4 (24.7)	63.4 (17.4)	48.1 (8.9)	40.4 (4.7)	60.8 (16.0)
Daily mean °F (°C)	31.3 (−0.4)	33.8 (1.0)	38.7 (3.7)	42.9 (6.1)	51.1 (10.6)	57.4 (14.1)	66.8 (19.3)	65.8 (18.8)	57.3 (14.1)	47.1 (8.4)	36.7 (2.6)	30.4 (−0.9)	46.6 (8.1)
Mean daily minimum °F (°C)	20.1 (−6.6)	22.2 (−5.4)	26.7 (−2.9)	30.7 (−0.7)	37.2 (2.9)	41.1 (5.1)	48.7 (9.3)	47.3 (8.5)	38.2 (3.4)	30.8 (−0.7)	25.3 (−3.7)	20.3 (−6.5)	32.4 (0.2)
Source: National Oceanic and Atmospheric Administration, National Climatic Data Center normals data, 1981–2010

The annual average high temperature at Gerber Reservoir is 46.6 °F (8 °C). The warmest month is normally July, which has an average high of 84.9 °F (29 °C). The annual average low temperature is 32.4 °F (0 °C). January is normally the coldest month, with an average low of 20.1 °F (−7 °C). Gerber gets an average of 14 inches (360 mm) of precipitation per year, much of it coming as snow. Precipitation occurs mainly in the winter with smaller amounts in the fall and spring. Summers are generally dry except during localized thunderstorms. The prevailing winds are from the west and south.

== Ecology ==
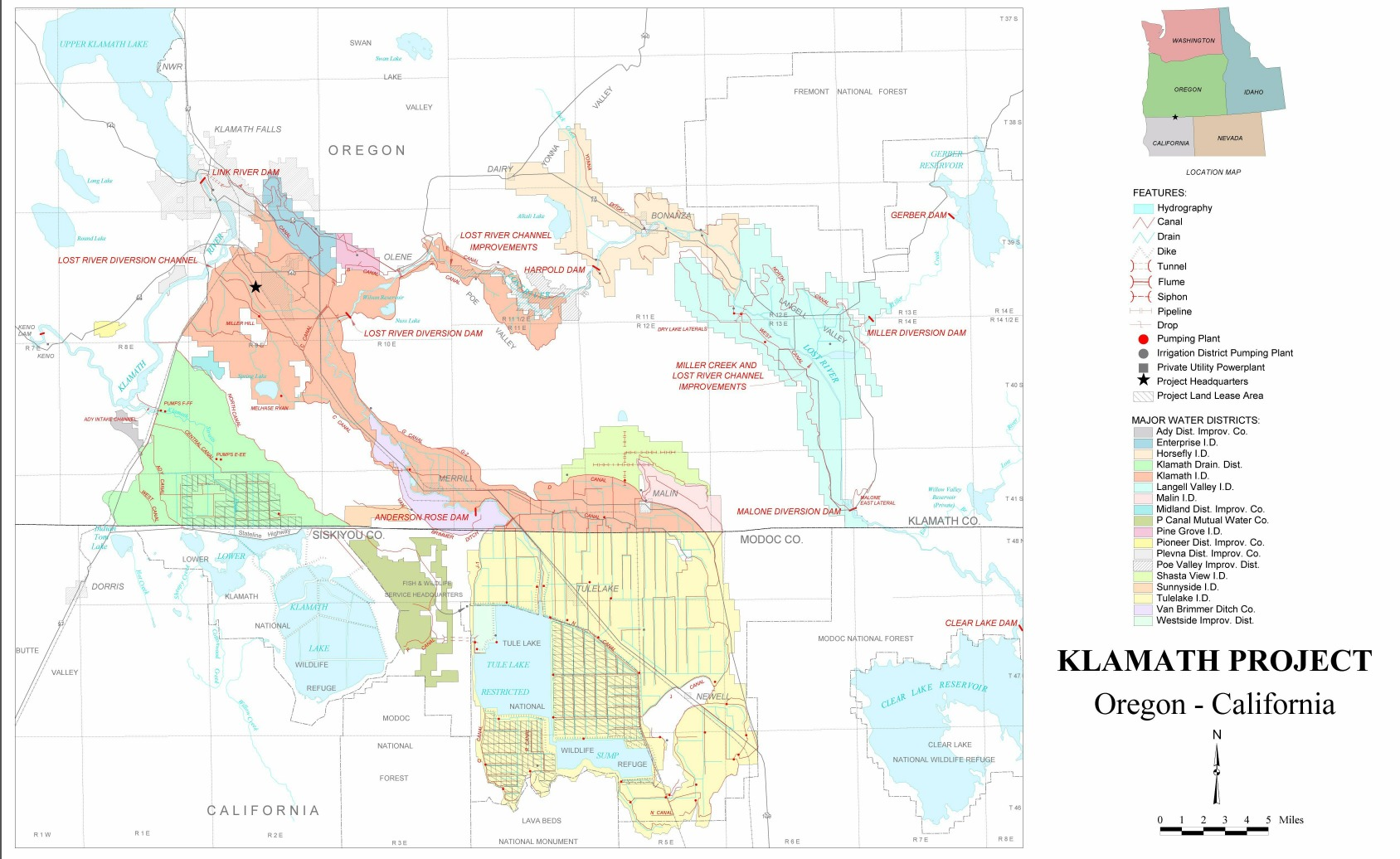
Gerber Reservoir, part of the Klamath Project.

The meadows near the reservoir have camas and tufted hairgrass. Wetlands along the reservoir shoreline have sedge, cattails, bulrushes, arumleaf arrowroot, pond lily, sago pondweed, widgeon grass, sego lily, burr weed, and tule. There are also willows in riparian areas along drainages that empty into the reservoir.

The reservoir's game fish includes white crappie, yellow perch, bluegill, brown bullhead, largemouth bass, rainbow trout, brown trout, and brook trout. The crappie and perch are particularly sought after by anglers. Crappies over 12 inches (30 cm) long are common. The largest crappie ever caught at the reservoir weighed well over 4 pounds (1.8 kg), an Oregon state record. Perch up to 14 inches (36 cm) long are also common at Gerber. Other fish found in the reservoir include tui chub, blue chub, speckled dace, and shortnose sucker.

In addition to fish, the reservoir provide habitat for a wide variety of bird species. Birdwatchers can see waterfowl, songbirds, and birds of prey in the Gerber area. Common waterfowl include western grebe, red-necked grebe, common loon, hooded merganser, common merganser, trumpeter swan, Canada goose, snow goose, black tern, American coot, and a number of duck species. Other water-dependent birds found at the reservoir include sandhill crane, great blue heron, black-crowned night heron, American bittern, snowy egret, American white pelican, American avocet, long-billed curlew, willet, Virginia rail, spotted sandpiper, and common snipe.

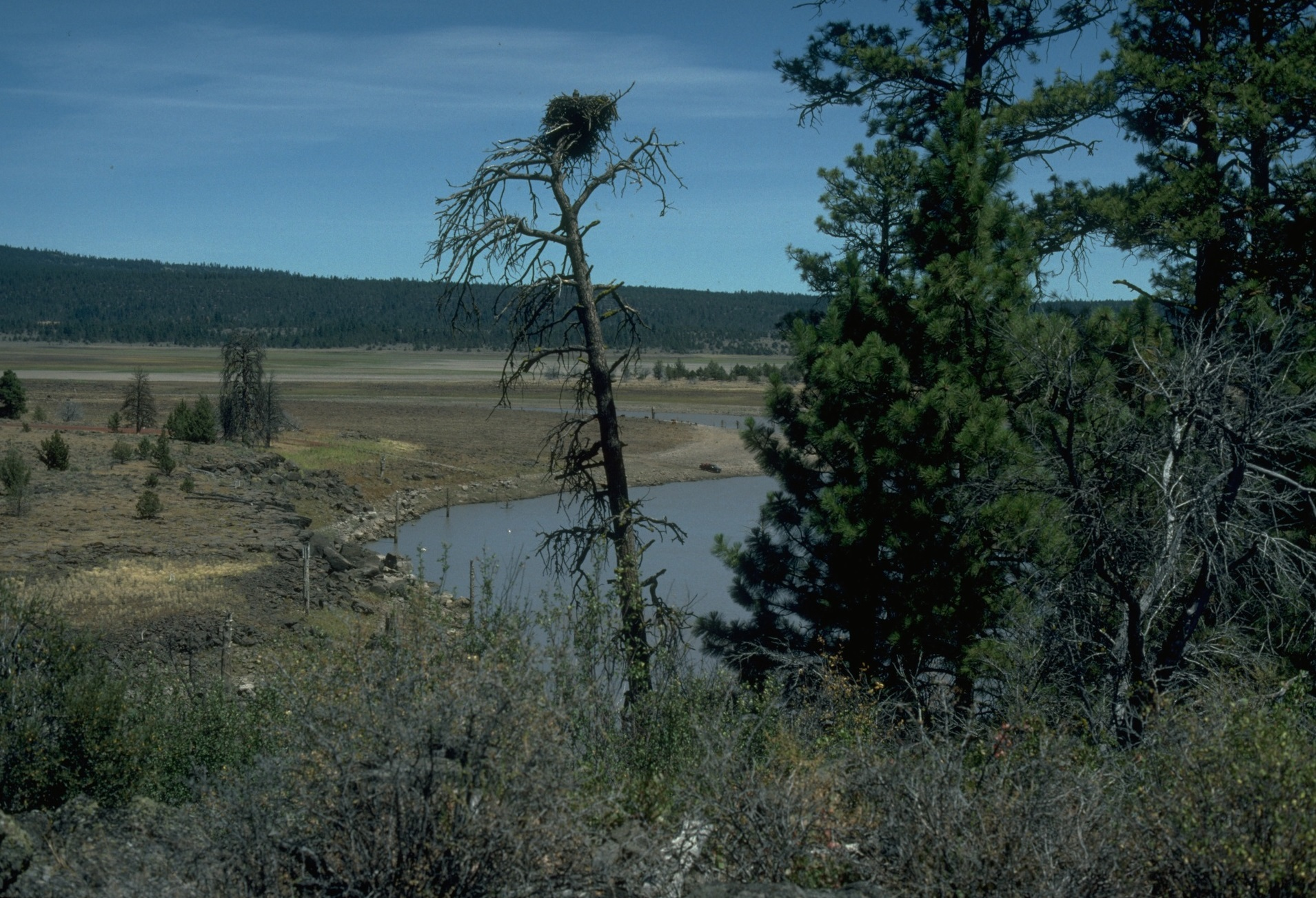
Osprey nest overlooking Gerber Reservoir

In the forest around the reservoir, there are black-billed magpies, common ravens, Brewer's blackbirds, northern flickers, rock doves, and mourning doves as well as downy woodpecker. Several owl species are found near the reservoir. These include the great horned owl, great grey owl, barn owl, and screech owl. Other bird species common to the area are Steller's jay, pinyon jay, scrub jay, American robin, hermit thrush, western bluebird, mountain bluebird, western meadowlark, horned lark, Cassin's finch, sagebrush sparrow, lark sparrows cedar waxwing, brown creeper, mountain chickadee, dark-eyed junco, red-breasted nuthatch, yellow-rumped warblers, red crossbill, northern oriole, green-tailed towhee, Lazuli bunting, plain titmouse, purple martin, cliff swallow, rock wren, Hammond's flycatcher, American dusky flycatcher, western kingbird, brown-headed cowbird, pine siskin, sage thrasher, and two hummingbird species. The reservoir also attracts birds of prey including prairie falcon, northern goshawk, Cooper's hawk, red-tailed hawk, turkey vulture, osprey, golden eagle, and bald eagles.

The mixed conifer forest, juniper woodlands, and shrub-steppe zones around the reservoir are home to numerous mammals, both large and small. It is estimated that approximately 4,900 mule deer winter in the Gerber Reservoir area. In addition to mule deer, the larger mammals include pronghorn, Roosevelt elk, coyote, American black bear, bobcat, and cougar. Some of the small mammals found in the Gerber area are badger, raccoon, porcupine, striped skunk, western spotted skunk, marten, mink, long-tailed weasel, black-tailed jackrabbit, mountain cottontail, and pika. Rodents common to the area include western gray squirrel, golden-mantled ground squirrel, least chipmunk, western harvest mouse, Great Basin pocket mouse, and northern grasshopper mouse. There are also five bat species found in the Gerber area.

Reptiles found in the Gerber area include both snakes and lizards. The snakes species are common garter snake, western terrestrial garter snake, striped whipsnake, gopher snake, rubber boa, and western rattlesnake. Lizards include western fence lizard, sagebrush lizard, short-horned lizard, and western skink. There are four amphibians that live in or around Gerber Reservoir: the Pacific tree frog, Oregon spotted frog, western toad, and the long-toed salamander.

== Recreation ==
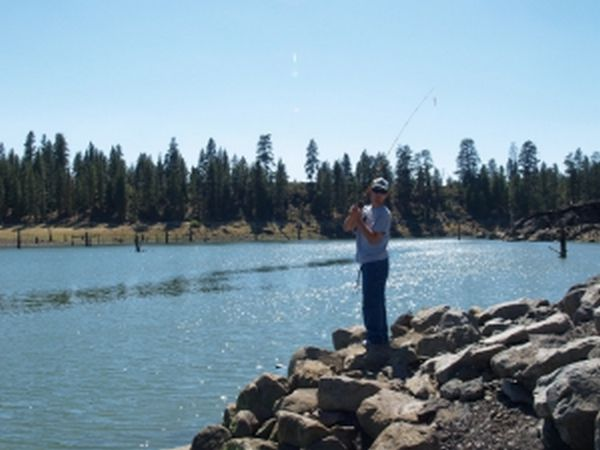
Fishing along the shore of Gerber Reservoir

The Bureau of Land Management actively manages the area around Gerber Reservoir. Over the years, two campgrounds have been developed at the reservoir. Together, they provide a wide range of facilities including potable water, restrooms, campsites, picnic tables, cooking grills, boat ramps, floating docks, and fish cleaning stations. Garbage collection and a recreational vehicle dump station are also provided. Fees are charged for camping and day use at both campgrounds. There are also some primitive campsites near the reservoir. There is no fee for using the undeveloped camp sites.

There are two campgrounds at Gerber Reservoir with a total of 50 developed campsites. Both of the campgrounds are located along the west shore of the reservoir. They are open year around. However, the campground facilities are only maintained during the summer, from mid-May to mid-September. Gerber North campground has 25 campsites, as does Gerber South campground. During the summer, the reservoir is a popular place for fishing, boating, canoeing, and kayaking. There are also trails near the lake for hiking and mountain biking. The Gerber Watchable Wildlife Tour has nine wildlife viewing stations near the reservoir. In addition, Gerber Reservoir is a stop on the Klamath Basin Birding Trail.

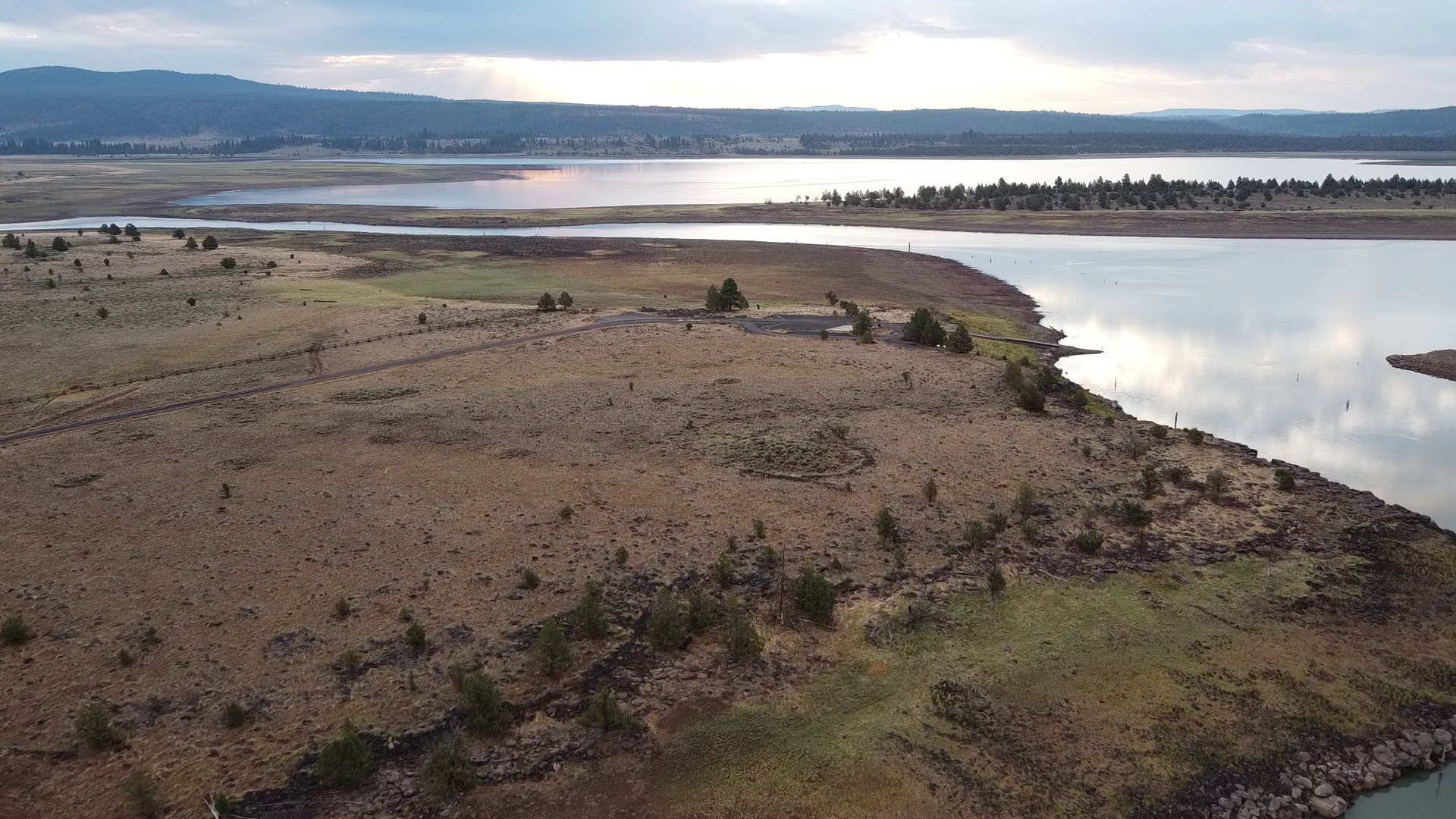
Aerial view of Gerber Reservoir boat ramp

There are a number of archeological sites near the reservoir. It is against Federal law to disturb or remove artifacts from these sites. Visitors who happen upon an archeological sites are asked to contact the Bureau of Land Management office in Klamath Falls.

== Location ==
Gerber Reservoir is located in Klamath County, Oregon. It is 42 miles (68 km) east of Klamath Falls and 93 miles (150 km) west of Lakeview, Oregon, off of Oregon Route 140. To get to the Gerber Reservoir campgrounds from Klamath Falls, take Route 140 east to Dairy, Oregon. At Dairy, turn south onto Oregon Route 70 and travel 5 miles (8.0 km) to Bonanza, Oregon. From there, continue on East Langell Valley Road for 11 miles (18 km); then turn left onto Gerber Road. Follow Gerber Road for 8.5 miles (13.7 km) to the Gerber recreation area.

== See also ==
- List of lakes in Oregon
