= Nuss Lake =

Lake in Oregon, United States

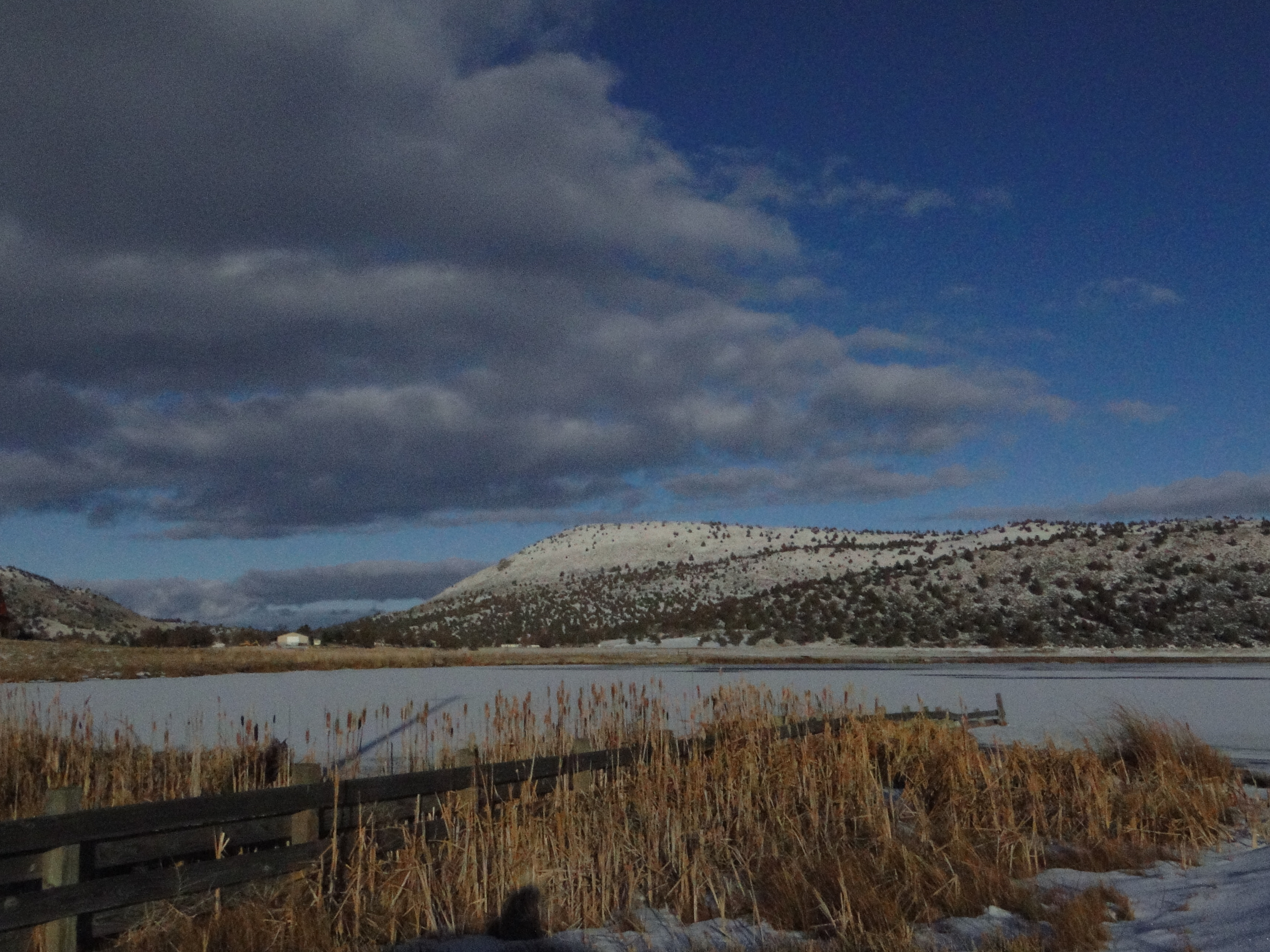
- Nuss Lake, East ridge of Stukel Mountain in the background

- Location within Oregon Location within the United States
- Location: Klamath Falls, Oregon, United States
- Coordinates: 42.14778°N 121.63472°W
- Primary inflows: Lost River diversions
- Basin countries: United States
- Surface area: 0.55 km^{2} (0.21 sq mi)
- Surface elevation: 1,249 m (4,098 ft)

Nuss Lake is a small private lake in Klamath Falls, Oregon, United States. It is 0.2 mi^{2} (0.52 km^{2}) in size, located approximately 6.6 miles (10.6 kilometers) from Altamont. The lake sits between the south skirt of Stukel Mountain and Olene Gap to the north.

== Hydrology ==
The Klamath area has a peculiar natural draining system. The larger portion of this area, including Poe, Langell and Yonna valleys, is drained by the Lost River and its tributaries, which flow into several small lakes before emptying into Tule Lake. Even though there are not many springs in Klamath County, some of the identifiable perennial springs that appear at land surface issue from the bottom of Nuss Lake. Hydraulic heads in wells are above surface at several places in the area, indicating that the aquifer is confined at these places, extending around Nuss Lake and the valley south and west of Stukel Mountain along Lost River. Many of these wells, including some north of Stukel Mountain have large flows. Two springs at Olene Gap are actually warm artesian springs whose waters are partly derived from the geothermal reservoir.

=== Irrigation ===
The Olene flume supplies second unit lands in the South Poe Valley and Nuss Lake districts, the total irrigable area being about 4,200 acres (1,700 hectares), of which approximately 60% is in cultivation.

== Fishing ==
The most common type of fish in the lake are largemouth bass, rainbow trout and bluegill.

== Geography ==
Approximately 66,500 people live in Klamath County, mainly in the Klamath Falls metropolitan area. Many small towns in South and Eastern Klamath Falls are centered on a rural agricultural base that takes advantage of the peculiar irrigation systems offered by the Upper Klamath Lake and Lost River. These communities are established upon seasonal industry, which feature large swings in labor force size, and in many cases, precipitate mass migrations of workers.

Within 5 miles (8.0 kilometres) of the shores of Nuss Lake, the locally called Poe Valley, are the cities of Bonanza, Merrill, Malin, Dorris and Tulelake, as well as the unincorporated communities of Altamont, Olene and Langell Valley.

== See also ==
- Lake Ewauna
- List of lakes in Oregon
