= Lake Modoc =

Former lake in California and Oregon

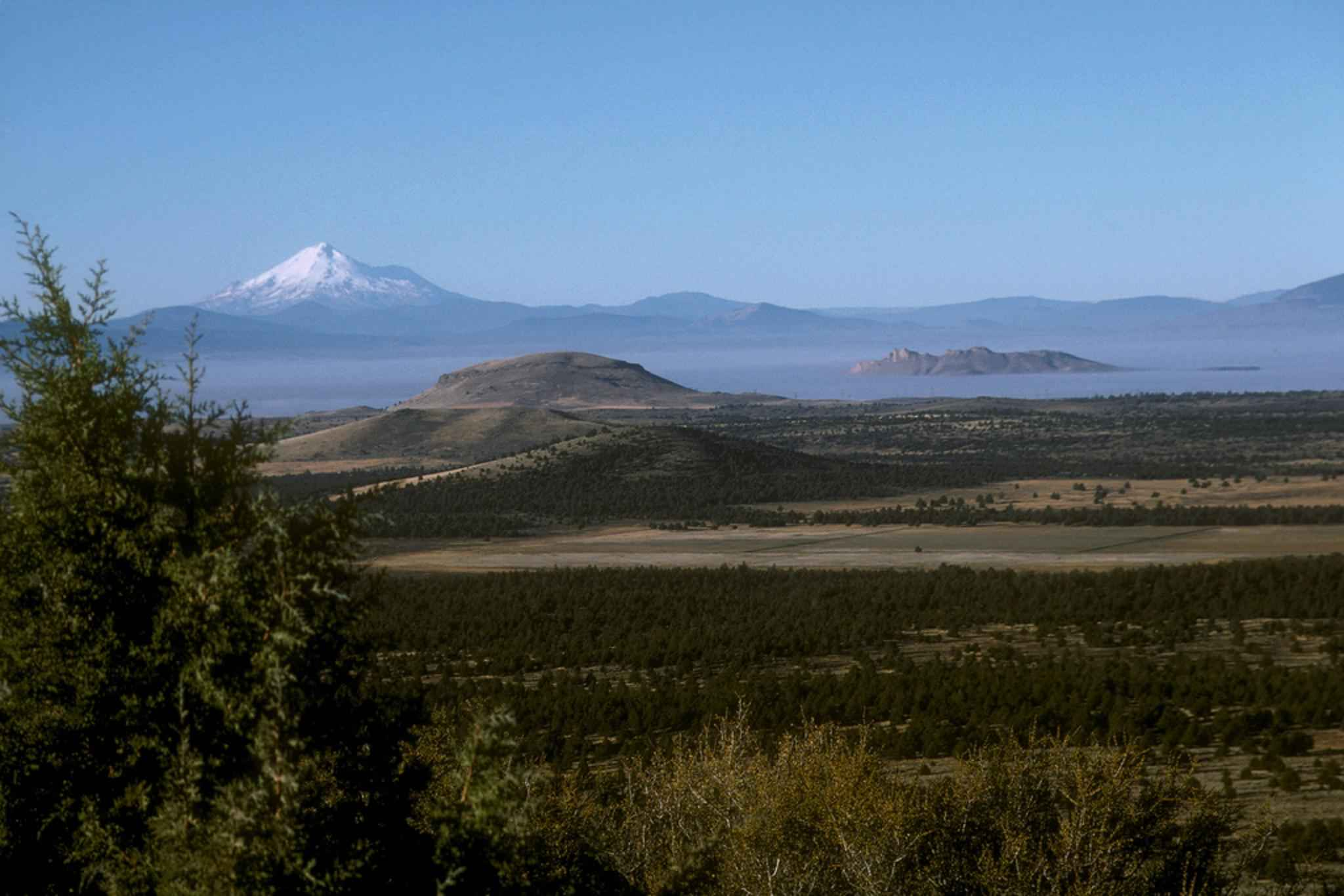
- Present-day Tule Lake basin

- Location within Oregon
- Interactive map of Lake Modoc
- Location: From Modoc and Siskiyou County, California to Jackson, Klamath and Lake County, Oregon near Upper Klamath Lake, Lower Klamath Lake and Tule Lakes
- Coordinates: 42.4029°N 121.7484°W
- Type: Pluvial lake
- Basin countries: United States
- Max. length: 75 miles (121 km)
- Surface area: 1,096 square miles (2,840 km^{2})
- Surface elevation: 4,239 feet (1,292 m)

Lake Modoc is a former lake in California and Oregon, in the location of present-day Upper Klamath Lake, Lower Klamath Lake and Tule Lake. It existed during the Pliocene and Pleistocene epochs, its formation probably influenced by volcanism and faulting. The bed of the former lake had plentiful resources for early humans, and today it is used for agriculture.

== Background ==
It has been known for over a century that large lakes previously existed in the Western United States, most notably Nevada's Lake Lahontan and Utah's Lake Bonneville. Such lakes also formed in eastern Oregon, where present-day Malheur Lake and Goose Lake are remnants of former pluvial lakes. Lake Modoc was so named by Samuel N. Dicken, professor of geography at the University of Oregon. The region of Lake Modoc was first described during the early and mid-19th century.

== The lake ==
Lake Modoc was a pluvial lake that existed during the Pleistocene in basins formed by faulting and volcanism. It covered a length of 75 miles (121 km) from south of Tule Lake in California to near present-day Fort Klamath in Oregon, its waters reaching an elevation of about 4,239 feet (1,292 m) above sea level and covering an area of about 1,096 square miles (2,840 km^{2}) with a highly irregular shape. Several islands formed in the lake, such as the Klamath Hills, present-day Miller Hill close to Klamath Falls and Turkey Hill close to Malin. The shoreline of Lake Modoc is well visible close to Tule Lake.

=== Hydrology ===
Unlike other pluvial lakes, Lake Modoc had a steady inflow of surface water, owing to its proximity to snow- and glacier-covered mountains of the Cascade Range. Its watershed extended over present-day Modoc and Siskiyou counties (both in California), and Jackson, Klamath and Lake counties (all in Oregon), including the Williamson River, Sprague River and Lost River. Cinder, pumice and volcanic ash from the Cascades filled the lake.

Lake Modoc also featured an outflow, at first to the south before a lava flow blocked it, although seepage continued from there to this day. Presently, the Klamath River drains the area. Given that the basin at present cannot hold a lake the size of Lake Modoc, it is likely that its formation and demise was influenced by the existence of outlets.

== History ==
Lake Modoc was probably formed by geologic processes such as faulting or by the Medicine Lake Volcano blocking a former southward-draining outlet. The lake appears to have existed during the Pleistocene and late Pliocene, with some lake deposits estimated to be at least 3 million years old. During marine oxygen isotope stage 4, Lake Modoc was deep and cold. Volcanic eruptions formed tuff cones in the lake, such as at The Peninsula.

Water levels began to decrease as the Pleistocene ended, as the climate became drier and the outlet to the Klamath River lower. The former lake floor is nearly level, and the shoreline is almost unwarped. Today, Tule Lake, Upper Klamath Lake and Lower Klamath Lake remain from Lake Modoc; Upper Klamath Lake is the largest present-day lake in Oregon by surface area.

The floor of the drying lake featured deep soils and abundant vegetation, water and wildlife; thus it was quickly populated by humans who migrated there over 3,000 years ago. The former lake bed is now used as cropland, and agriculture is the most prevalent human land use in the region. Part of the southern shoreline has been covered by lava flows, and geologic processes have continued into the Holocene; the Glass Mountain lava flow was emplaced about 1,000 years ago, and some Holocene lava flows have been faulted.

== Works cited ==
- Dicken, SN (1980). "Pluvial Lake Modoc, Klamath County, Oregon, and Modoc and Siskiyou Counties, California" (PDF). Oregon Geology. 42 (11).
- Dicken, Samuel N.; Dicken, Emily F. (1985). The Legacy of Ancient Lake Modoc: A Historical Geography of the Klamath Lakes Basin.
