= Miller Creek (Klamath County, Oregon) =

Location
- Country: United States
- State: Oregon
- Region: Klamath County
- City: Bonanza

Physical characteristics
- Source: Gerber Dam
  - location: northwest of Langell Valley
  - coordinates: 42°12′36″N 121°7′48″W
  - elevation: 1,478 ft (450 m)
- Mouth: Lost River at Langell Valley
  - coordinates: 42°0′34″N 121°14′23″W
  - elevation: 1,262 ft (385 m)

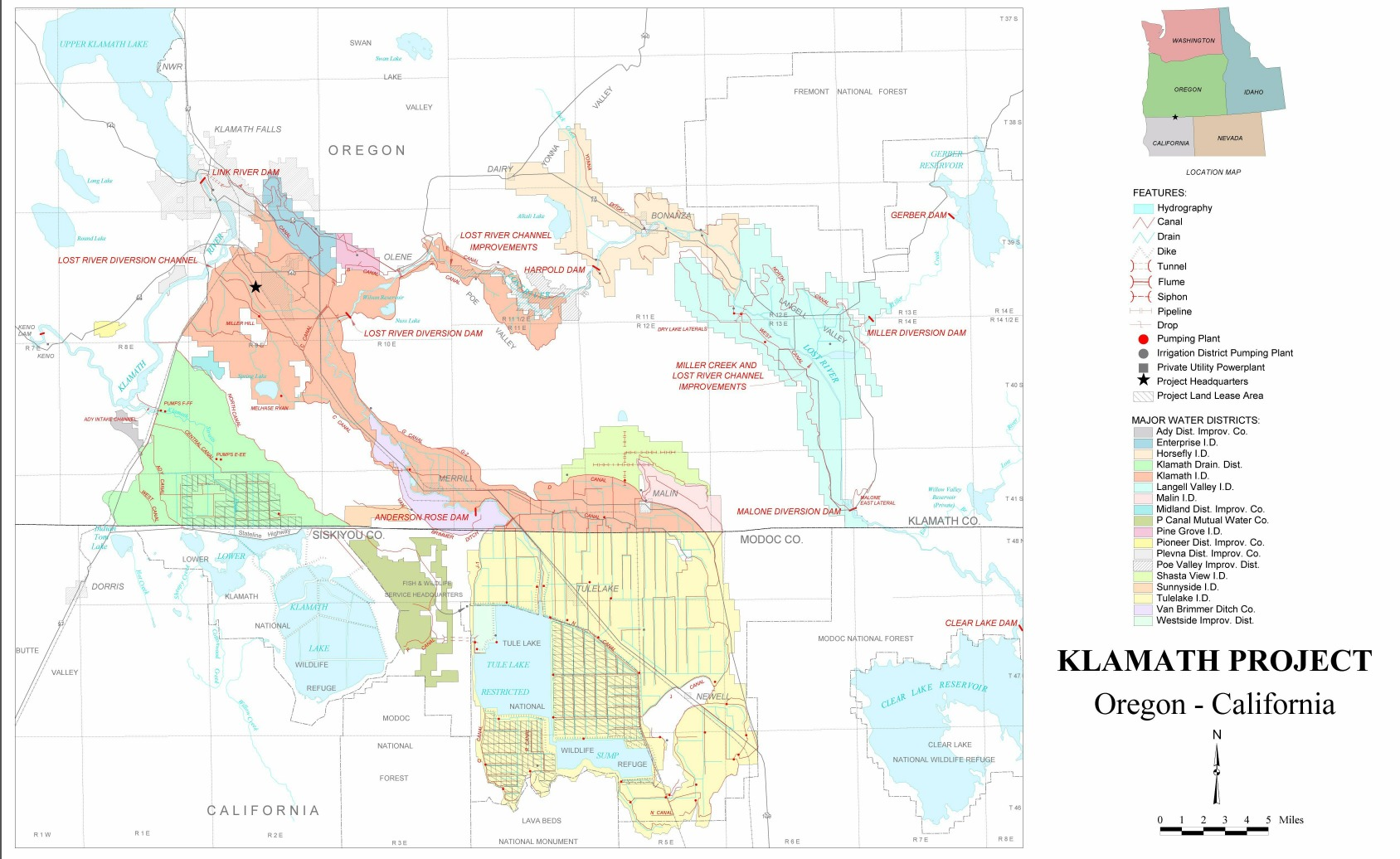
Miller Creek below Gerber Reservoir, part of the Klamath Project.

Miller Creek is a 7.6-mile-long (12.2 km) stream in western Klamath County, Oregon, United States. It originates above Gerber Reservoir and empties into irrigation canals within Langell Valley southeast of Bonanza and finally into the Lost River.

== Course ==
Miller Creek originates above Gerber Reservoir which is impounded by Gerber Dam east of the city of Bonanza. It descends southward to Langell Valley, where it turns into canals and pumping plants, paralleling the road to Miller Creek Road until it finally empties into the Lost River's mile 55.6 (km 89.5). There is on average a one-degree difference in temperature between Miller Creek and the Lost River at their confluence. Miller Creek has spatial variability in temperature thresholds, especially observed in the lower 4.7 miles (7.6 km) of the stream.

Gerber Reservoir, on Miller Creek, provides storage for irrigation and reduces flow into the reclaimed portions of Tulelake and the restricted Tule Lake Sumps in the Tule Lake National Wildlife Refuge.

== History ==
The name honors James Miller (1814–1890), an Irishman who came across the continent in 1844 with the Stephens-Townsend-Murphy Party and settled on part of Rancho San Pedro, Santa Margarita y Las Gallinas in 1845.

== Ecology ==
Although not well documented or understood, in recent years, Columbia River redband trout (Oncorhynchus mykiss gairdneri) have been identified in Miller Creek. The creek has been identified by the E.P.A., Klamath County Public Works, and the Oregon Department of Fish and Wildlife for trout restoration potential because the creek has high-quality, connected riparian habitat; minimal barriers to fish passage; and flow is subject to the operation of Gerber Dam. There is a high likelihood that these fish are coastal rainbow trout (Oncorhynchus mykiss irideus) of hatchery origin.

== See also ==
- List of rivers in Oregon
- Link River
