= Klamath Project =

Water-management project in the U.S. states of California and Oregon

Coordinates: 42.1°N 121.6°W

The Klamath Project is a water-management project developed by the United States Bureau of Reclamation to supply farmers with irrigation water and farmland in the Klamath Basin. The project also supplies water to the Tule Lake National Wildlife Refuge, and the Lower Klamath National Wildlife Refuge. The project was one of the first to be developed by the Reclamation Service, which later became the Bureau of Reclamation.

The two main water supply sources for the project are Upper Klamath Lake and the Klamath River. The main bodies of water in the Klamath Project are Clear Lake Reservoir, Klamath River, Link River, Lost River, Lower Klamath Lake, Tule Lake, and Upper Klamath Lake. The project fills these reservoirs from the spring runoff, peaking generally in March and April, and keeps the runoff from flooding the historical marshes that are a large portion of the present farmland. There are also many minor streams in the area. Lost River historically drained into Tule Lake, an endorheic lake. The project now diverts excess Lost River water to the Klamath River, allowing portions of Tule Lake to be reclaimed.

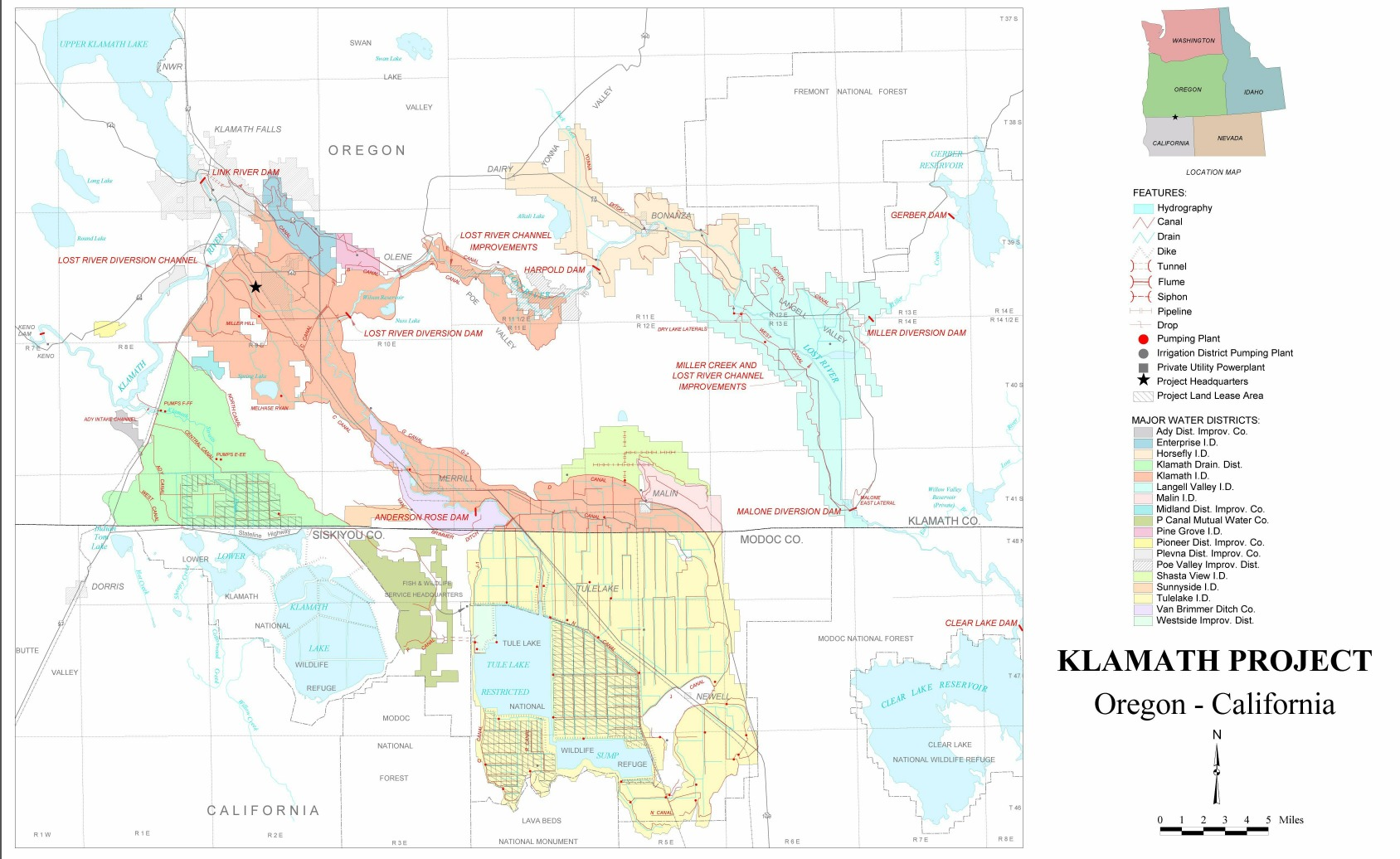
Map of Klamath Project

Some 225,000 acres (91,000 ha) of rangeland have been transformed into active farmland through the Klamath Project. Of that total, 80,000 acres (32,000 ha) were recovered by draining a portion of Lower Klamath Lake, a shallow marsh straddling the Oregon-California border between the California towns of Dorris and Tulelake. Tule Lake was also reduced in size by diverting water from Lost River to the Klamath River.

Farmers in the project raise barley, alfalfa hay, and other hay, oats, potatoes, and wheat. The Klamath Basin is on the Pacific Flyway and the Klamath Basin National Wildlife Refuges Complex is visited by migratory game birds every year.

The project must be distinguished from the Klamath River Hydroelectric Project, which is a set of hydro dams on the mainstem of the Klamath operated by for-profit energy company PacifiCorp. The Link River Dam belongs to both.

== History ==
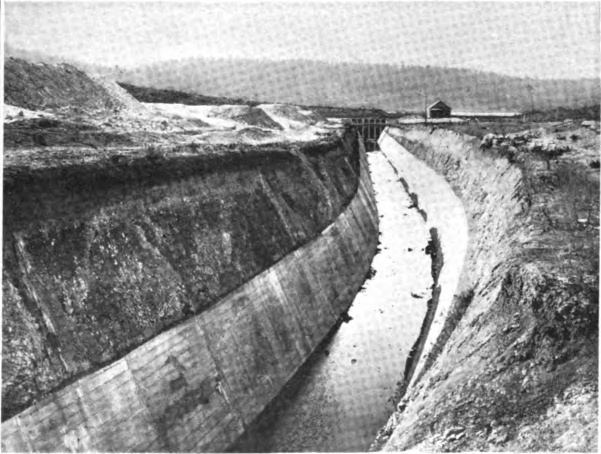
Klamath Project main canal, as depicted in the 1908 Report of the Oregon Conservation Commission.

Construction began on the project in 1906 with the building of the main "A" Canal. Water was first made available May 22, 1907. The Clear Lake Dam was completed in 1910, the Lost River Diversion Dam and many of the distribution structures in 1912, and the Anderson-Rose Diversion Dam (formally Lower Lost River Diversion Dam) in 1921. The Malone Diversion Dam on Lost River was built in 1923 to divert water to Langell Valley.

A contract executed February 24, 1917, between the California-Oregon Power Company (now Pacific Power) and the United States authorized the company to construct the Link River Dam for the benefit of the project and for the company's use, and in particular extended to the water users of the Klamath Project certain preferential power rates. The dam was completed in 1921.

In more recent times, the Klamath Project has been the focus of nationwide controversy. The Lost River and Shortnose suckers were listed as endangered in 1988. This, as well as concerns for salmon runs, led to a cutoff of irrigation water to local farmers on April 6, 2001. After many protests by farmers and concerned citizens alike, the decision was reversed the next year. The impact of the salmon kill was detailed in the book Salmon is Everything. A 2002 report by the National Research Council however, determined that the decision to stop delivery of irrigation water in 2001 was not scientifically justified and that the 2002 fish kill was caused by a combination of natural factors.

A massive die off of salmon occurred in 2002 due to low water and high temperatures in the lower reaches of the river during the salmon migration. Studies showed that drought conditions and low flow from the entire drainage were among the factors that caused a unique mix of conditions to allow a gill rot disease to attack the salmon population.

The conflict in balancing the economic and ecological concerns of the region was the focus of the 2006 book River of Renewal: Myth and History in the Klamath Basin. Today, there is still much antagonism between opposing sides on this issue.

== Engineering ==
=== Dams ===
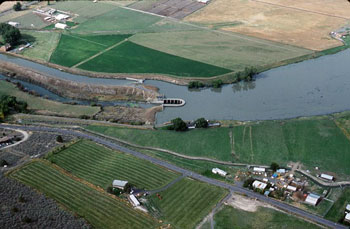
Lost River Diversion Dam, completed 1912

The Klamath Project contains seven dams, all of them on tributaries of the Klamath River itself. In chronological order of completion, they are:

- the Clear Lake Dam, completed in 1910, replaced 2002, for flood control and water storage. It impounds Lost River to form Clear Lake Reservoir
- the Lost River Diversion Dam, completed in 1912, diverts the waters of the Lost River into the Klamath, thereby controlling flow into the adjacent Tule Lake National Wildlife Refuge and reclaimed parts of the Tule Lake bed
- the Link River Dam, completed in 1921 for flood control, water storage, and hydro power. It impounds Link River to form Upper Klamath Lake
- the Anderson-Rose Diversion Dam, completed in 1921 as a diversion dam, on the Lost River close to Merrill, Oregon
- the Malone Diversion Dam, finished in 1923, on the upper Lost River
- the Miller Diversion Dam, completed in 1924, on Miller Creek, 8 miles (13 km) below Gerber Dam
- the Gerber Dam, completed in 1925 for water storage, impounding Miller Creek to form Gerber Reservoir

=== Canals ===
There are over 717 miles (1,154 km) of canals, laterals and diversion channels in the Klamath Project. The canals transport irrigation water from Klamath Lake and the Klamath River, Clear Lake and the Lost River, and Tule Lake. There are two tunnels: the "A" Canal (the main canal that starts just above the Link River Dam) has an underground section as it flows through Klamath Falls, and the Tule Lake Tunnel.

There are almost 728 miles (1,172 km) of drainage canals in the Klamath Project which allow land that would otherwise be wetlands to be farmed. The Lower Klamath Lake was 80,000 acres (32,000 ha) before it was drained and would naturally evaporate about 240,000 acre-feet (300,000,000 m^{3}) each summer. This is roughly equivalent to the annual delivery of the A canal.

=== Pumps ===
There are 28 pumping stations in the Klamath Project. These pumps have a total output of over 1937 ft^{3}/s (55 m^{3}/s).

== Water management ==
The Bureau must consider water needs for threatened coho salmon in the river, and two species of endangered sucker fish in Upper Klamath Lake. In 2001, a court order withheld irrigation water from Klamath Project farmers, to comply with mandated river levels for the threatened Coho salmon and the endangered Lost River Sucker. Downstream populations of Coho salmon are within the Southern Oregon/Northern California Evolutionary Significant Unit and are listed as threatened (2011).

The 2010 Klamath Basin Restoration Agreement (KBRA) is a multi-party legal agreement determining river usage and water rights involving the Klamath River, the Klamath Project, and the Klamath Basin, within the states of California and Oregon. Among the more notable signatories to the agreement were the Governors of California and Oregon, and the Chairman of the Klamath Tribes.

As opposed to the government-owned irrigation dams of the Klamath Project on upper tributaries, the seven dams of the Klamath River Hydroelectric Project are operated by for-profit energy company PacifiCorp. The systems share one facility, the Link River Dam, which is owned by the United States Bureau of Reclamation but operated by PacifiCorp primarily to regulate its own downstream water supply, and secondarily for power generation.
