= Gerber Dam =

Dam in Klamath County, Oregon, United States

Coordinates: 42°12′05″N 121°07′48″W

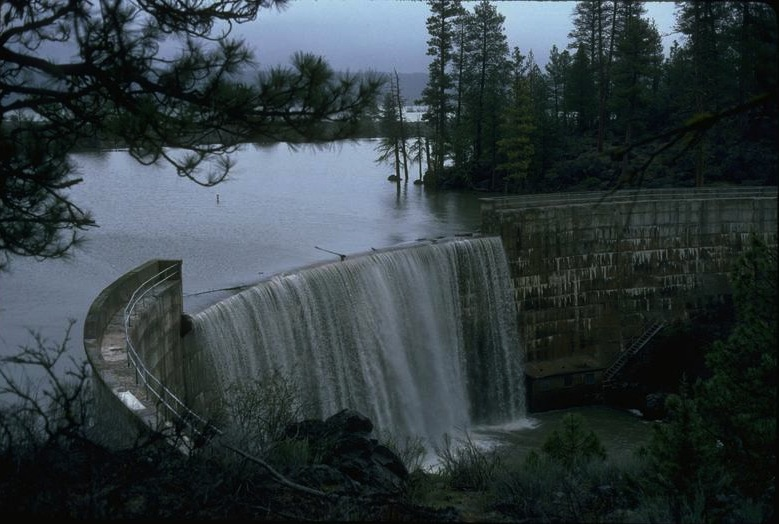
Gerber Dam

Gerber Dam is a concrete arch dam located 14 miles east of Bonanza, Oregon, and about 12 miles north of the California border, in Klamath County, Oregon.

The dam was completed in 1925 by the United States Bureau of Reclamation as part of the Klamath Project. It provides irrigation storage but no hydroelectric power, and it reduces flow into the downstream Tule Lake National Wildlife Refuge in California. The dam has a height of 84 feet and is 460 feet long at the crest.

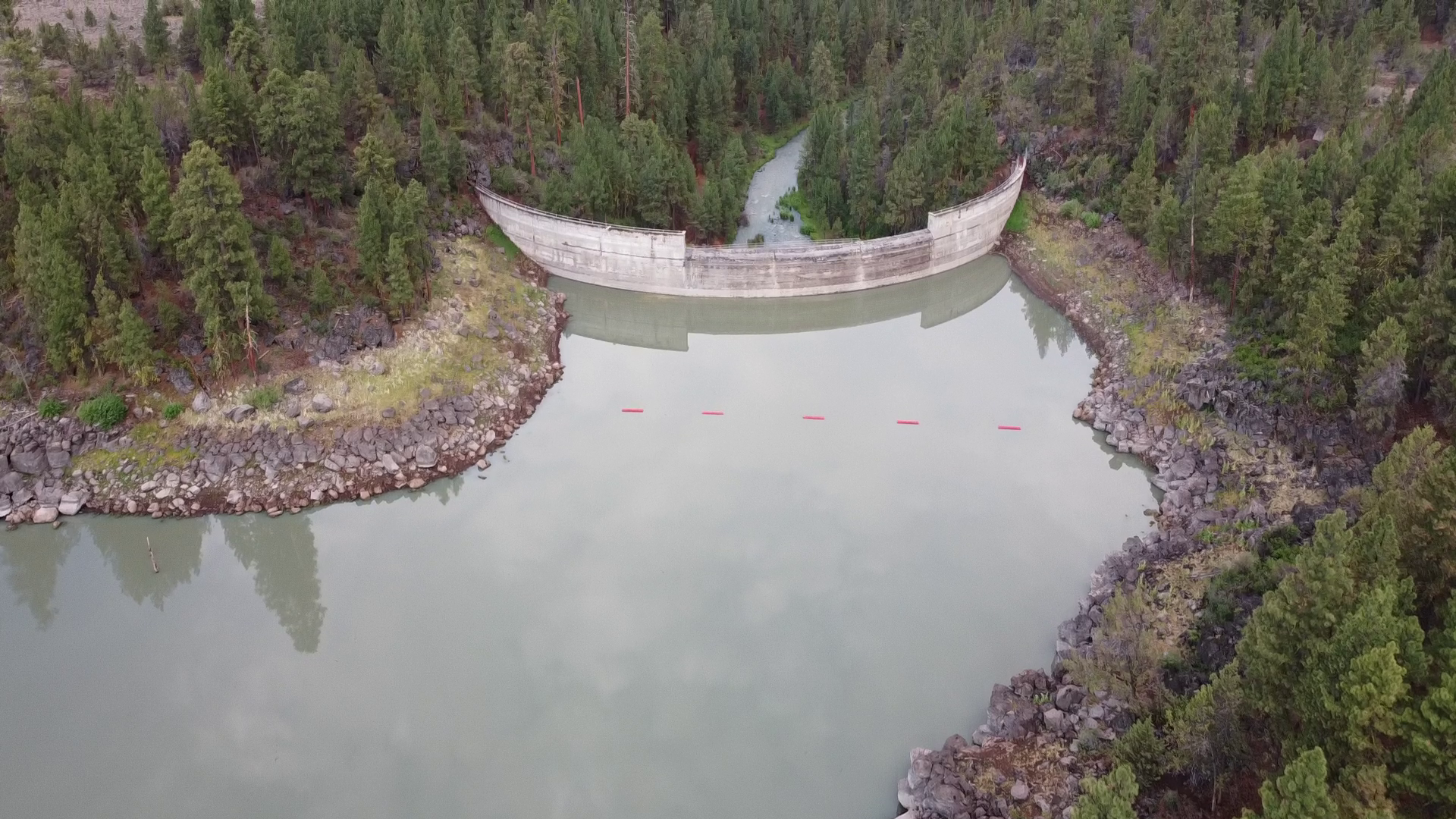
Gerber Reservoir dam

Gerber Reservoir, formed by impounding Miller Creek, contains 94,300 acre-feet of water. The reservoir is a popular recreation area.
