= Clear Lake Reservoir =

Artificial lake in Modoc County, northern California, United States

- Location within California Location within the United States
- Location: Modoc County, California
- Coordinates: 41.860°N 121.146°W
- Type: reservoir
- Primary inflows: Lost River
- Primary outflows: Lost River
- Basin countries: United States
- Managing agency: United States Bureau of Reclamation
- Surface area: 25,760 acres (10,420 ha)
- Water volume: 527,000 acre⋅ft (0.650 km^{3})

Clear Lake Reservoir is a reservoir in the Klamath Basin and the Modoc National Forest, in northwestern Modoc County, California.

It is part of the Klamath Project. and about 40 mi (64 km) northwest of Alturas. It is formed by Clear Lake Dam on the Lost River, a tributary of the Klamath River, and has a capacity of 527,000 acre-feet (650,000,000 m^{3}).

== Clear Lake Dam ==
The original dam was constructed of rockfill and completed in 1910. It was 42 feet (13 m) tall from the bottom of the foundation to the crest, 32 ft (10 m) if measured from the crest to the original stream bed. It was replaced with a concrete dam near the old dam in 2002. The old dam had deteriorated and the water level was kept low to prevent it from failing. Its crest is at the same height as the old dam and the reservoir's capacity is about the same. The dam is owned by the United States Bureau of Reclamation.

The dam and reservoir were created to reduce flows into the reclaimed wetlands of Tule Lake. It also reduces flows into Tule Lake Sumps in the Tule Lake National Wildlife Refuge.

The reservoir created by the dam has a very large surface area, 25,760 acres (104.2 km^{2}), and its average depth at maximum capacity is only about 20 feet (6 m), so it has a very high rate of evaporation. In 1998, the reservoir lost 74,500 acre-feet (91,900,000 m^{3}) of water due to evaporation, more than any other lake in the state besides Shasta Lake, which has over 8 times the volume. Because of this, Clear Lake Reservoir is not an efficient water storage reservoir. This is a problem, since the dam now provides water for irrigation in the eastern half of the Klamath Project.

The reservoir is in Modoc National Forest and Clear Lake National Wildlife Refuge, so recreation opportunities are limited.

== See also ==
- List of dams and reservoirs in California
- List of largest reservoirs of California
- List of lakes in California
