= Keuchishkeni, California =

Keuchishkeni is a former Modoc settlement described by the GNIS to be in Modoc County, California, United States. Its precise location is unknown, though in 1907 it was described as a camping place on Hot Creek, near Little Klamath Lake. Note that Little Klamath Lake is a variant name of Lower Klamath Lake, which is in Siskiyou County, not Modoc County.
