= Eagle Ridge County Park =

Coordinates: 42°24′19″N 121°56′57″W

Eagle Ridge County Park is a member of the Klamath County, Oregon, parks system. It is located on the Eagle Ridge peninsula fifteen miles west of Klamath Falls. Access is via four miles of gravel road. It consists of 634.88 acres of land, mostly hilly, on the shore of Upper Klamath Lake and Shoalwater Bay.

Wildlife commonly seen in the area of the park include hawks, pelicans and other water birds, including Clark’s, Western, and eared grebes and black tern. Numbered among the forest birds are western tanager, yellow-rumped warbler, house wren, chipping sparrow, and Cassin's vireo. The park is site number 170 on the Oregon Cascades Birding Trail

Hunting is not allowed in the park, though fishing is permitted, and there's a boat ramp. Beyond the main area of the park a primitive dirt track continues a couple miles further, out to Eagle Point, where there are several campsites suitable for tent camping. Terrain is grassland and pine forest.

In 1951 land purchases began for the Klamath Wildlife Area, and the part currently making up Eagle Ridge Park was transferred to the county in 1952.
