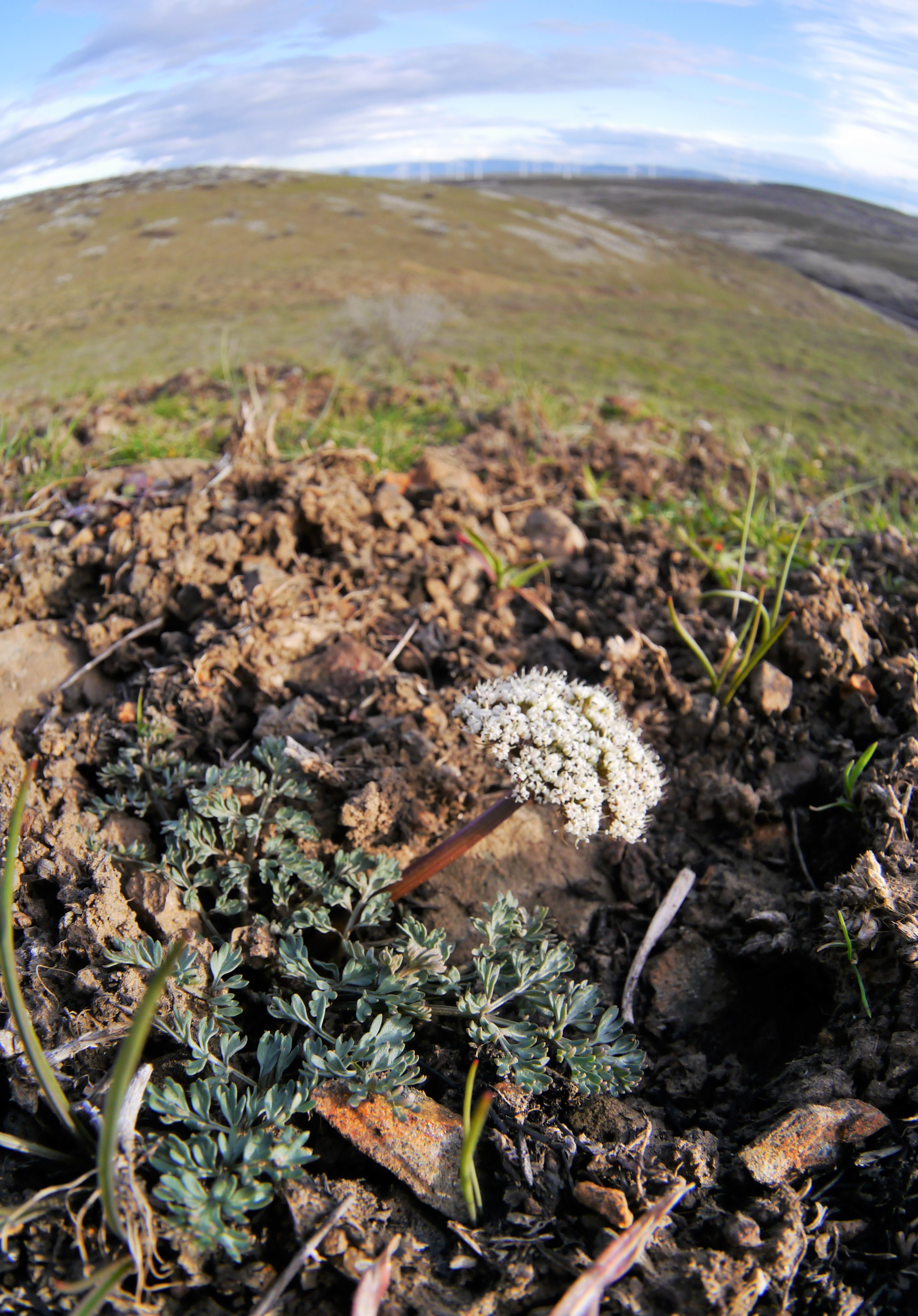
- At Quilomene Wildlife Area near Old Vantage Highway, Kittitas County Washington

Scientific classification
- Kingdom: Plantae
- Clade: Tracheophytes
- Clade: Angiosperms
- Clade: Eudicots
- Clade: Asterids
- Order: Apiales
- Family: Apiaceae
- Genus: Lomatium
- Species: L. canbyi

Binomial name
- Lomatium canbyi J.M.Coult. & Rose

= Lomatium canbyi =

Species of flowering plant

Lomatium canbyi is a species of flowering plant in the carrot family known by the common name Canby's biscuitroot (lúukš in the Sahaptin language and qeqíit in the Nez Perce language). It is native to the Pacific Northwest of the United States and northeast California, where it grows east of the Cascade ridge in sagebrush-covered plateau habitat and barren flats.

== Description ==
Lomatium canbyi is a perennial herb with flower stalks up to about 25 centimeters tall. It lacks a stem, producing compound leaves and inflorescences from ground level. The hairless leaves are up to 15 centimeters long and divided into many highly divided leaflets usually with a glaucous or slightly bluish color. The leaves are often held parallel to and close to the ground. The inflorescence is stout and is topped with a dense compound umbel up to 6 cm wide, composed of many small white flowers with dark anthers. The primary umbel (involucre) has no bracts and the secondary umbel (involucel) has narrow bractlets that wither to become inconspicuous as the flower ages.

== Uses ==
The Klamath and Modoc peoples use the roots of this plant as food.

== Gallery ==
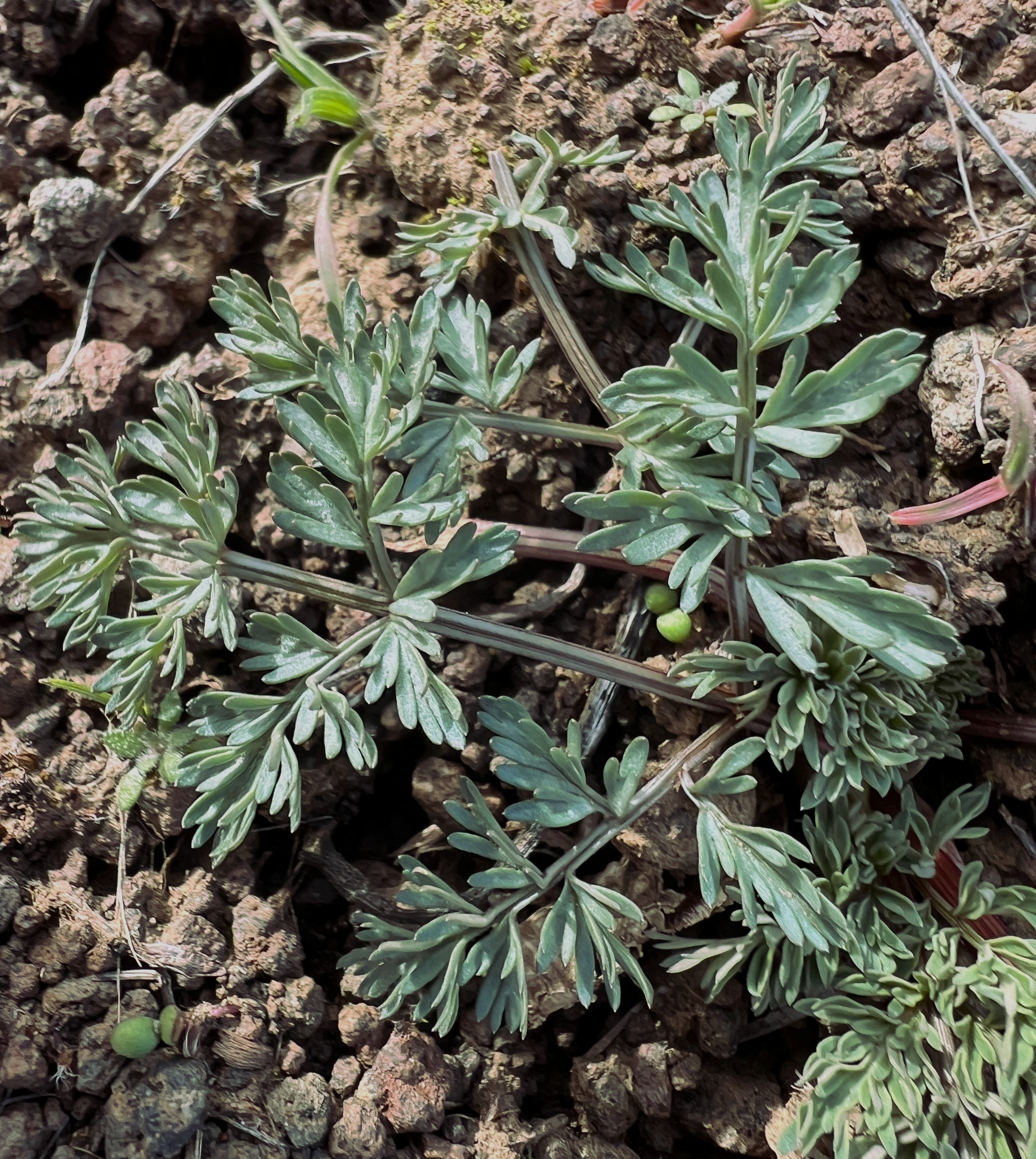
Leaf

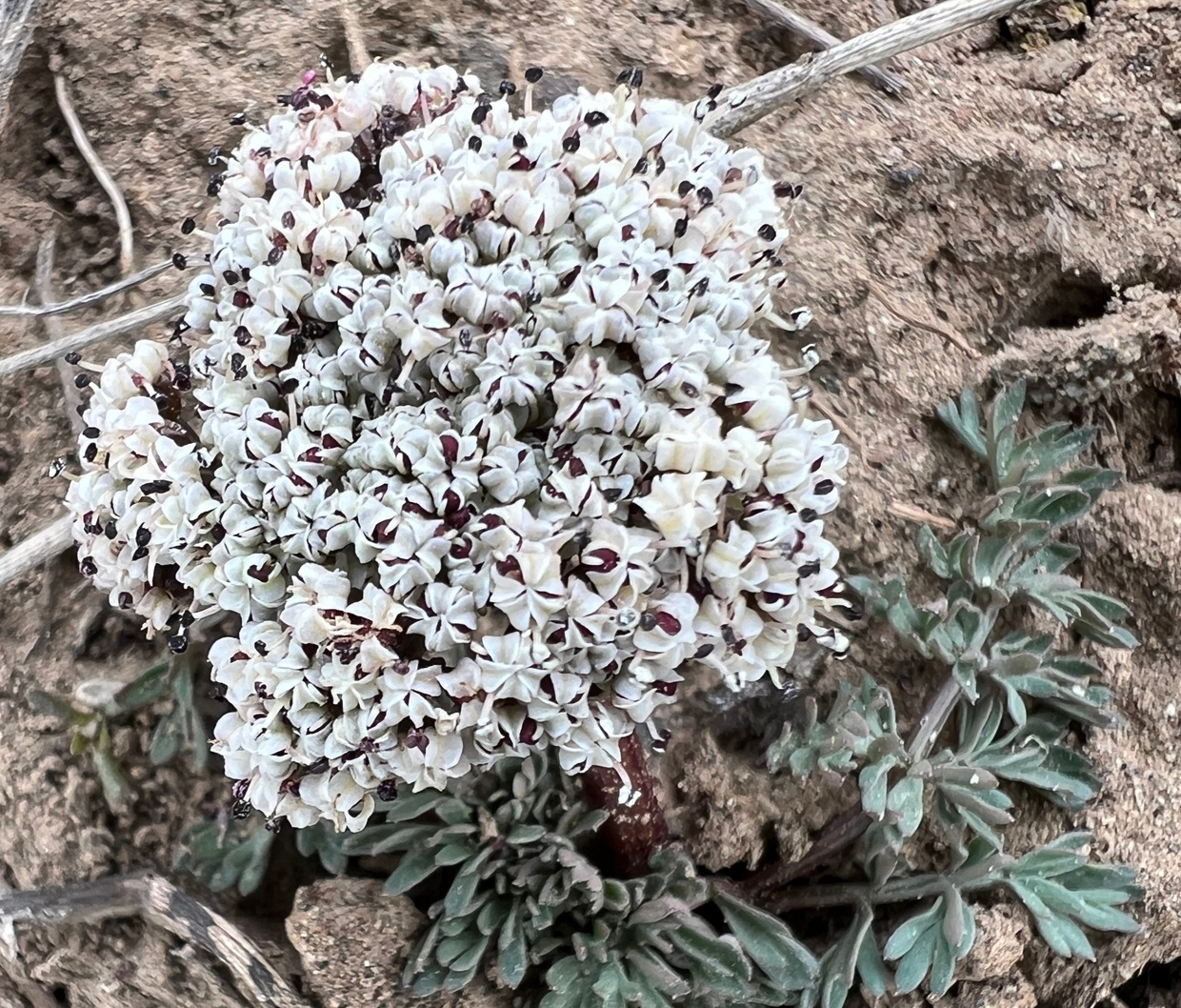
Flower umbel

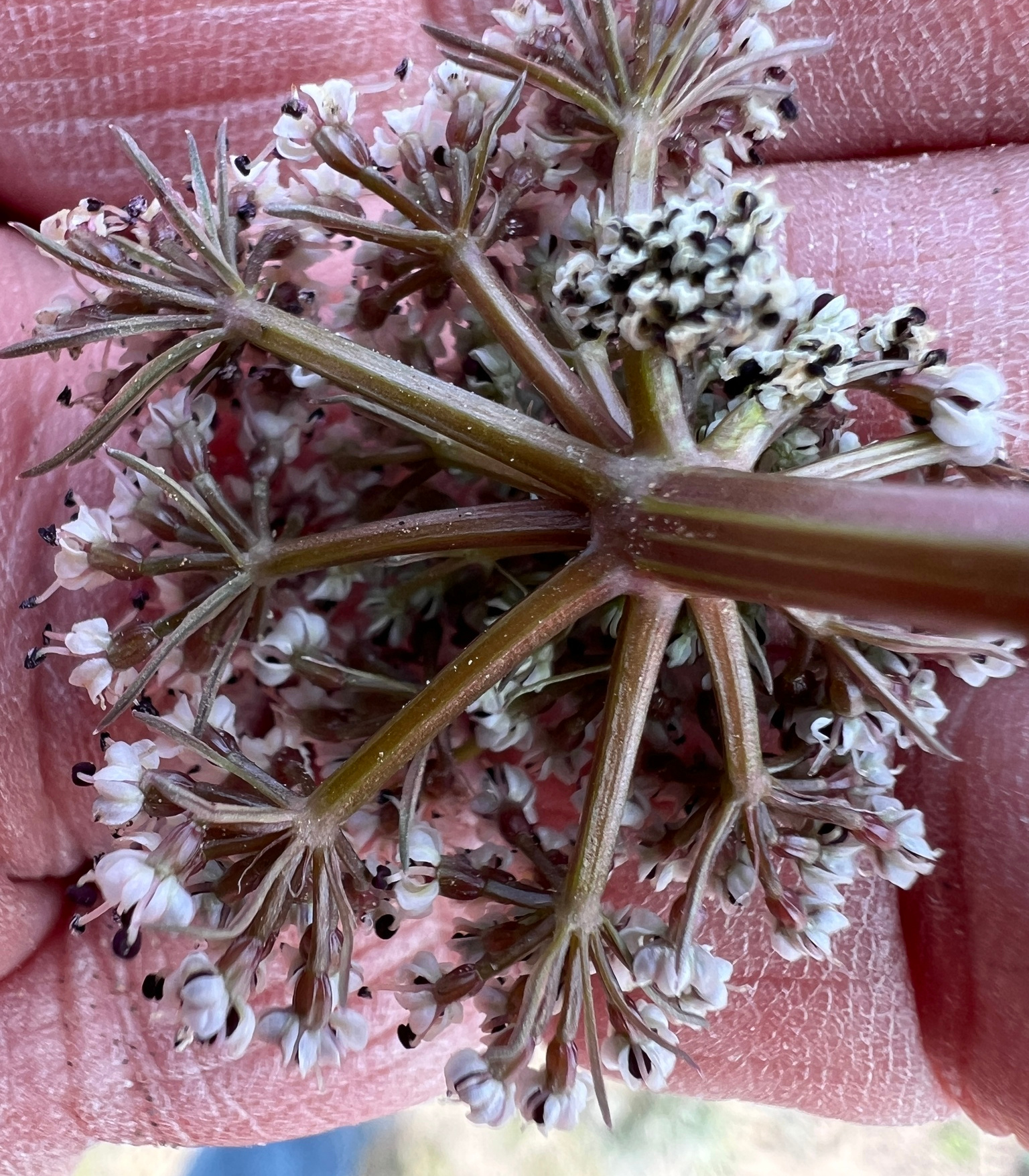
Flower umbel, bottom view
