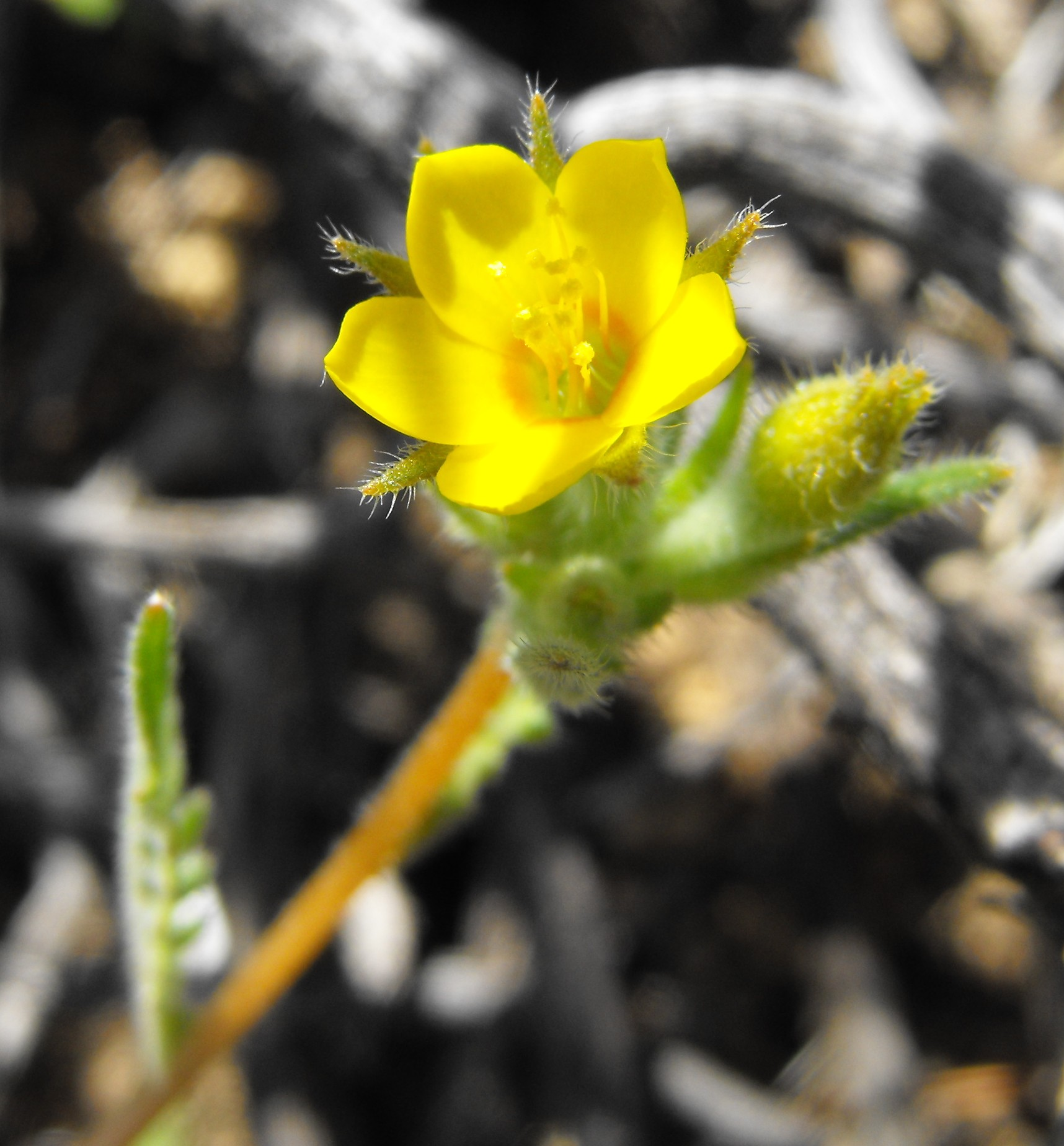

Scientific classification
- Kingdom: Plantae
- Clade: Embryophytes
- Clade: Tracheophytes
- Clade: Spermatophytes
- Clade: Angiosperms
- Clade: Eudicots
- Clade: Asterids
- Order: Cornales
- Family: Loasaceae
- Genus: Mentzelia
- Species: M. albicaulis

Binomial name
- Mentzelia albicaulis (Douglas ex Hook.) Douglas ex Torr. & A.Gray

Synonyms
- List: Acrolasia albicaulis (Douglas ex Hook.) Rydb.; Bartonia albicaulis Douglas ex Hook.; Mentzelia albicaulis var. genuina Urb. & Gilg

= Mentzelia albicaulis =

Plant species in the chile-nettle family

Mentzelia albicaulis is a species of flowering plants in the family Loasaceae known by the common names whitestem blazingstar, white-stemmed stickleaf, and small flowered blazing star. It is native to much of western North America, where it grows in mountain, desert, and plateau habitats.

== Description ==
It is an annual herb producing a stem up to 42 centimeters long, sometimes growing upright. The leaves are up to 11 centimeters long in the basal rosette, divided into even comblike lobes, and smaller higher up on the plant. The flower has five shiny yellow petals 2 to 7 millimeters long each. The fruit is a narrow, straight or curving utricle 1 to 3 centimeters long. It contains many angular seeds covered in tiny bumps.

== Taxonomy ==
Mentzelia albicaulis was first scientifically described in 1832 by William Jackson Hooker, crediting David Douglas, but as a species in the genus Bartonia. In 1840 it was moved to Mentzelia by John Torrey and Asa Gray, who also credited Douglas. Together with its genus it is classified in the Loasaceae family.

=== Conservation ===
Though native to North America this species has not been evaluated by NatureServe and assigned a conservation status at the global level.
