= Upper Klamath Lake =

Large lake in southern Oregon, United States

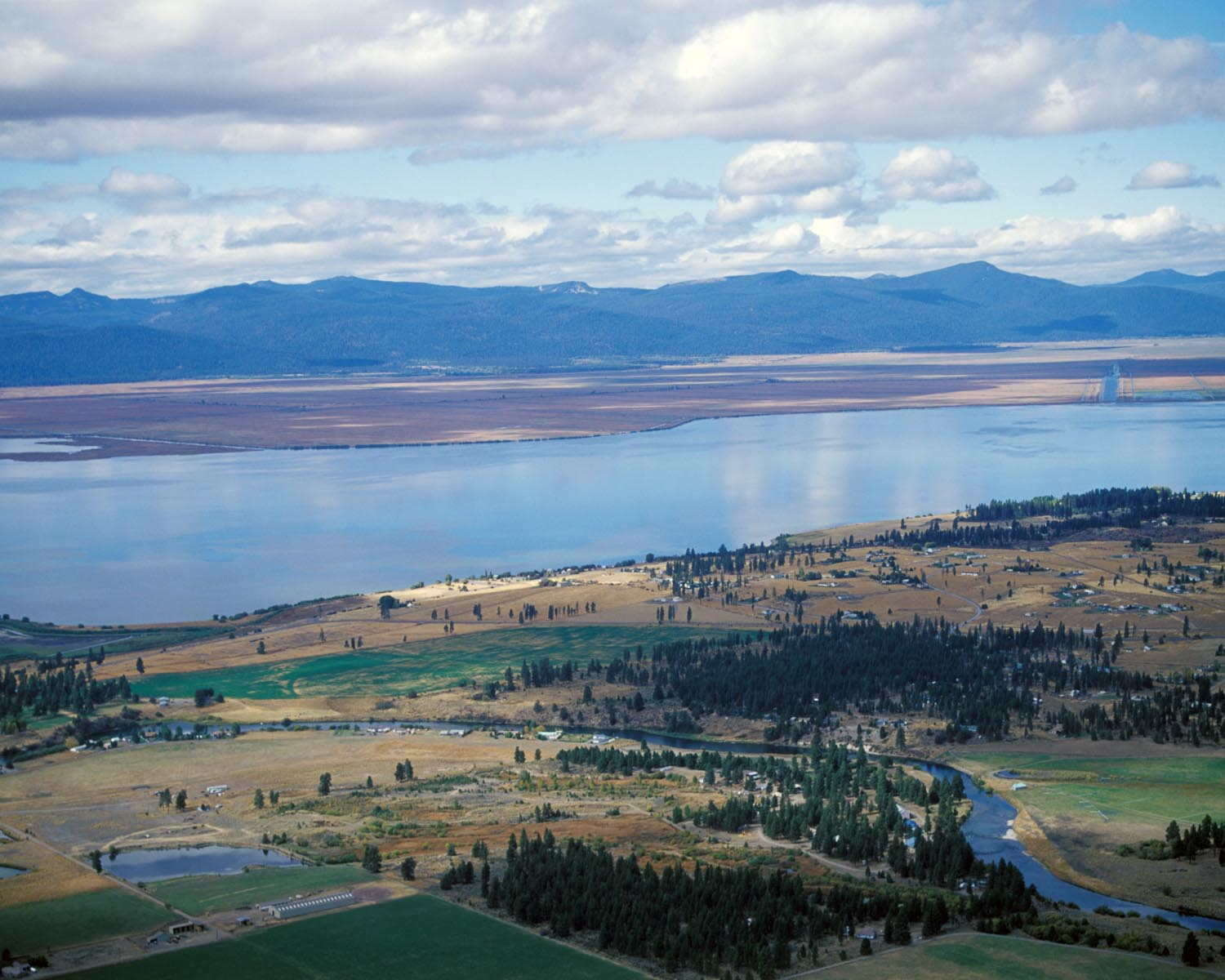
- Aerial view of Williamson River and Agency Lake

- Location of Upper Klamath Lake in Oregon Upper Klamath Lake (the United States)

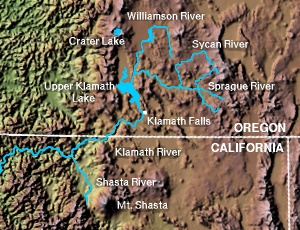
- Upper Kalamath Lake Watershed
- Location: Klamath County, Oregon, United States
- Coordinates: 42°23′32″N 121°52′49″W
- Lake type: Hypereutrophic
- Primary inflows: Williamson River, Wood River, Crooked Creek, Fourmile Creek
- Primary outflows: Link River
- Catchment area: 3,768 mi^{2} (9,760 km^{2})
- Basin countries: United States
- Max. length: 20 mi (32 km)
- Max. width: 8 mi (13 km)
- Surface area: 61,543 acres (24,906 ha)
- Average depth: 14 ft (4.3 m)
- Water volume: 849,290 acre⋅ft (1.04758 km^{3})
- Residence time: 0.5 months
- Shore length^{1}: 87.8 mi (141.3 km)
- Surface elevation: 4,140 ft (1,260 m)
- ^{1} Shore length is not a well-defined measure.

Upper Klamath Lake (sometimes called Klamath Lake) (Klamath-Modoc: ?ews, 'lake') is a large, shallow freshwater lake east of the Cascade Range in south-central Oregon in the United States. The largest body of fresh water by surface area in Oregon, it is approximately 25 miles (40 km) long and 8 miles (13 km) wide and extends northwest from the city of Klamath Falls. It sits at an average elevation of 4,140 feet (1,260 m).

In the early 20th century, most of the wetlands and marshes surrounding the lake were drained for agricultural purposes, damaging the larger habitat. The lake's water has been used to support the federal Klamath Project for irrigation by local farmers for a century. The lake depth fluctuates due to regulation of its water supply, averaging between 8 and 50 feet (2.4 and 15.2 m) deep. The lake level is kept within 4,137 to 4,143 ft (1,261 to 1,263 m) above sea level to ensure a viable fishery in the lake and to protect coho salmon in the Klamath River below the lake.

Upper Klamath Lake is fed by a watershed of 3,768 square miles (9,760 km^{2}) including the Williamson and Wood Rivers, and is drained by the Klamath River (known here as the Link River), which issues from the south end of the lake. The lake is connected by a short channel to the smaller Agency Lake to the north. The Upper Klamath National Wildlife Refuge has been established on land along the northern edge of the lake to preserve natural habitat.

== Geology ==
Upper Klamath Lake is the largest remnant of Lake Modoc, a giant pluvial lake that existed in the region until about 10,000 years ago. At its largest, Lake Modoc covered over 1,000 square miles (2,600 km^{2}), joining Upper Klamath, Lower Klamath, and Tule Lakes, as well as all of the major wetlands in the upper Klamath River basin, into a contiguous body of water. The lake was more than ten times the size of present-day Upper Klamath Lake and sat nearly 100 feet (30 m) higher in elevation. Lake Modoc disappeared at the end of the Pleistocene due to a warming and drying climate.

== History ==
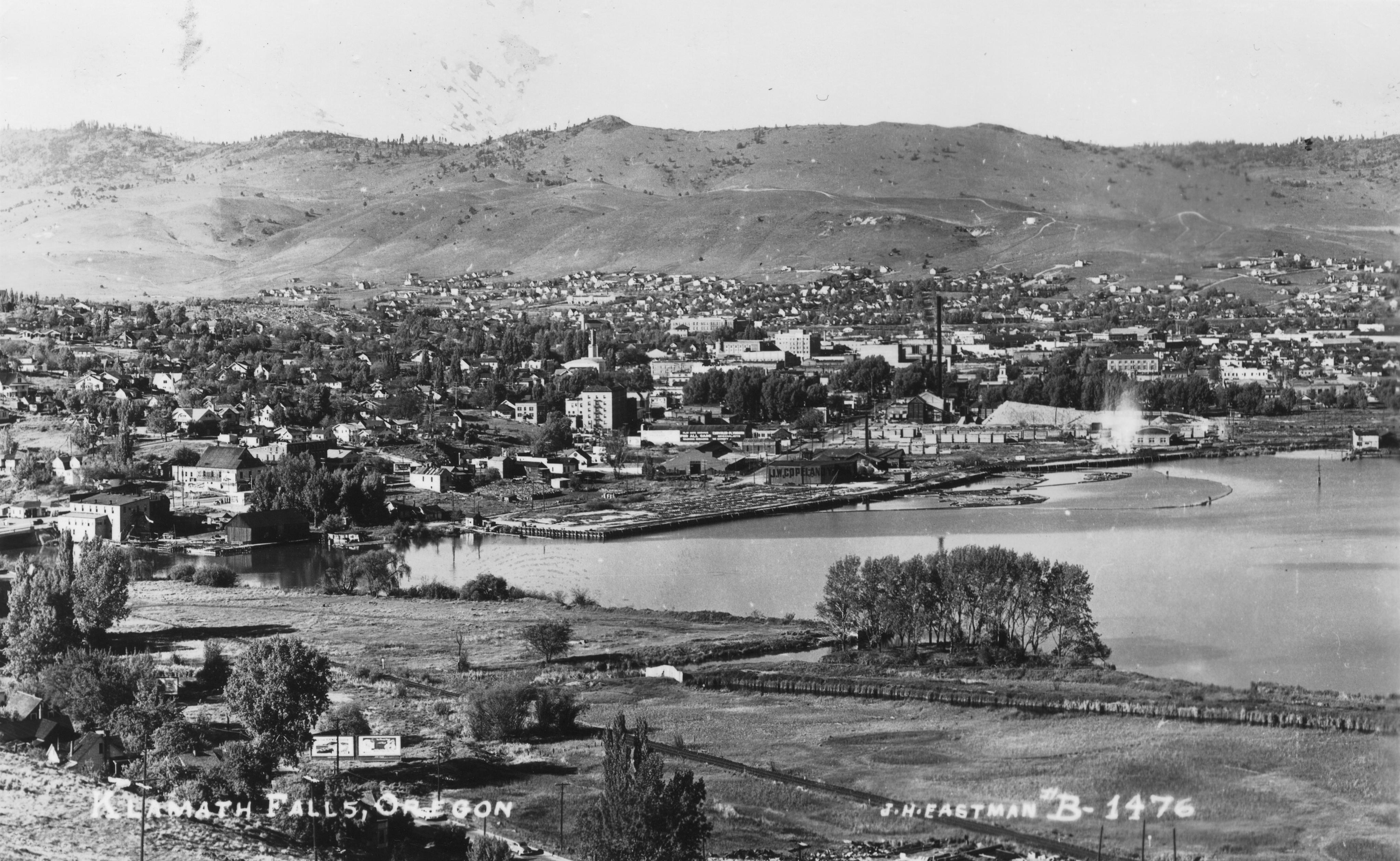
Klamath Falls and Lake Ewauna in 1930

The region around Upper Klamath Lake and the Williamson, Sprague and Wood rivers to the north of the lake were originally inhabited by the Klamath people. The Modoc people inhabited the lands to the south of Upper Klamath Lake, around the Lower Klamath and Tule lakes.

The first recorded persons of European descent to visit Upper Klamath Lake were a party of Hudson's Bay Company fur trappers commanded by Peter Skene Ogden in December 1826. Ogden called the lake "Dog Lake", after obtaining nine dogs from the local Klamaths for food. They explored the lake and the Klamath River headwaters, helped by native guides. However, they did not stay in the area for long, instead moving south to tributaries of the Klamath River in search of beaver.

Animosity between American immigrants and Native Americans led to armed conflicts. In 1846, a military expedition led by John C. Frémont and Kit Carson were attacked by Native American warriors near Upper Klamath Lake. In revenge, Frémont and Carson's party attacked a local village, killing fourteen people.

As more settlers entered the region, the Modoc people resisted by raiding parties along the South Emigrant Trail, which passed through the Klamath River Valley south of Upper Klamath Lake. In 1873, the Native Americans were defeated in the Modoc War, and were relocated to a reservation on the north side of the lake.

Being naturally eutrophic, the lake has been known since early times for its poor water quality. Frémont noted the "often foul smelling waters" of the lake, and the Applegate Trail was purposely routed away from the lake because the water was "so bad that it might be too dangerous for livestock to drink late in the season".

Starting in the mid-1800s, the valleys both north and south of Upper Klamath were settled and developed for agriculture. Since 1917, the water level in the lake has been regulated by the United States Bureau of Reclamation (BOR)'s Link River Dam as part of the Klamath Reclamation Project, to supply irrigation waters to support agriculture in the upper Klamath Basin. The original timber crib dam was replaced by a more permanent concrete structure in 1921.

== Ecology ==
Prior to the 20th century, the lake was surrounded by widespread marshes and wetlands, which supported fish, birds and wildlife, as well as protecting water quality in the lake. Much of these important habitats were drained to be converted to cultivated farmland, as farmers did not understand the value of the wetlands for the environment. The lake is naturally eutrophic, due to a high concentration of nutrients. In the 20th century, the augmentation of nutrients by agricultural runoff from the surrounding farming valley has caused the lake to become hypereutrophic, resulting in blue-green algae blooms over the lake (largely Aphanizomenon flos-aquae). The algae blooms turn the water an opaque green in the summer and reduce the opportunity for recreational uses of the lake. State standards for dissolved oxygen are routinely violated, meaning that fish are endangered. The lake is still a vital stop for waterfowl along the Pacific Flyway, and is known for its rainbow trout fishery.

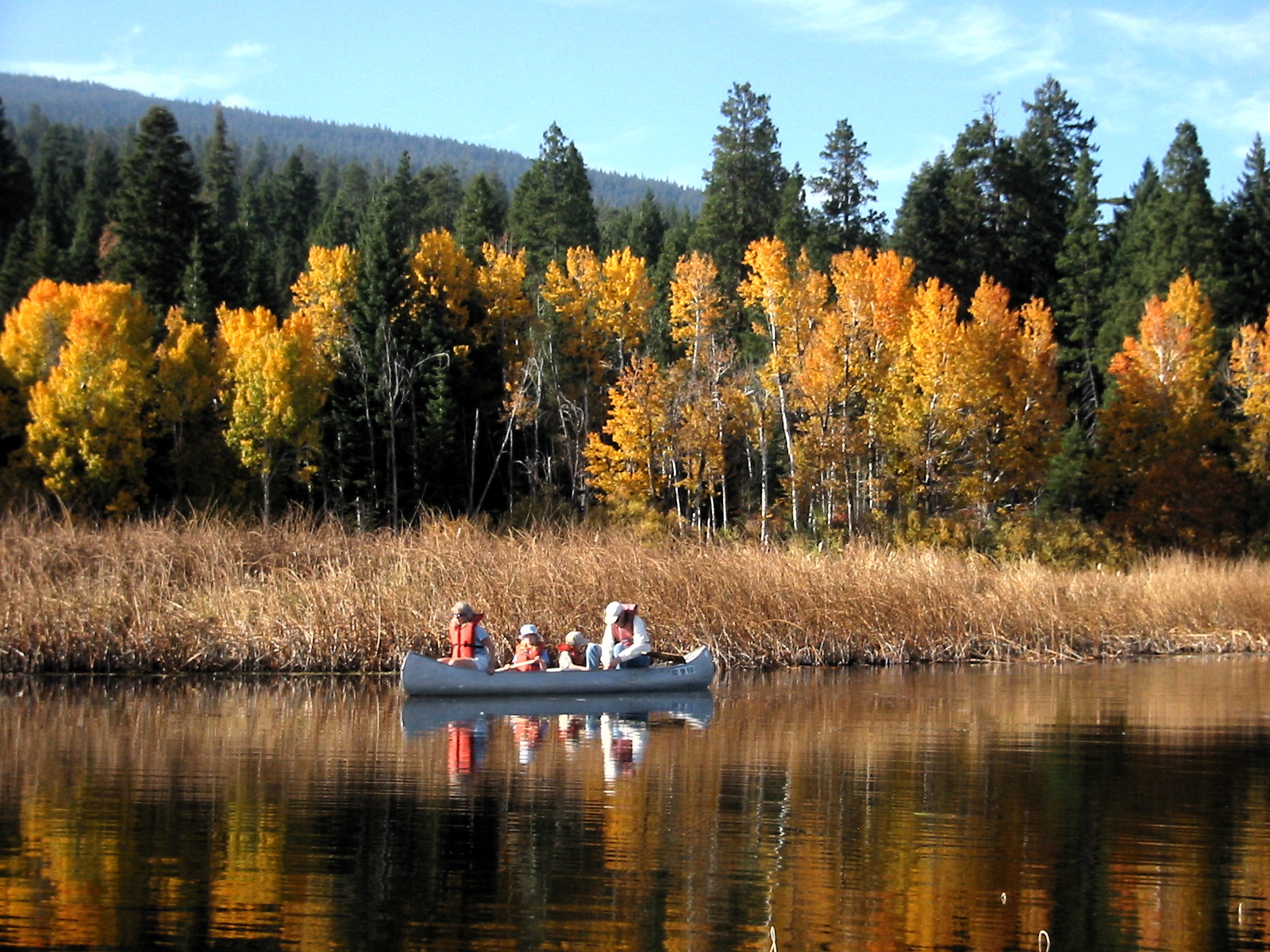
Canoe trail

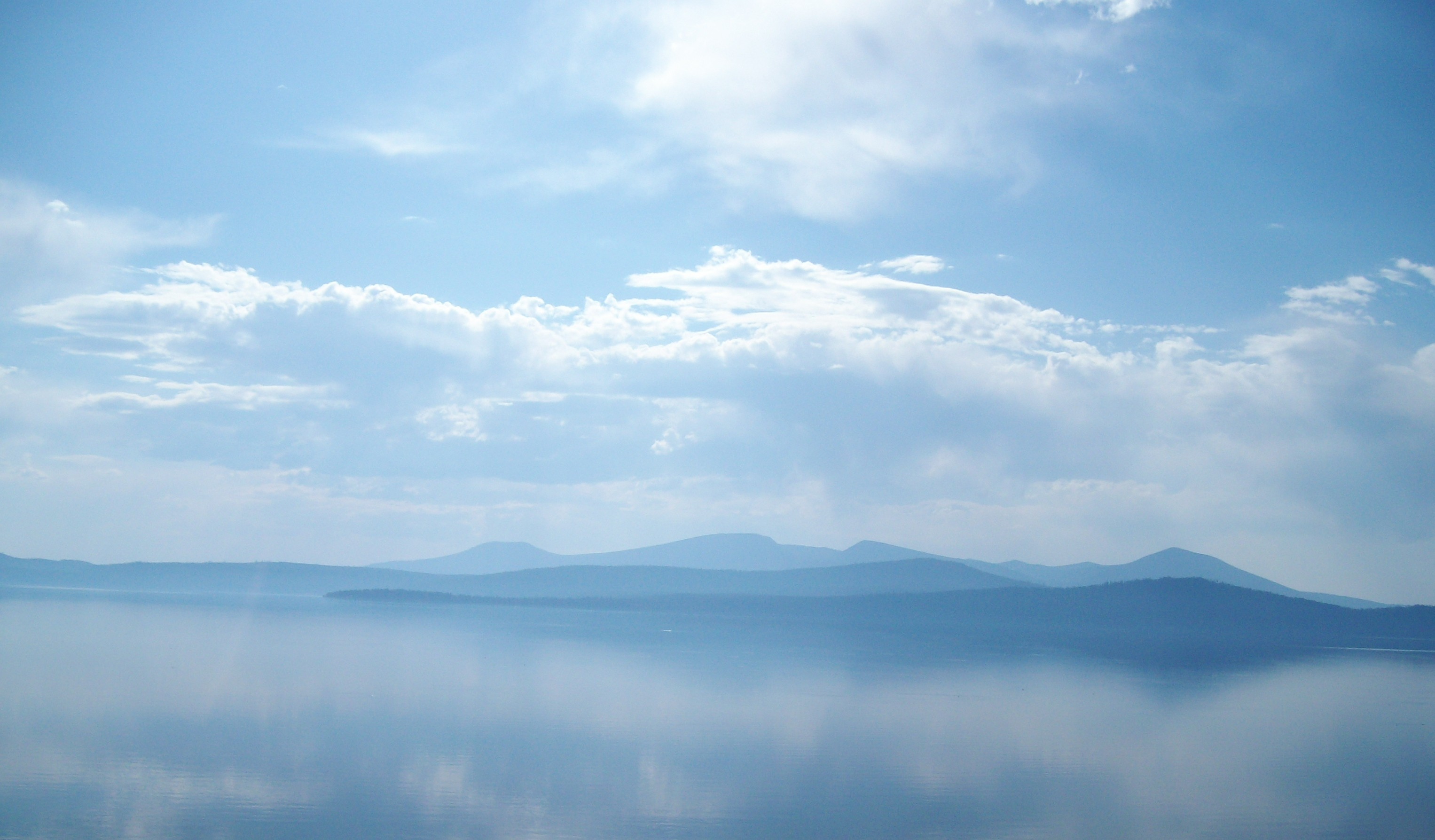
Upper Klamath Lake

The US Fish and Wildlife Service (FWS) is responsible for protecting and maintaining sucker populations in the lake. In 1988, the FWS placed the Lost River sucker and the shortnose sucker (Catostomidae) on the federal endangered species list; the numbers of the two formerly abundant Upper Klamath Lake fish species had sharply fallen due to the decline in water quality. As a result, the government abandoned a planned dredging project, which would have further damaged the water quality. The project was to dredge a deeper navigation channel from one end of the lake to the other; it was planned between several government agencies and Aqua Farm's Inc.

A drought in the summer of 2001 heightened environmental concerns about the lake. The BOR stopped withdrawing irrigation water for the Klamath Project in order to protect the sucker population. The farming community protested, as they depended on a supply of lake waters for their operations. As of 2003, the FWS was monitoring the lake regularly due to water shortfalls, which endangered both fish in the lake and salmon in the Klamath River. The future uses of Klamath Lake are of national interest because of competing claims between farmers' property rights (supported by federal subsidies and programs) and larger environmental goals.

== See also ==
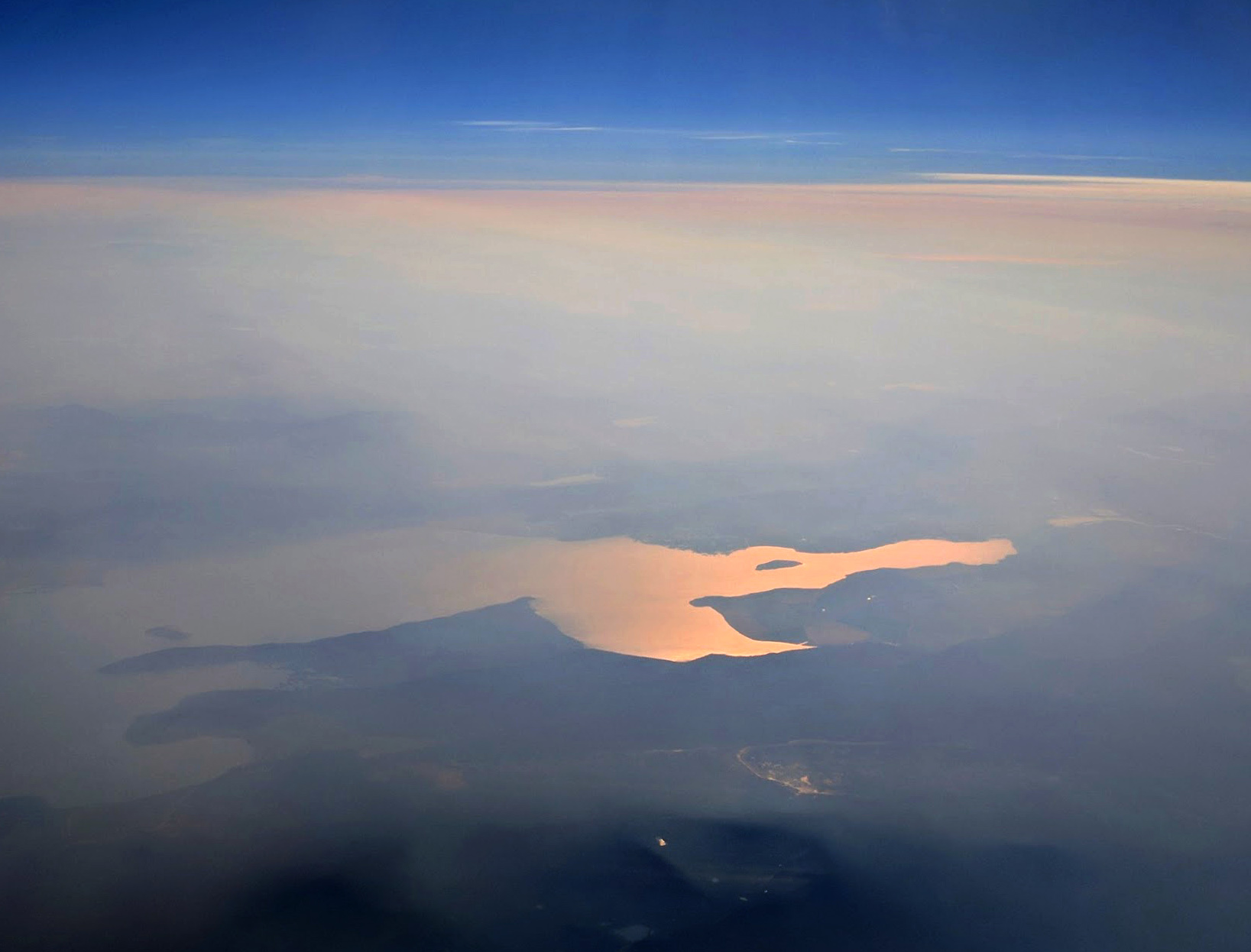
Upper Klamath Lake, reflecting the morning sun

- Eagle Ridge County Park
- Klamath County, Oregon
- List of lakes in Oregon
- Link River
- Link River Dam
