= Lost River (California) =

River in California and Oregon, United States

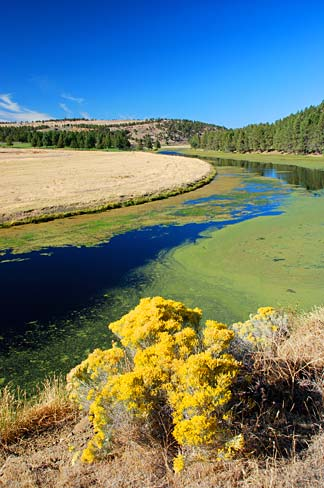
- Lost River near Bonanza, Oregon

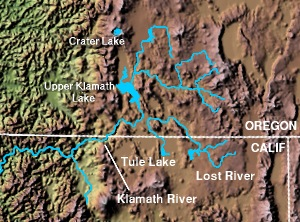
- Map showing the course of the Lost River and tributaries

- Location of the mouth of Lost River in California
- Etymology: Its lack of surface flow through part of the Langell Valley in Oregon

Location
- Country: United States
- State: California, Oregon
- County: Modoc, Klamath, Siskiyou

Physical characteristics
- Source: Clear Lake
  - location: Modoc County, California
  - coordinates: 41°55′34″N 121°04′33″W
  - elevation: 4,479 ft (1,365 m)
- Mouth: Tule Lake
  - location: Siskiyou County, California
  - coordinates: 41°56′24″N 121°30′19″W
  - elevation: 4,035 ft (1,230 m)
- Length: 60 mi (97 km)
- Basin size: 3,010 sq mi (7,800 km^{2})

The Lost River begins and ends in a closed basin in northern California and southern Oregon in the United States. The river, 60 miles (97 km) long, flows in an arc from Clear Lake Reservoir in Modoc County, California, through Klamath County, Oregon, to Tule Lake in Siskiyou County, California. About 46 mi (74 km) of Lost River are in Oregon, and 14 miles (23 km) are in California.

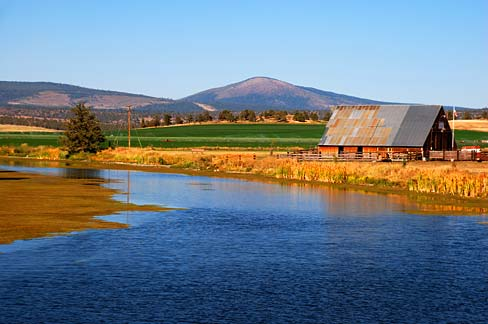
A barn near Lost River outside of Bonanza, Oregon

== Course ==
From its source, the river flows into Langell Valley, where Miller Creek enters from the right. Near Bonanza, the river turns west and passes through Olene Gap, about 10 mi (16 km) east of Klamath Falls. The river then turns southeast and flows along the base of Stukel Mountain, where it provides diversion canals for small lakes including Nuss Lake for irrigation and flood control. It then re-enters California south of Merrill.

Dams, canals, pumps, and other artificial structures on the Lost River, Clear Lake, and Tule Lake are part of the Klamath Project of the U.S. Bureau of Reclamation, which manages the basin's water flow mainly for farming and flood control. The project provides water to about 210,000 acres (85,000 ha) of cropland, 62% of which are in Oregon and 38% in California. Water from the Lost River basin is diverted to the Klamath River basin, mainly through the Lost River Diversion Channel, about 4 mi (6.4 km) downstream of Olene. The 8 mi (13 km) channel can also supply water by reverse flow from the Klamath when irrigation water is needed for farms in drained parts of Tule Lake.

== History ==
After 1846, the Applegate Trail crossed the river on a natural bridge of stepping-stones, later covered by a Bureau of Reclamation dam, near Merrill. Earlier in that year, explorer John C. Frémont had named the stream McCrady River after a boyhood friend, but over time the Lost River name prevailed. A Lost River post office operated briefly, probably in the vicinity of Olene, in 1875–76.

== Fishing ==
A sluggish stream, Lost River offers fishing opportunities for bass, up to 7 lb (3.2 kg), brown bullhead, crappie, yellow perch, and Sacramento perch. Trout are uncommon in this river.

== See also ==
- Battle of Lost River
- List of longest streams of Oregon
- List of rivers of California
- List of rivers of Oregon
