= Lower Klamath Lake =

Lake in Siskiyou County, California, United States

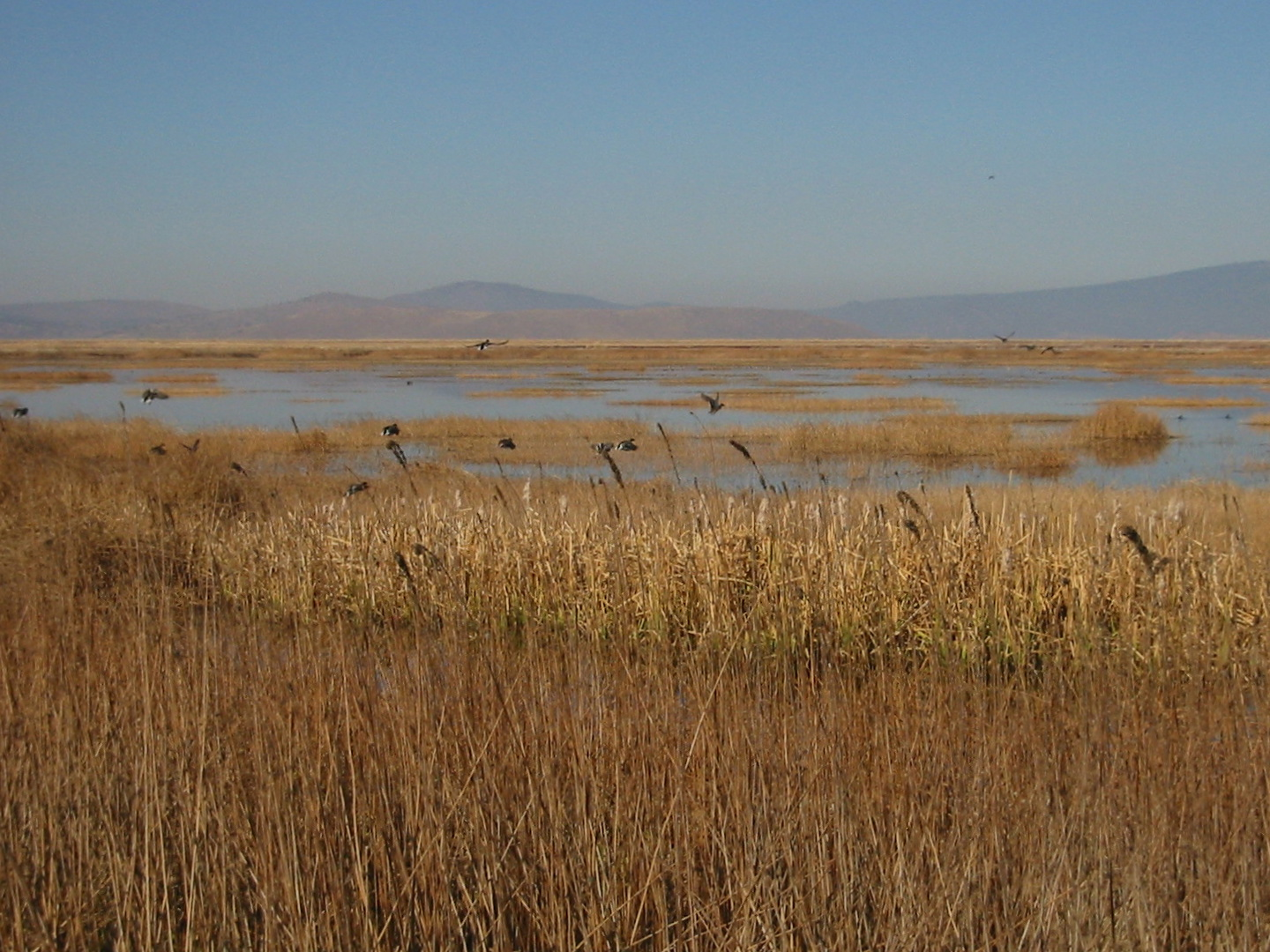
- Freshwater marsh on Lower Klamath Lake

- Location within California Location within the United States
- Location: Siskiyou County, California
- Coordinates: 41°59′27″N 121°44′35″W
- Basin countries: United States

Lower Klamath Lake is a lake in Siskiyou County, California, United States.

== Description ==
The lake is in Northern California, near the border with Oregon. The Lower Klamath National Wildlife Refuge (est. 1908), which covers the northern part of the lake, extends from California into Oregon.

At one time it was connected to Upper Klamath Lake. It currently is used to hold overflow water for Klamath Project irrigation uses.

The area around the lake was in the homeland of the indigenous Modoc people, prior to mid−19th century Anglo−American immigration.

== See also ==
- List of lakes in California
