= Langell Valley, Oregon =

Unincorporated community in the state of Oregon, United States

- Unincorporated community
- Location within Oregon Location within the United States
- Coordinates: 42°00′35″N 121°13′44″W
- Country: United States
- State: Oregon
- County: Klamath
- Elevation: 4,157 ft (1,267 m)
- Time zone: UTC-8 (Pacific (PST))
  - Summer (DST): UTC-7 (PDT)
- ZIP code: 97623
- Area codes: 458 and 541
- GNIS feature ID: 1136461

Langell Valley, previously known as Langell's Valley, is an unincorporated community in Klamath County, Oregon, United States.

== History ==
The community (and the valley) were named after settler Arthur Langell. Its post office operated in many locations from December 11, 1871, to March 15, 1930. Langell Valley is now served by the Bonanza post office.
