= Tule Lake National Wildlife Refuge =

Wildlife refuge in northern California, United States

- IUCN category IV (habitat/species management area)
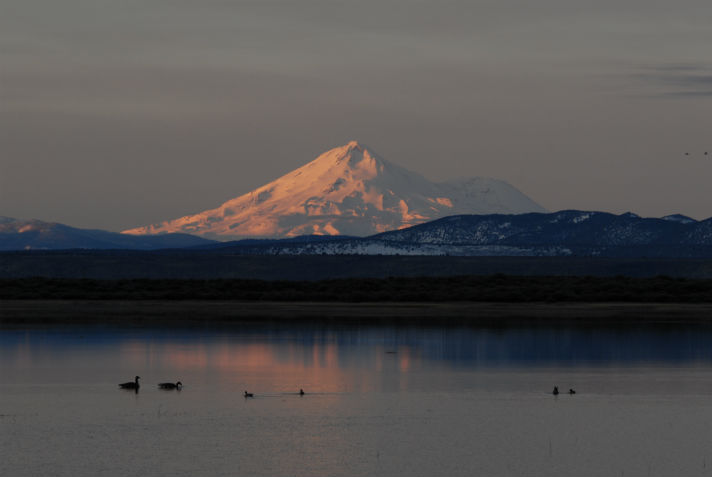
- Mount Shasta

- Location within the United States
- Location: Modoc County and Siskiyou County, California, United States
- Nearest city: Klamath Falls, Oregon
- Coordinates: 41°56′48″N 121°33′54″W
- Area: 39,116 acres (158.30 km^{2})
- Established: 1928
- Governing body: United States Fish and Wildlife Service
- Website: Tule Lake NWR

The Tule Lake National Wildlife Refuge is a National Wildlife Refuge of the United States in northern California near the Oregon border. It covers 39,116 acres (15,830 ha) in the Tule Lake basin. It is part of the Klamath Basin National Wildlife Refuge Complex, and is a crucial part of the Pacific Flyway corridor for migratory birds.

The refuge was established in 1928 by President Calvin Coolidge to preserve habitat for birds and other animals. It is a staging area for migrating waterfowl such as the greater white-fronted goose, snow goose, Ross's goose, and cackling goose. The refuge's waterways are inhabited by endangered fish species such as the Lost River sucker and shortnose sucker.

Local habitat types include uplands vegetated with grasses and shrubs such as sagebrush, and wetlands such as marshes. The refuge also includes about 19,000 acres (7,700 ha) of cropland leased to growers. Crops include potato, onion, horseradish, alfalfa, and cereals.

Recreation opportunities and public services include wildlife viewing and photography, education, and hunting.

== Gallery ==
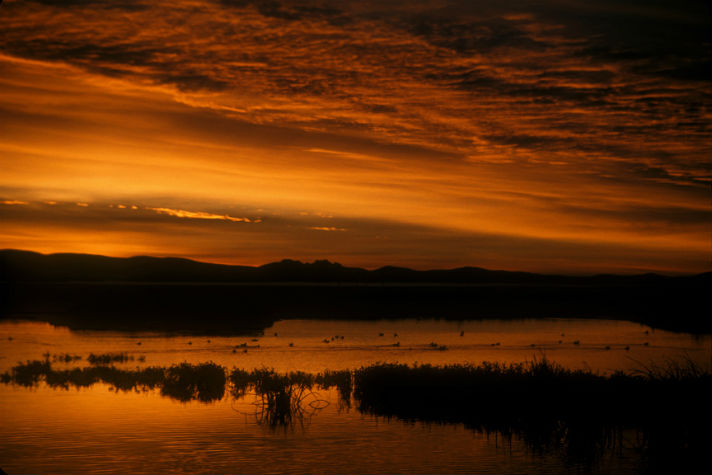
Sunrise on Discovery Marsh

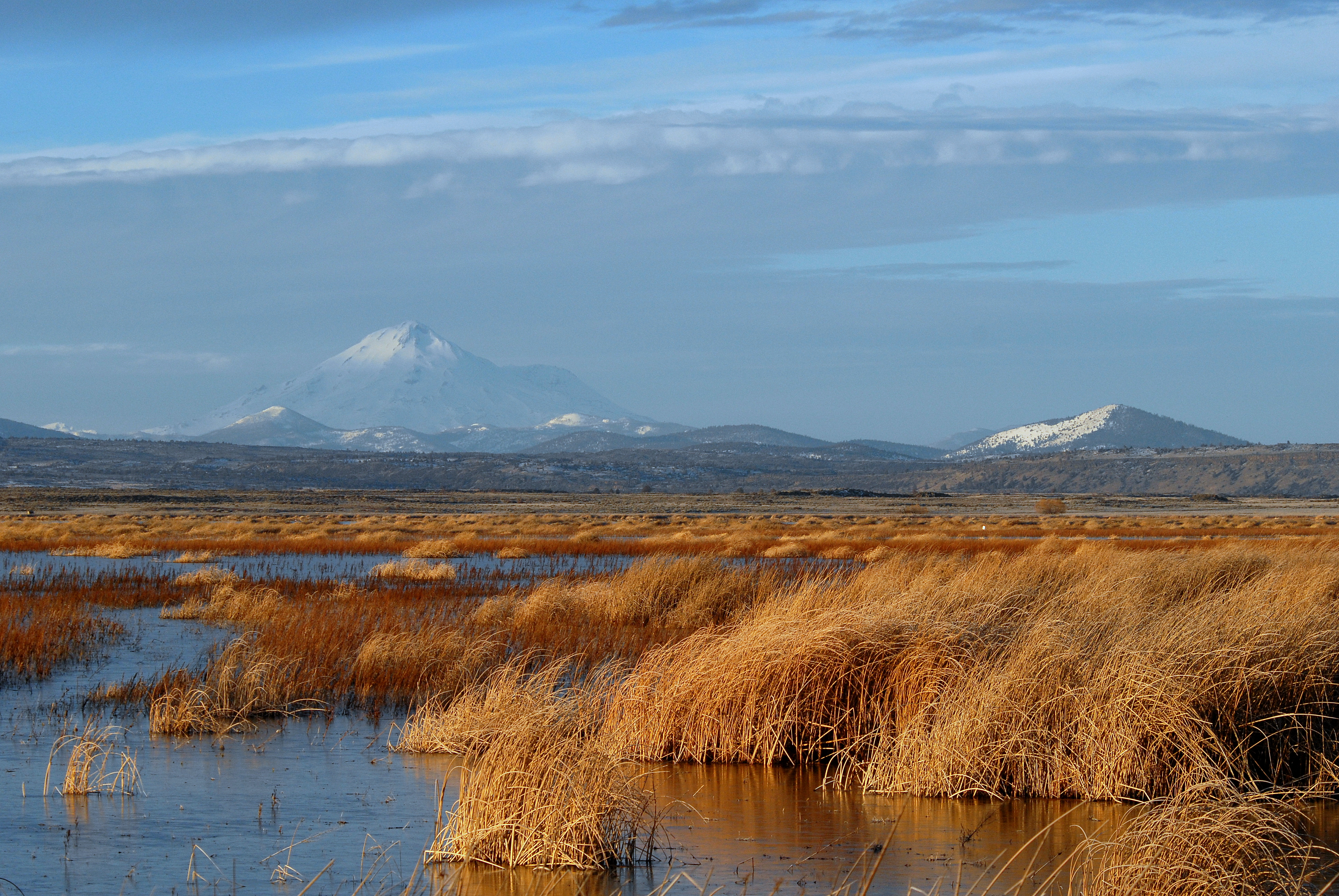
Tule Lake lower marsh

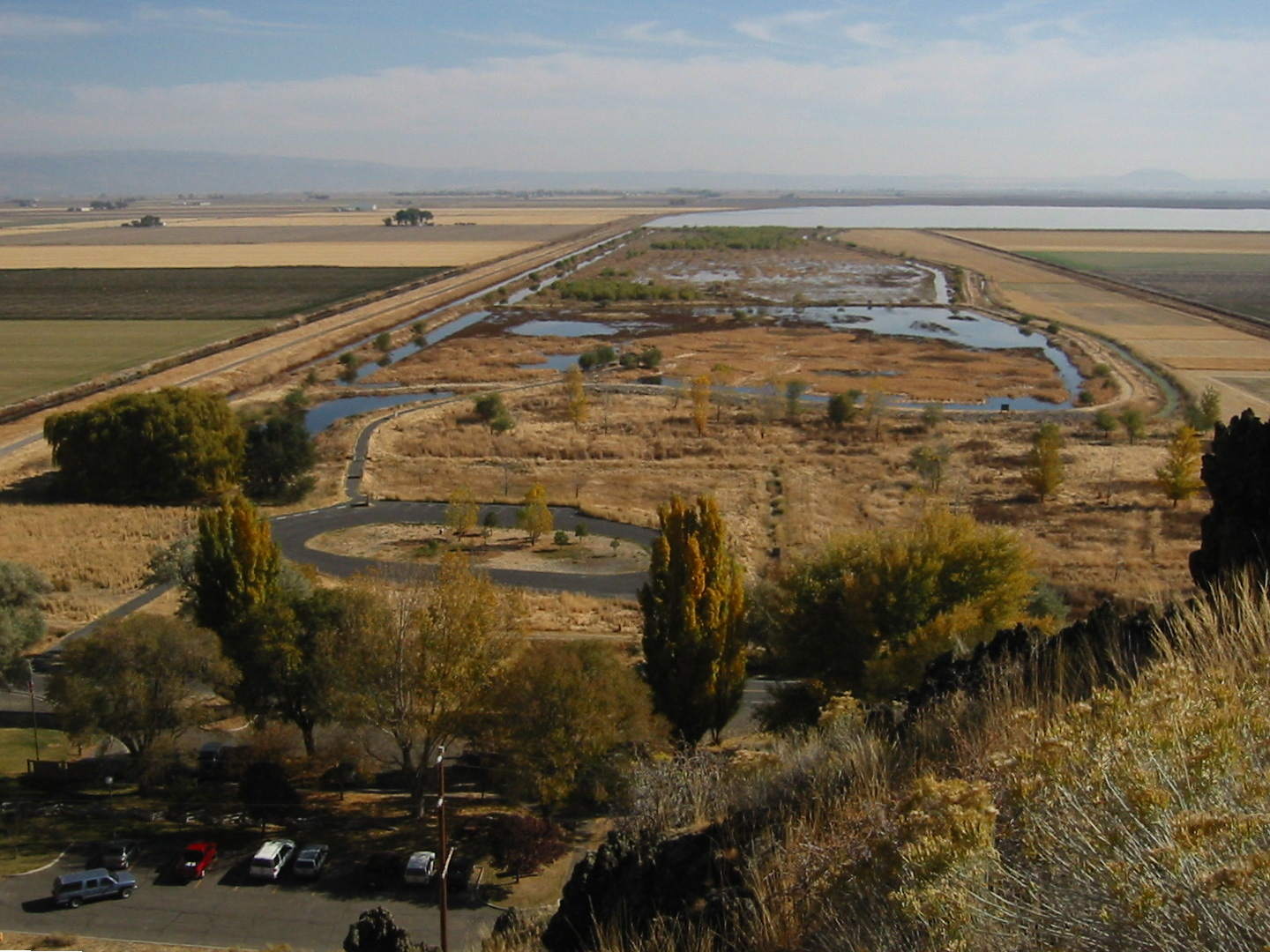
Visitors' Center

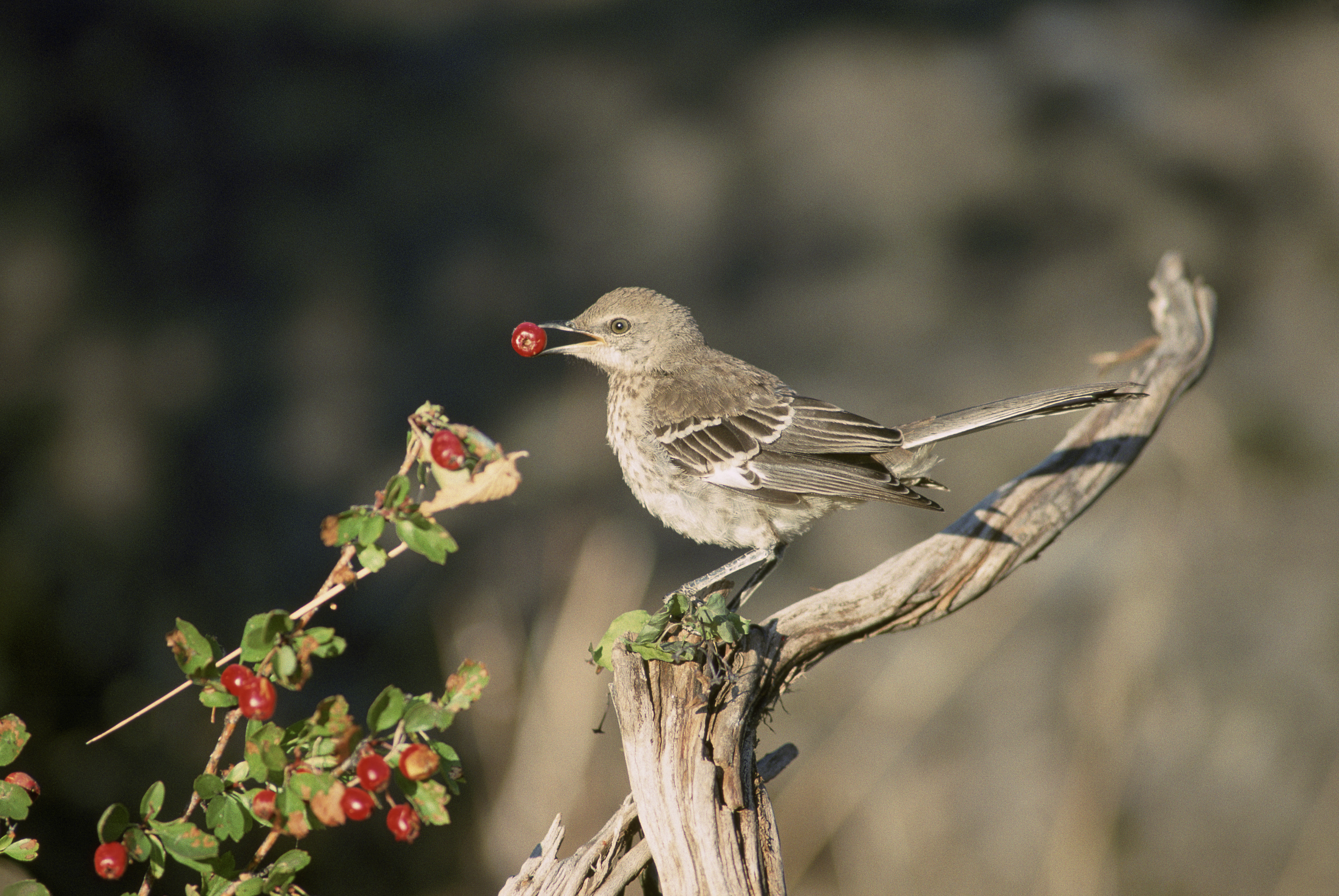
Sage thrasher on the refuge

== See also ==
- List of National Wildlife Refuges
- Volcanic Legacy Scenic Byway
