= Notchko, California =

Locality in Humboldt County, California, U.S.

Coordinates: 41°17′46″N 123°52′11″W

Notchko (Yurok: Nohchkueh) is a locality in Humboldt County, California, United States. It is located on the Klamath River, 4 miles (6.4 km) south of Johnsons, at an elevation of 151 feet (46 m). It is located on the Yurok Indian Reservation and was a significant Yurok burial site for generations; like many locales in the area, it was heavily damaged in the Christmas flood of 1964, with the remaining residents being offered sub-standard replacement housing without utilities.
