= Surgone, California =

Coordinates: 41°20′05″N 123°51′16″W

Surgone (Yurok: Sregon) is a locality in Humboldt County, California. It is located on the Klamath River 1.5 miles (2 km) southeast of Johnsons, at an elevation of 171 feet (52 m).
