= Loolego, California =

Human settlement in United States of America

Coordinates: 41.1960°N 123.6674°W

Loolego (possibly Yurok: Loogenohl) is a former Yurok settlement in Humboldt County, California, United States. It was located on the Lower Klamath River 2 mi (3.2 km) above the fork with the Trinity River. T. T. Waterman noted that the name, Lo'-o-le'-go, translates to "where they build a fish weir." It was about 2 miles upstream of the confluence of the Klamath and Trinity rivers and must at one time have been a substantial settlement because the inhabitants were public performers at the deerskin ceremony at wē-itspūs. 30 years before his 1909 visit, there had been two house pits and a sweat lodge foundation, but hydraulic placer mining had washed away the soil down to bedrock in the 1880s. Sherburne F. Cook wrote that the population of Loolego declined rapidly after white settlement.
