= Mettah, California =

Coordinates: 41°18′36″N 123°52′19″W

Mettah (Yurok: Metah) is a former settlement in Humboldt County, California, United States. It was located 10 miles (16 km) east of Orick and 3 miles (4.8 km) south of Johnsons, at an elevation of 207 feet (63 m).

The region of Metta was settled by Yurok since approximately the 14th century. During the gold rush of 1850, the Yurok were faced with disease and massacres by white settlers. Mettah was established as a post during the summer of 1872 to preserve the peace between the settlers and Indians in the area. The post was located at the Metta Indian village situated below the juncture of Mettah Creek and the Klamath River in Humboldt County. A post office operated at Mettah from 1924 to 1925.
