= California State Route 169 =

Highway in California

State Route 169
- SR 169 highlighted in red

Route information
- Maintained by Caltrans
- Length: 23.867 mi (38.410 km) SR 169 is broken into pieces due to an unconstructed portion, and the length does not reflect the gap.
- Existed: 1919–present

Section 1
- West end: US 101 at Klamath
- East end: Klamath Glen

Section 2
- West end: Wautec Village
- East end: SR 96 at Weitchpec

Location
- Country: United States
- State: California
- Counties: Del Norte, Humboldt

Highway system
- State highways in California; Interstate; US; State; Scenic; History; Pre‑1964; Unconstructed; Deleted; Freeways
← SR 168	→ SR 170

State Route 169 (SR 169) is a state highway in the U.S. state of California that is separated into two distinct segments by undeveloped areas in the Yurok Indian Reservation in Del Norte and Humboldt counties. The western segment runs from U.S. Route 101 near Klamath to Klamath Glen, while the eastern segment goes from Wautec Village to State Route 96 near Weitchpec.

== Route description ==
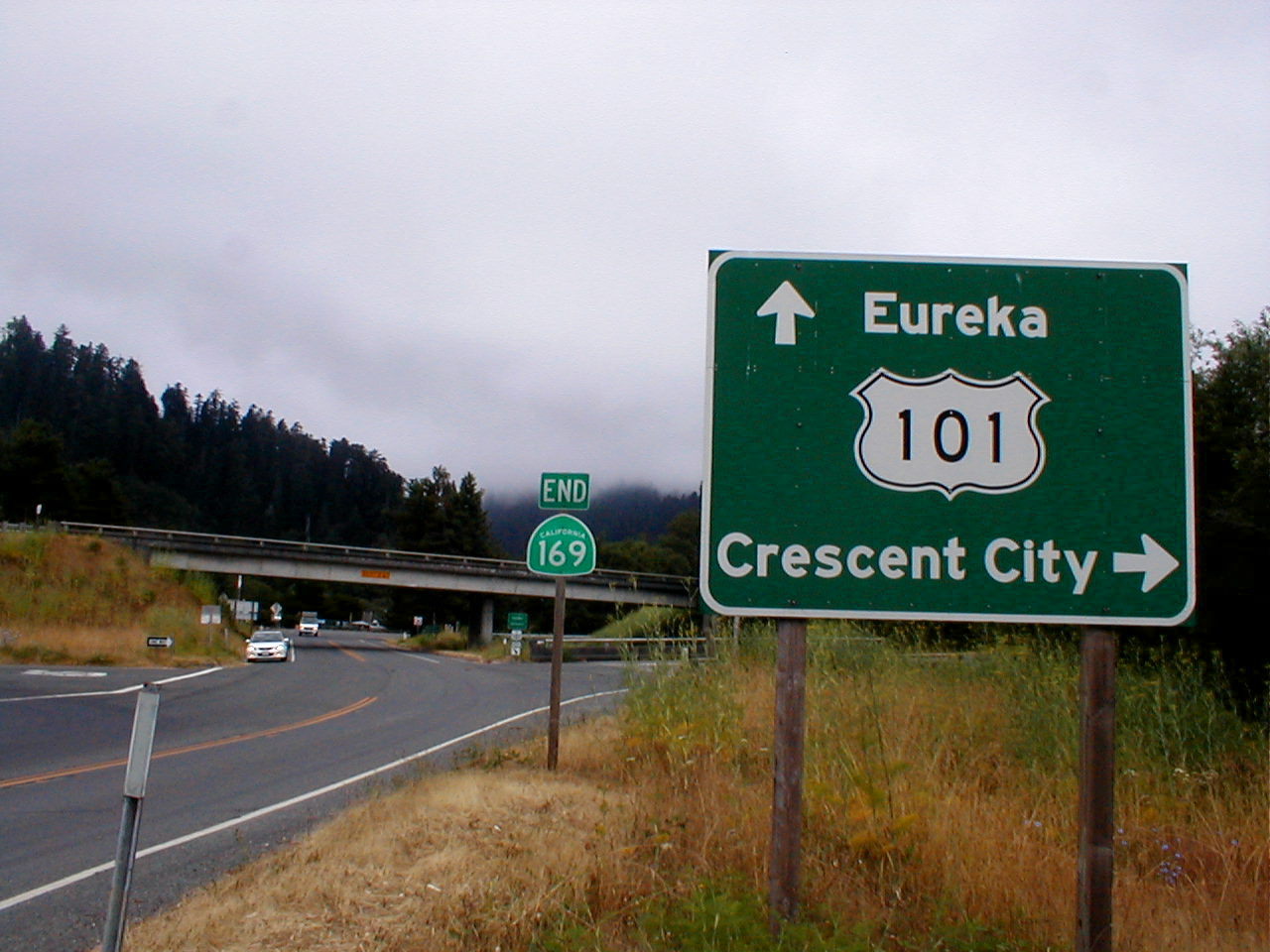
Western terminus of SR 169 at US 101

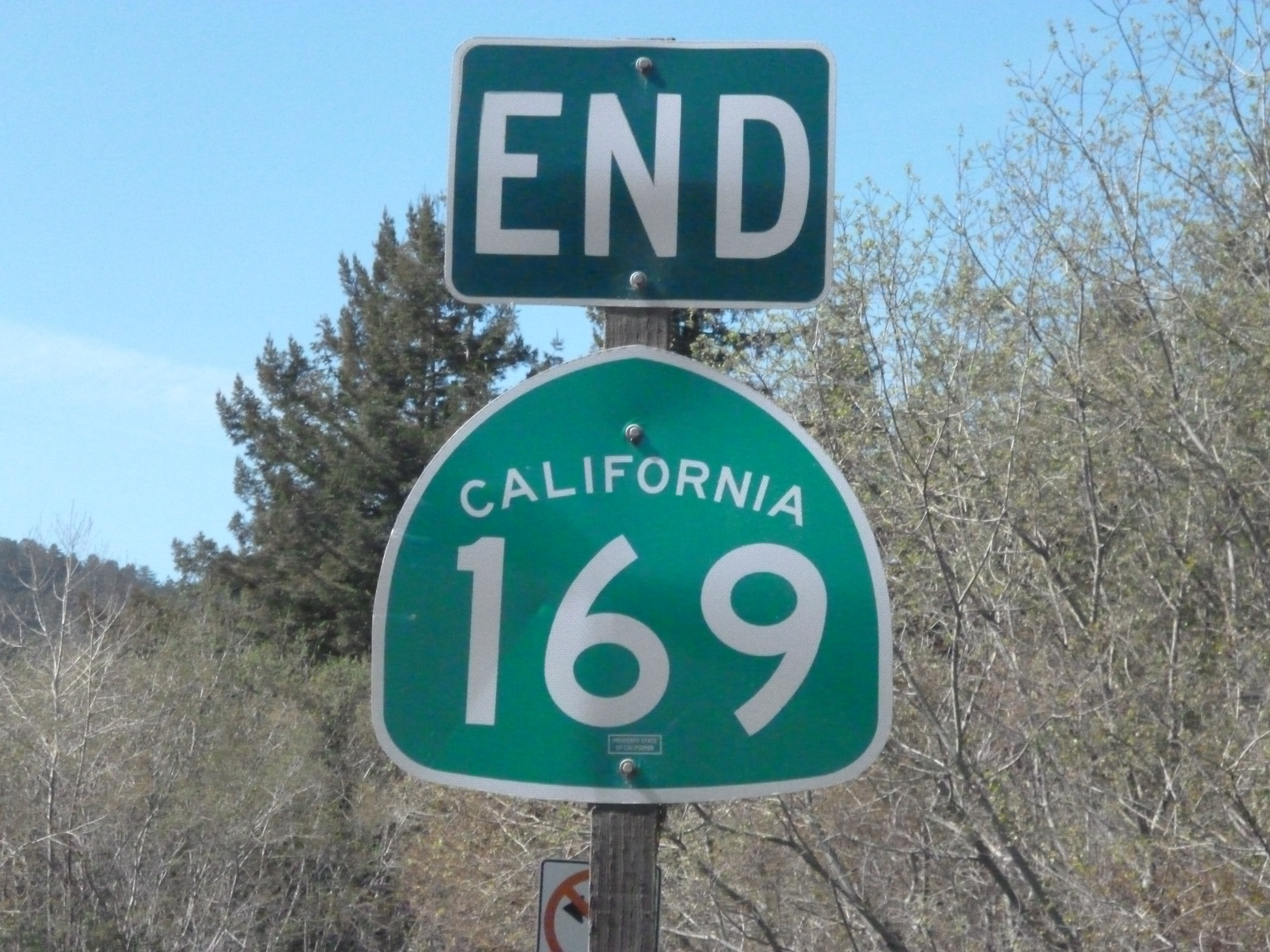
Marker at the end of SR 169

Route 169 is defined in section 469 of the California Streets and Highways Code, and that the highway is "from Route 101 near Klamath to Route 96 near Weitchpec". The definition also states that Caltrans "may maintain a traversable highway located in portions of the area between the termini of and approximately on this route even though the highway is not continuous".

State Route 169 begins at U.S. Route 101 near Klamath and after a discontinuity from Klamath Glen (near the McBeth Airport) to Johnsons via the Yurok Indian Reservation, resumes at the town of Wautec. The highway continues through Pecwan before the curving road heads southeast and passes through Martins Ferry after several miles. SR 169 ends at State Route 96 near Weitchpec. The entire route is within the Yurok Indian Reservation.

SR 169 is not part of the National Highway System, a network of highways that are considered essential to the country's economy, defense, and mobility by the Federal Highway Administration.

== Major intersections ==
Except where prefixed with a letter, postmiles were measured on the road as it was in 1964, based on the alignment that existed at the time, and do not necessarily reflect current mileage. Postmile prefixes include: R reflecting a realignment in the route since then, M indicating a second realignment, L referring to an overlap due to a correction or change, and T indicating postmiles classified as temporary. Segments that remain unconstructed or have been relinquished to local control may be omitted. The numbers reset at county lines; the start and end postmiles in each county are given in the county column.

County	Location	Postmile	Destinations	Notes
Del Norte; DN R0.00-3.52	Klamath	R0.00	US 101 – Eureka, Crescent City	Interchange; west end of SR 169; US 101 exit 769; road continues as Chapman Street
Del Norte; DN R0.00-3.52	Klamath Glen	3.52	Riffle Road	East end of western section of SR 169
Gap in route
Humboldt; HUM 13.20-33.84	Wautec	13.20	Johnsons Road	West end of eastern section of SR 169
Humboldt; HUM 13.20-33.84		29.95	Martins Ferry Bridge over Martins Ferry School Creek	
Humboldt; HUM 13.20-33.84	Weitchpec	33.84	SR 96	East end of SR 169
1.000 mi = 1.609 km; 1.000 km = 0.621 mi
