= Pekwuteu, California =

Pekwuteu Pekwtuehl (Yurok)
- Former settlement
- Location in California
- Coordinates: 41°11′04″N 123°42′09″W
- Country: United States
- State: California
- County: Humboldt
- Elevation: 348 ft (106 m)

Pekwuteu (Yurok: Pekwtuehl) is a former Yurok settlement in Humboldt County, California, United States. It was located on the Lower Klamath River opposite town of Weitchpec, at an elevation of 348 feet (106 m).
