= Wautec, California =

Wautec Wohtekw (Yurok)
- Census-designated place
- Location within California Location within the United States
- Coordinates: 41°21′2″N 123°52′23″W
- Country: United States
- State: California
- County: Humboldt

Area
  - Total: 2.31 sq mi (5.97 km^{2})
  - Land: 2.31 sq mi (5.97 km^{2})
  - Water: 0 sq mi (0 km^{2}) 0%
- Elevation: 160 ft (49 m)

Population (2020)
  - Total: 48
  - Density: 21/sq mi (8.0/km^{2})
- Time zone: UTC-8 (Pacific (PST))
  - Summer (DST): UTC-7 (PDT)
- ZIP Code: 95546 (Hoopa)
- Area code: 707
- FIPS code: 06-83730
- GNIS feature ID: 2805900

Wautec (Yurok: Wohtekw) is an unincorporated community and census-designated place (CDP) in Humboldt County, California, United States. It is located within the Yurok Indian Reservation, in the valley of the Klamath River, 20 miles (32 km) northeast (downstream) of Weitchpec.

As of the 2020 census, Wautec had a population of 48.

== Demographics ==
Historical population
| Census | Pop. | Note | %± |
|---|---|---|---|
| 2020 | 48 | | — |
U.S. Decennial Census; 1850–1870 1880-1890; 1900 1910 1920; 1930 1940 1950; 1960 1970 1980; 1990 2000 2010; 2020

Wautec first appeared as a census designated place in the 2020 U.S. census.

=== 2020 Census ===
Wautec CDP, California – Racial and ethnic composition Note: the US Census treats Hispanic/Latino as an ethnic category. This table excludes Latinos from the racial categories and assigns them to a separate category. Hispanics/Latinos may be of any race.
| Race / Ethnicity (NH = Non-Hispanic) | Pop 2020 | % 2020 |
|---|---|---|
| White alone (NH) | 15 | 31.25% |
| Black or African American alone (NH) | 0 | 0.00% |
| Native American or Alaska Native alone (NH) | 30 | 62.50% |
| Asian alone (NH) | 0 | 0.00% |
| Pacific Islander alone (NH) | 0 | 0.00% |
| Other race alone (NH) | 1 | 2.08% |
| Mixed race or Multiracial (NH) | 1 | 2.08% |
| Hispanic or Latino (any race) | 1 | 2.08% |
| Total | 48 | 100.00% |
