= Jenny Creek =

Coordinates: 41°58′37″N 122°23′56″W

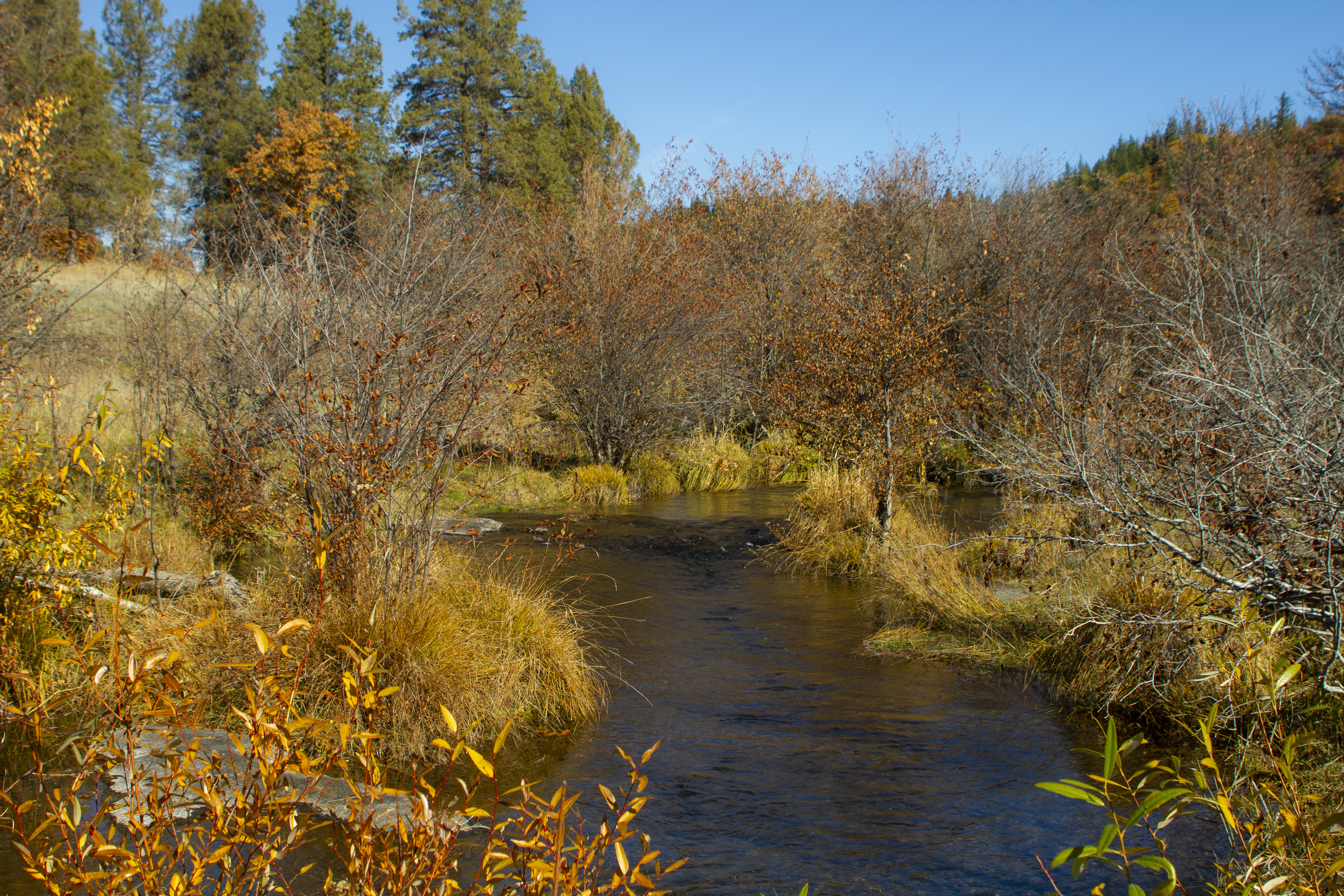
- Jenny Creek in October 2019

National Wild and Scenic Rivers System
- Type: Scenic
- Designated: March 12, 2019

Jenny Creek is a stream in the U.S. states of California and Oregon. It empties into the Klamath River, where it was formerly Iron Gate Reservoir.

Jenny Creek received its name in the 1850s when a jenny mule drowned in its waters.
