= California State Route 96 =

Highway in California

State Route 96
- SR 96 highlighted in red

Route information
- Maintained by Caltrans
- Length: 146.519 mi (235.799 km)
- Tourist routes: Bigfoot Scenic Byway

Major junctions
- West end: SR 299 at Willow Creek
- East end: I-5 near Yreka

Location
- Country: United States
- State: California
- Counties: Humboldt, Siskiyou

Highway system
- State highways in California; Interstate; US; State; Scenic; History; Pre‑1964; Unconstructed; Deleted; Freeways
← US 95	→ US 97

State Route 96 (SR 96) is a state highway in the U.S. state of California that follows the Trinity and Klamath Rivers between State Route 299 in Willow Creek and Interstate 5 near Yreka in Northern California. For most of the route it goes through the Karuk Tribal Reservation, the Yurok Tribal Reservation, and the Hoopa Tribal Reservation. Over half of the length is the Bigfoot Scenic Byway, passing through "the region boasting the most sightings of Bigfoot of anywhere in the country" according to the National Forest Scenic Byway Program.

== Route description ==
Route 96 is defined in section 396 of the California Streets and Highways Code, and that the highway is "from Route 299 near Willow Creek via the vicinity of Weitchpec to Route 5 near the confluence of the Shasta and Klamath Rivers."

SR 96 begins at a junction with State Route 299, the Trinity Highway, in Willow Creek. It heads north, following the Trinity River downstream through Hoopa, and exiting the Trinity National Forest near its confluence with the Klamath River at Weitchpec. At Weitchpec, the route intersects State Route 169 and turns northeast into the Six Rivers National Forest. The highway passes through Orleans and turns more northerly after intersecting Salmon River Road. Passing through Happy Camp, SR 96 enters the Klamath National Forest. After passing through Gottsville, the route exits the national forest. It intersects State Route 263, which heads south toward Yreka. SR 96 then turns north. Passing the Randolf Collier Safety Roadside Rest Area, the route meets its terminus at Interstate 5.

SR 96 is not part of the National Highway System, a network of highways that are considered essential to the country's economy, defense, and mobility by the Federal Highway Administration. SR 96 is eligible for the State Scenic Highway System, but it is not officially designated as a scenic highway by the California Department of Transportation.

The segment of SR 96 from Willow Creek to Happy Camp is designated as the Bigfoot Scenic Byway, a National Forest Scenic Byway that goes through a region boasting the most sightings of Bigfoot in the United States.

== Major intersections ==
Except where prefixed with a letter, postmiles were measured on the road as it was in 1964, based on the alignment that existed at the time, and do not necessarily reflect current mileage. Postmile prefixes include: R reflecting a realignment in the route since then, M indicating a second realignment, L referring to an overlap due to a correction or change, and T indicating postmiles classified as temporary. Segments that remain unconstructed or have been relinquished to local control may be omitted. The numbers reset at county lines; the start and end postmiles in each county are given in the county column.

County	Location	Postmile	Destinations	Notes
Humboldt; HUM 0.00-R44.98	Willow Creek	0.00	SR 299 – Redding, Eureka	West end of SR 96
Humboldt; HUM 0.00-R44.98	Weitchpec	23.09	SR 169 (Bald Hills Road) – Martins Ferry	
Siskiyou; SIS R0.00-105.82	Happy Camp	41.10	Main Street	
Siskiyou; SIS R0.00-105.82		71.33	Scott River Road – Scott Bar, Fort Jones	
Siskiyou; SIS R0.00-105.82		103.41	SR 263 – Yreka	
Siskiyou; SIS R0.00-105.82		105.82	I-5 – Portland, Redding, Randolf Collier Rest Area	Interchange; east end of SR 96; I-5 exit 786
1.000 mi = 1.609 km; 1.000 km = 0.621 mi
