= Klamath Glen, California =

Unincorporated community in California, United States

Klamath Glen Terwerr (Yurok)
- Unincorporated community
- Location in California
- Coordinates: 41°30′45″N 123°59′38″W
- Country: United States
- State: California
- County: Del Norte County
- Elevation: 46 ft (14 m)

Klamath Glen (possibly Yurok: Terwerr) is an unincorporated community in Del Norte County, California, United States. It is located on the Klamath River, 5 miles (8 km) from its mouth, at an elevation of 46 feet (14 m).

Located on the site of Fort Ter-Waw, Klamath Glen was once a resort community, but was largely destroyed in a 1953 flood. After further massive floods in 1955 and 1964, a levee was built to protect the town, completed in 1971. Today, Klamath Glen is an impoverished town on the Yurok Indian Reservation, but is a popular fishing destination; an expansion of Yurok fishing rights in 1978 led to violent conflicts with non-Native fishermen in the so-called Klamath Salmon Wars.
