= Johnsons, California =

Unincorporated community in California, United States

Johnsons Ch'eeegolew (Yurok)
- Unincorporated community
- Location in California Johnsons (the United States)
- Coordinates: 41°21′01″N 123°52′19″W
- Country: United States
- State: California
- County: Humboldt County
- Elevation: 180 ft (55 m)

Johnsons (possibly Yurok: Ch'eeegolew; formerly Klamath) is an unincorporated community in Humboldt County, California. It is located on the Klamath River 14 miles (23 km) northwest of Weitchpec, at an elevation of 180 feet (55 m).

== History ==
Johnsons is a settlement in Humboldt County. A fairly isolated and small Yurok ancestral village, Johnsons is located within the Yurok reservation along the Klamath River and is known for its excellent fishing and serenity. Electricity was made available to the community in 2019 after a long-standing utilization of solar and generator power.
