= Weitchpec, California =

Unincorporated community in California, United States

Weitchpec Wechpues, Wech (Yurok)
- Unincorporated community Census-designated place
- Location in California
- Coordinates: 41°11′17″N 123°42′30″W
- Country: United States
- State: California
- County: Humboldt

Area
  - Total: 3.886 sq mi (10.06 km^{2})
  - Land: 3.830 sq mi (9.92 km^{2})
  - Water: 0.056 sq mi (0.15 km^{2})
- Elevation: 1,398 ft (426 m)

Population (2020)
  - Total: 112
  - Density: 29.2/sq mi (11.3/km^{2})
- Zip code: 95546
- GNIS feature ID: 1660142

Weitchpec (/ˈwɛtʃpɛk/ WETCH-pek; Yurok: Wechpues, Wech; Karok: Ansáfriik) is an unincorporated village and CDP within the Yurok reservation in Humboldt County, California, United States. It is located 35 miles (56 km) northeast of Eureka, at an elevation of 361 feet (110 m). The ZIP Code is 95546. As of the 2020 census, Weitchpec had a population of 112.

Weitchpec is located in the northwestern part of the state at the confluence of the Klamath and Trinity Rivers, and the junction of State Highways 96 and 169.

== History ==
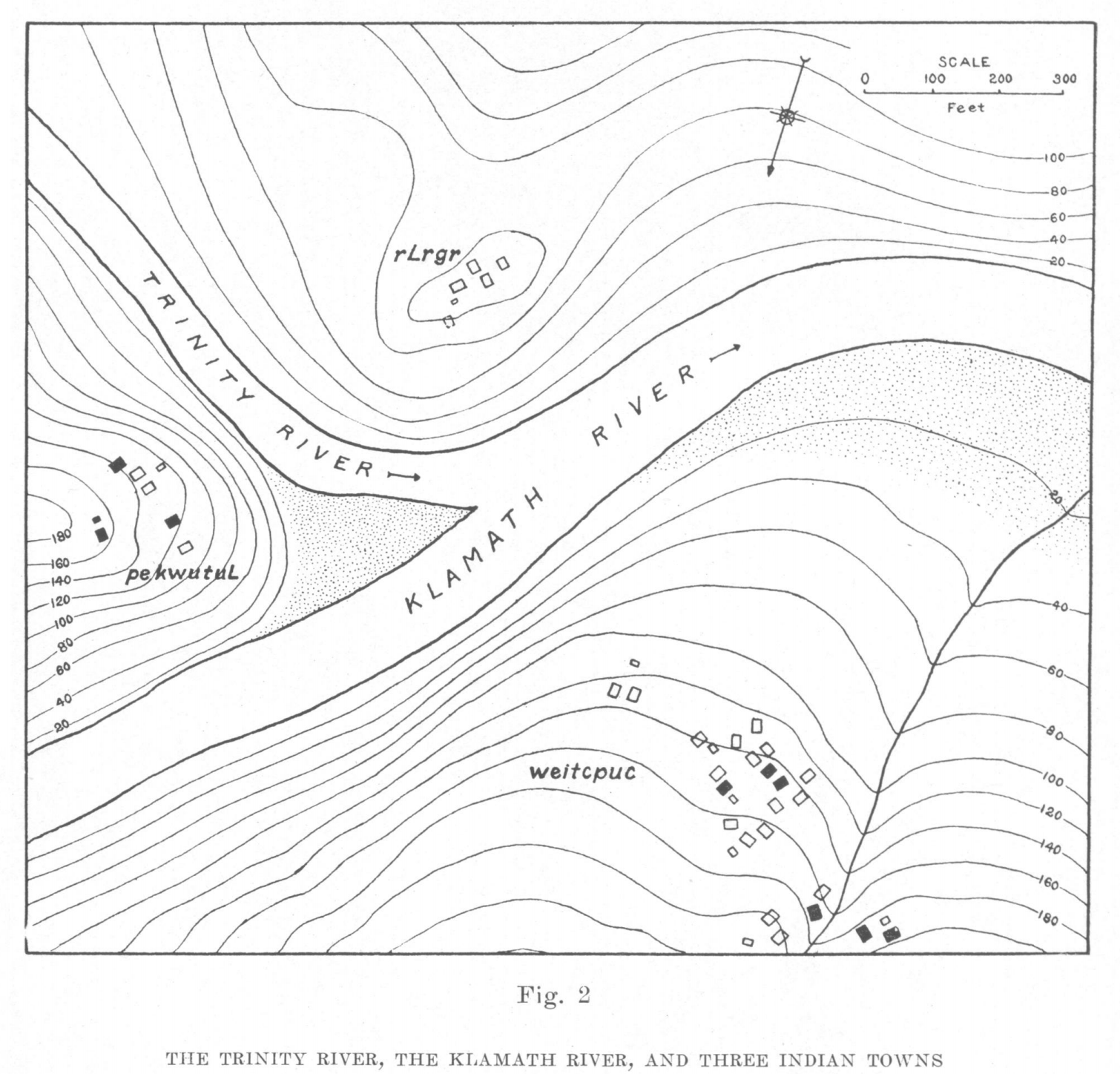
Map of historical Yurok villages at modern Weitchpec

Weitchpec is an ancestral Yurok village that long predates European contact. It was originally known as Weitspus, and was considered a major settlement of the Yurok people. Temporary Euro-American names for the settlement in the 19th century were Durkee's Ferry and Weitchpec Bar. Durkee's Ferry recalls Clark W. Durkee, who operated a ferry at the place in 1851. In 1855, a temporary Federal post called Camp Strowbridge was established at Weitchpec, it was later called Fort Wool. The settlement was first within the bounds of Trinity County, then in 1851 Klamath County and after 1874, Humboldt County. A post office operated at Weitchpec from 1858 to 1860 and from 1891 to 1962.

Today Weitchpec features a small store/gas station owned by the tribe (formerly Pierson's Grocery); the Yurok Tribal Office and Community Center; and Weitchpec Elementary School. As of 2010, evening classes were available in Weitchpec in the Yurok language.

=== 2012 earthquake ===
A 5.6 earthquake with an epicenter near Weitchpec occurred on February 13, 2012.

== Demographics ==
Historical population
Census	Pop.	Note	%±
2020	112		—
U.S. Decennial Census; 1850–1870 1880-1890; 1900 1910 1920; 1930 1940 1950; 1960 1970 1980; 1990 2000 2010; 2020

Weitchpec first appeared as a census designated place in the 2020 U.S. census.

=== 2020 Census ===
Weitchpec CDP, California – Racial and ethnic composition Note: the US Census treats Hispanic/Latino as an ethnic category. This table excludes Latinos from the racial categories and assigns them to a separate category. Hispanics/Latinos may be of any race.
Race / Ethnicity (NH = Non-Hispanic)	Pop 2020	% 2020
White alone (NH)	18	16.07%
Black or African American alone (NH)	1	0.89%
Native American or Alaska Native alone (NH)	71	63.39%
Asian alone (NH)	0	0.00%
Pacific Islander alone (NH)	0	0.00%
Other race alone (NH)	1	0.89%
Mixed race or Multiracial (NH)	19	16.96%
Hispanic or Latino (any race)	2	1.79%
Total	112	100.00%
