= Klamath River =

River in Oregon and California, United States

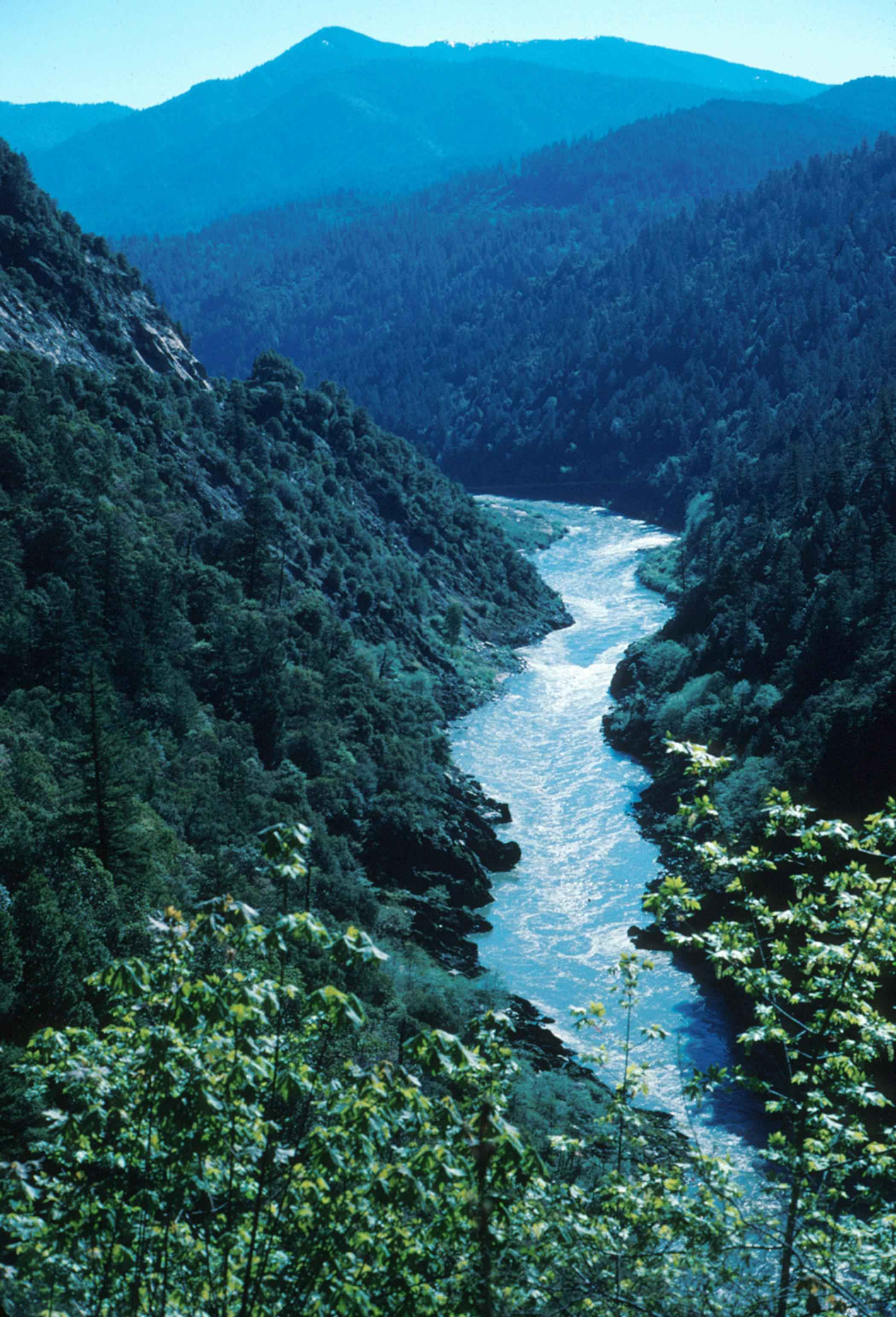
- The Klamath River in California

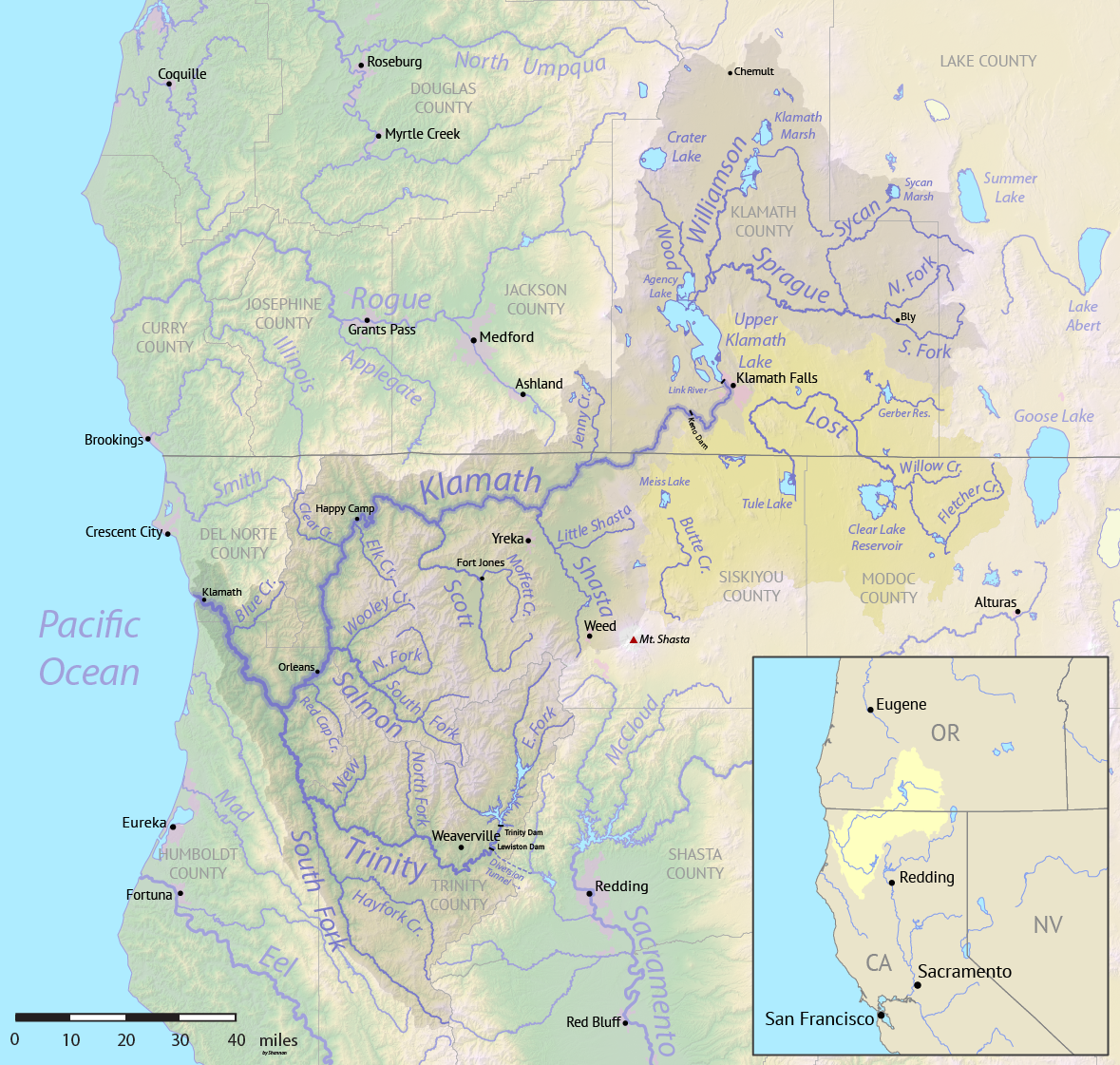
- Map of the Klamath River watershed. The artificially connected Lost River/Butte Creek basins are shown in yellow.
- Etymology: For the Klamath people, by early 19th-century fur trappers
- Native name: Ishkêesh (Karok); Koke (Klamath-Modoc); Hehlkeek ʼWe-Roy (Yurok)

Location
- Country: United States
- State: Oregon, California
- City: Klamath Falls

Physical characteristics
- Source: Lake Ewauna
  - location: Klamath Falls, Oregon
  - coordinates: 42°11′29″N 121°46′58″W
  - elevation: 4,088 ft (1,246 m)
- Mouth: Pacific Ocean
  - location: Requa, California
  - coordinates: 41°32′49″N 124°5′0″W
  - elevation: 0 ft (0 m)
- Length: 257 mi (414 km)
- Basin size: 15,500 mi^{2} (40,000 km^{2})
- Discharge
  - location: Klamath, CA, about 3.2 mi (5.1 km) from the mouth
  - average: 16,430 cu ft/s (465 m^{3}/s)
  - minimum: 1,310 cu ft/s (37 m^{3}/s)
  - maximum: 557,000 cu ft/s (15,800 m^{3}/s)

Basin features
- Tributaries
  - left: Shasta River, Scott River, Elk Creek, Salmon River, Trinity River
  - right: Jenny Creek, Clear Creek, Blue Creek

National Wild and Scenic River
- Type: Wild: 11.7 miles (18.8 km); Scenic: 34.5 miles (55.5 km); Recreational: 250.8 miles (403.6 km)
- Designated: January 19, 1981 (California); September 22, 1994 (Oregon)

The Klamath River (Karuk: Ishkêesh, Klamath: Koke, Yurok: Hehlkeek ʼWe-Roy) is a 257-mile (414 km) long river in southern Oregon and northern California. Beginning near Klamath Falls in the Oregon high desert, it flows west through the Cascade Range and Klamath Mountains before reaching the temperate rainforest of California's North Coast, where it empties into the Pacific Ocean. The Klamath River is the third-largest salmon and steelhead producing river on the west coast of the contiguous United States. The river's watershed – the Klamath Basin – encompasses more than 15,000 square miles (39,000 km^{2}), and is known for its biodiverse forests, large areas of designated wilderness, and freshwater marshes that provide key migratory bird habitat.

Native Americans have used the river as a source of food and trade for thousands of years, and it continues to hold great cultural significance for tribes. Most lands along the upper Klamath were settled by Euro-Americans following exploration by fur trappers in the early to mid-19th century. Violent conflict and displacement of tribes occurred during the California Gold Rush as prospectors pushed into the lower Klamath basin, leading to a bitter fight over establishing reservation lands. In the early 20th century, the federal government drained the upper basin's once extensive lakes and wetlands for agriculture, while private utilities constructed hydroelectric dams along the river. As salmon runs declined in the mid-20th century, tribes pushed for legal recognition of their senior water rights to support Klamath River fisheries, which have led to controversial reductions in irrigation water supply.

In the 21st century, the Klamath River hosts a wide variety of uses, including tribal subsistence fishing and ceremonies, recreational fishing and whitewater boating, and agricultural and domestic water supply. Starting in 1981, much of the Klamath River and its tributaries have been designated National Wild and Scenic Rivers. Four hydroelectric dams on the Klamath River were demolished by October 2024, following almost two decades of negotiations between local representatives, tribes, conservation groups and the utility company operating the dams. This enabled salmon migration to the Upper Klamath Basin for the first time in over 100 years, and established new guidelines for Klamath water use to achieve a compromise between agricultural needs and fishery flows.

== Course ==
The official beginning of the Klamath River is at Lake Ewauna, a small natural lake near Klamath Falls, Oregon. The primary inflow of Lake Ewauna is the short Link River, which connects it to Upper Klamath Lake. Upper Klamath, in turn, is fed by the Williamson River (originating in the Winema National Forest) and Wood River (originating in Crater Lake National Park). For the first 18 miles (29 km) below Lake Ewauna, the Klamath River takes a slow meandering course through what was formerly the Klamath Marshes, which were drained for agriculture in the early 20th century. An artificial channel diverts water from the Lost River, which normally flows into Tule Lake, into the Klamath during periods of high runoff.

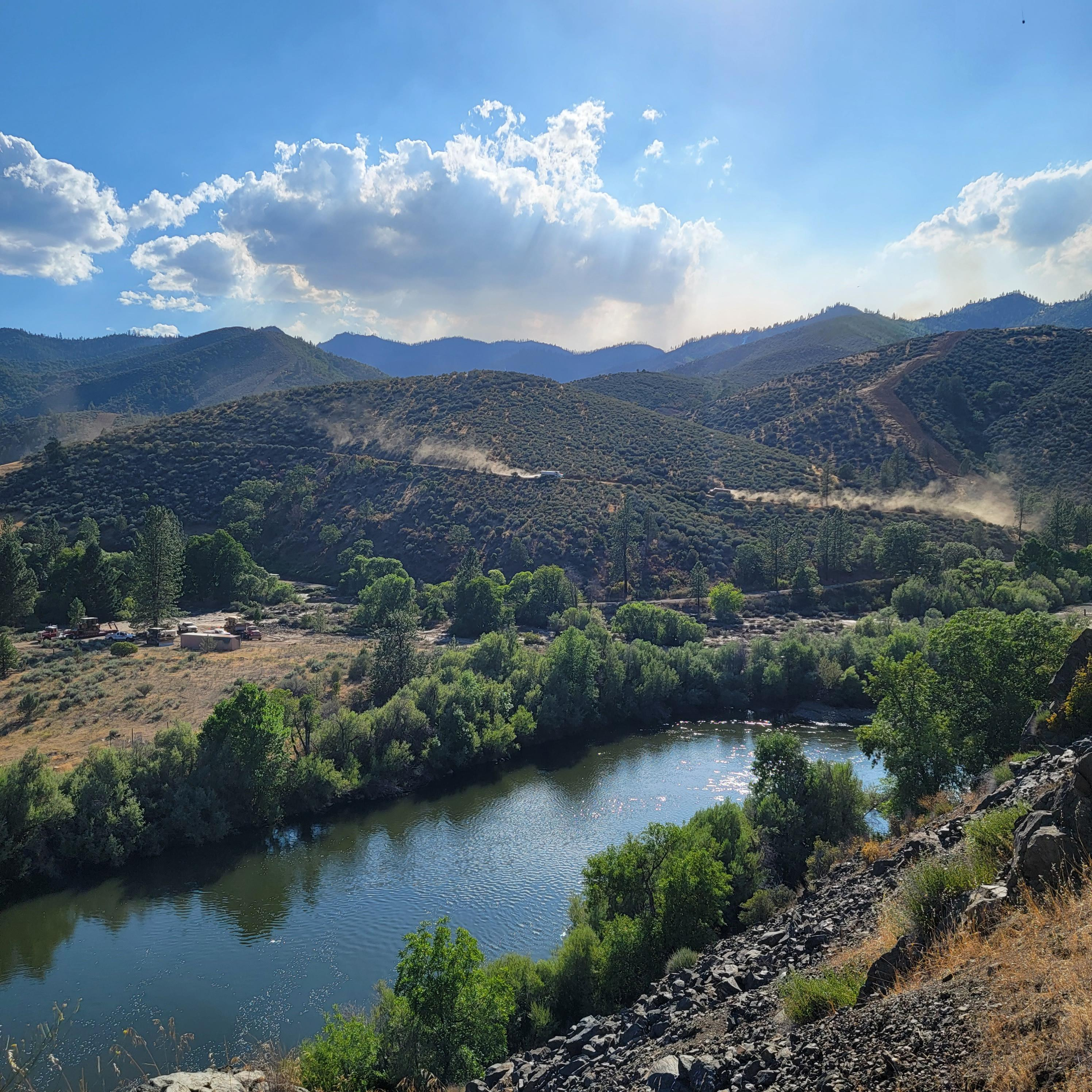
The Klamath River in Siskiyou County, California

Below Keno Dam (which controls the level of the upstream Klamath River and Lake Ewauna), the river flows swiftly through the narrow Klamath River Canyon, which cuts through volcanic rock of the southern Cascade Range. Entering Siskiyou County, California, it passes the former sites of four hydroelectric dams operated by PacifiCorp until their demolition in 2024. After passing under Interstate 5, the Klamath receives the Shasta River from the left then flows west into the Siskiyou Mountains (a sub-range of the Klamath Mountains), entering the Klamath National Forest. It receives the Scott River from the left, passing through Seiad Valley and Happy Camp. Turning south, it flows towards Somes Bar, where it receives the Salmon River from the left as it enters Humboldt County and the Six Rivers National Forest. After passing Orleans, the Klamath reaches Weitchpec, where it receives the Trinity River, its largest tributary, from the left. State Route 96 follows the Klamath River for 137 miles (220 km) from Hornbrook to Weitchpec.

Downstream of the Trinity River, the Klamath turns sharply northwest. The entire 44-mile (71 km) lower section of the river flows through coast redwood forests in the Yurok Indian Reservation. State Route 169 follows most of this section of the river, except for an unconstructed segment between river miles 8–23 (13–37 km) which is only accessible by boat. The river enters Del Norte County, where Highway 101 bridges it at the town of Klamath. The river empties into the Pacific Ocean at a tidal estuary near Requa, in an area shared by the Yurok Reservation and Redwood National and State Parks, about 16 miles (26 km) south of Crescent City.

== Watershed ==
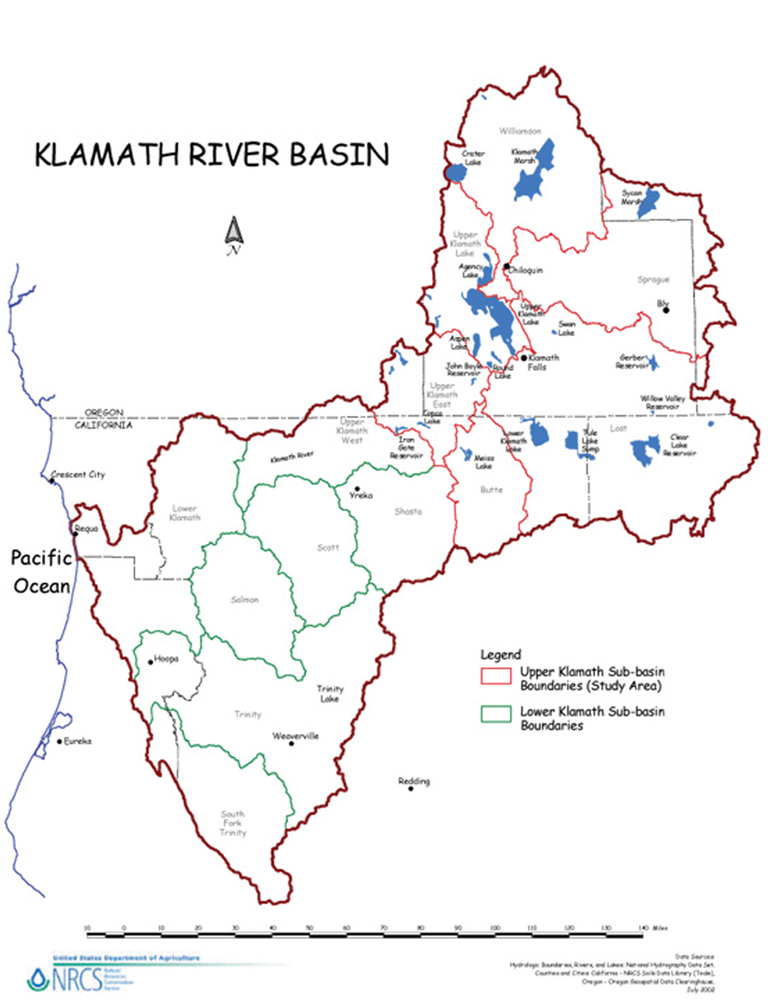
Major sub-watersheds in the Klamath Basin

The Klamath River watershed, known as the Klamath Basin, drains parts of Klamath, Lake and Jackson Counties in Oregon and Siskiyou, Modoc, Trinity, Humboldt and Del Norte Counties in California. About 37 percent of the basin is in Oregon and 63 percent is in California. More than half of the Klamath Basin is managed by the U.S. Forest Service, on the Fremont, Winema, and Rogue River National Forests in Oregon and the Modoc, Klamath, Shasta-Trinity and Six Rivers National Forests in California. The Klamath Basin borders the Smith, Rogue and Umpqua River watersheds to the northwest, the Mad and Eel River watersheds to the southwest, the Sacramento River watershed to the southeast, and various closed basins of interior Oregon to the northeast.

Hydrologically, the Upper Klamath Basin is considered to be upstream from the former site of Iron Gate Dam, about 190 miles (310 km) from the river's mouth. Most of the Upper Klamath Basin is in Oregon, with some parts extending south into California. Situated between the Cascades and the Oregon high desert and northwest of the Modoc Plateau, it features a semi-arid climate and is characterized by large, flat alluvial valleys separated by long mountain ridges. Elevations range from 4,000 to 4,500 ft (1,200 to 1,400 m) in the valleys to 7,000 to 9,000 ft (2,100 to 2,700 m) in the Cascades. The mountain ridges are forested, while the valleys mostly consist of wetlands or farmland. Although many streams flowing into Upper Klamath Lake derive their flow from snowmelt, its largest sources – the Williamson and Wood Rivers – are predominantly fed by large springs.

Upper and Lower Klamath Lakes and Tule Lake were once part of 350,000 acres (140,000 ha) of connected wetlands, over three-quarters of which have been drained for agriculture. The 3,000-square-mile (7,800 km^{2}) Lost River basin, situated east and south of Klamath Falls, was historically a closed basin terminating at Tule Lake. During high water events, the Klamath River overflowed into Lost River Slough near Klamath Falls and flow into Tule Lake. A topographic constriction occurred further west at the Keno Reef, a bedrock barrier where water backed up during flood events and flowed south along Klamath Straits into Lower Klamath Lake. Since the 20th century, the Lost River and Lower Klamath Lake basins – as well as the neighboring Butte Valley–Meiss Lake basin – have been artificially altered to discharge floodwaters into the Klamath River via diversion dams and drainage facilities.

The Lower Klamath Basin, consisting mostly of mountains and coniferous forest, is located almost entirely in California except for the headwaters of a few tributaries that flow south from Oregon. The Klamath Mountains include numerous sub-ranges, with the Siskiyou Mountains to the north and west of the river, and the Marble Mountains and Salmon Mountains to the east and south. These mountains experience heavy winter snowfall, while summers are warm and dry with little precipitation. Closer to the coast, winters are cool with heavy rainfall, while summer temperatures are mild and often foggy. About 88 percent of the Klamath River's total flow originates in the Lower Basin, even though it only accounts for 62 percent of the land area. The Trinity River is the largest sub-basin of the Lower Klamath; the main stem originates in the Trinity Alps west of Redding, while the South Fork Trinity River's origin at North Yolla Bolly Mountain is the southernmost point in the entire Klamath Basin. Much of the Lower Klamath and Trinity River basins are bounded on the west by South Fork Mountain, which forms one of the longest continuous ridgelines in North America. South Fork Mountain defines much of the boundary between the Klamath Mountains and the Northern Coast Ranges.

Most of the Lower Klamath Basin is remote and rugged, with limited access routes. In California, SR 96 provides access to the entire stretch of the middle Klamath River from Hornbrook to the Trinity River, while SR 299 runs along the Trinity River between Willow Creek and Junction City. SR 169 follows most of the lower Klamath below the Trinity, except for an unconstructed segment between river miles 8–23 (13–37 km) which is only accessible by boat. Although the Lower Klamath Basin is almost entirely covered by mountains, there are also several prominent valleys used for agriculture. Shasta Valley in Siskiyou County is the largest, and is characterized by volcanic features such as basalt flows and lava caves. The Shasta River flows northwest through the valley from Mount Shasta, the highest point in the Klamath River basin at 14,161 ft (4,316 m). Yreka and Montague are located within Shasta Valley. To the west is the smaller Scott Valley, which includes the towns of Fort Jones, Etna, Greenview and Callahan. Hayfork Valley and the community of Hayfork are located in Trinity County, while Hoopa Valley and the surrounding Hoopa Reservation are on the Trinity River in Humboldt County.

=== Tributaries and sub-basins ===
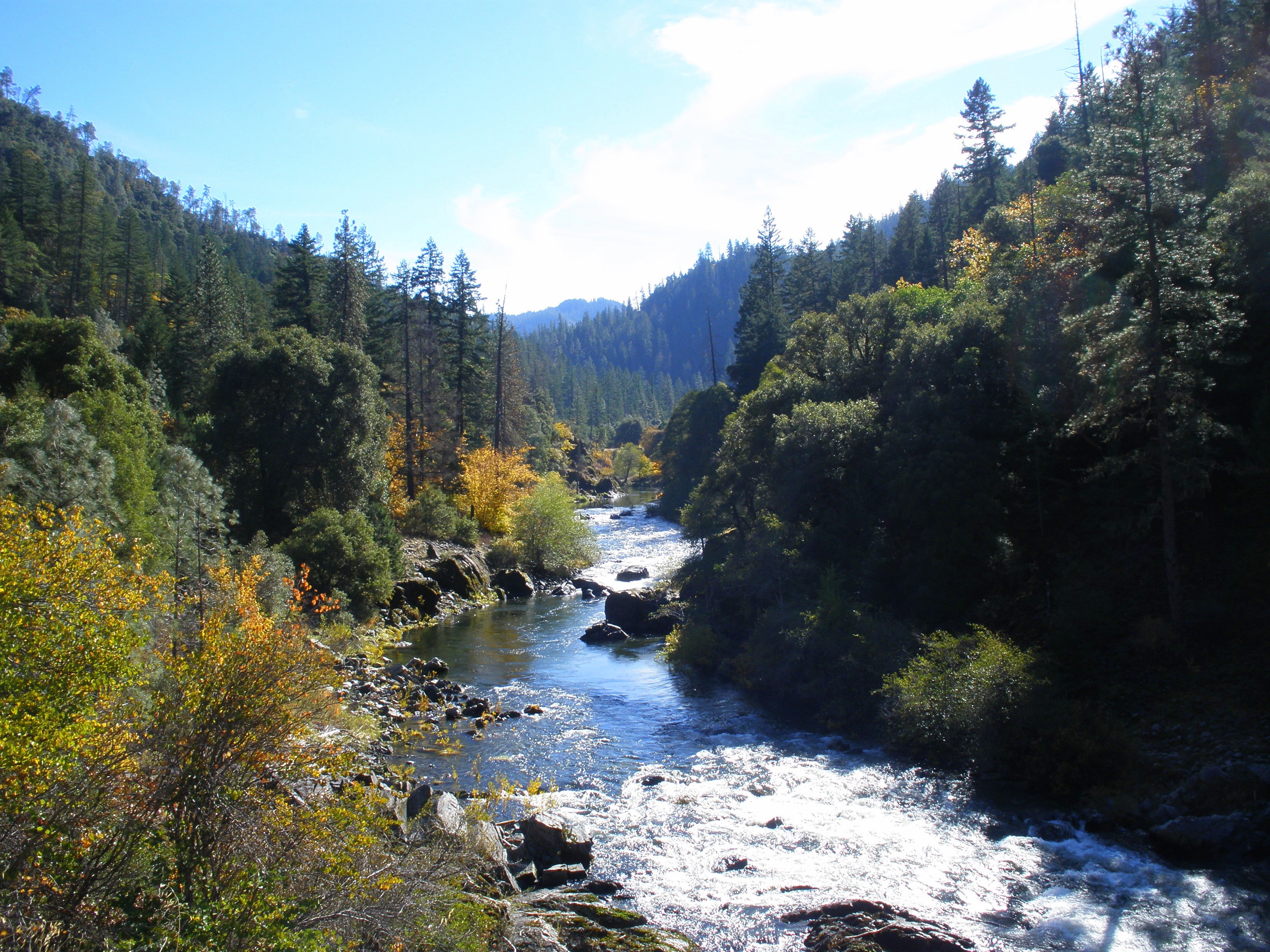
California's Salmon River is a major tributary of the lower Klamath River.

The below table lists major sub-basins of the Klamath River system.

Name	Basin size	Mouth coordinates	Mouth elevation
Link River/ Upper Klamath Lake	3,768 mi^{2} (9,767 km^{2})	42°13′08″N 121°47′18″W	4,088 ft (1,246 m)
Lost River (Note: Connected artificially to the Klamath River via Lost River Diversion Channel.)	2,960 mi^{2} (4,766 km^{2})	41°56′24″N 121°30′19″W	4,036 ft (1,230 m)
Shasta River	791 mi^{2} (2,050 km^{2})	41°49′51″N 122°35′39″W	2,024 ft (617 m)
Scott River	802 mi^{2} (2,079 km^{2})	41°46′44″N 123°02′06″W	1,604 ft (489 m)
Salmon River	748 mi^{2} (1,939 km^{2})	41°22′39″N 123°29′36″W	466 ft (142 m)
Trinity River	2,936 mi^{2} (7,610 km^{2})	41°11′05″N 123°42′31″W	190 ft (58 m)

== Flooding ==
The lower and middle sections of the Klamath River are vulnerable to flooding, and major floods have occurred in years where major flooding has taken place in Northern California, particularly in the wake of Pineapple Express storms that bring large amounts of warm rain to Northern California. Fort Ter-Waw, located at what is now the town of Klamath Glen, was destroyed by the flood in December 1861 and abandoned on June 10, 1862. Other significant floods on the Klamath River have occurred in 1926–1927, 1955, 1964, 1997, and 2005, in several cases changing the course of the river. The Christmas flood of 1964 was particularly devastating. The Klamath River reached flows of 557,000 cubic feet per second (15,800 m^{3}/s), with high water reaching 55 feet (17 m), inundating the towns of Klamath and Klamath Glen under as much as 15 feet (4.6 m) of water, and destroying most of the Highway 101 bridge crossing the river. The highway bridge was rebuilt in a different location, though entrances to the old bridge still stand.

The mouth of the Klamath and nearby sections of the river are also susceptible to oceanic tsunami surges, and fatalities have occurred there during the 1964 Alaskan and 2011 Japanese tsunamis.

== Geology ==
The Upper Klamath Basin, defined by the drainage area of the Klamath River above Iron Gate Dam, is a unique transitional area between the Cascade Range to the west and the Basin and Range Province of the northern Great Basin to the southeast. This region extends from the southern Lower Klamath Lake area into the Lost River and Upper Klamath Lake basins. Crustal stretching and block faulting created a topography with characteristics similar to both regions. Almost the entire basin is a graben region, bearing basin and range characteristics, formed by uplifting and subsidence along several north–south faults.

Pre-Quaternary, igneous and sedimentary rocks compose the Yonna Formation, which crosses much of the region and rises above the surface in large outcroppings of solid rock in many of the ridges. Underlying rocks are generally younger from east to west. The many ridges crossing the upper Klamath Basin divide it into valleys with up to 330 feet (100 m) of vertical relief, and drainage patterns generally follow the topography. An extensive geothermal system occurs deep underground within the upper basin, creating hot springs and artesian springs, but is not well understood. Further south, in the Shasta River area in Siskiyou County, much of the underlying rock is composed of lava flows issuing from the Mount Shasta volcanic region.

The same age pattern is true in the Cascade Range and Klamath Mountains that cover the western half of the Klamath River watershed. As the North American Plate moved slowly southwestward over the past 10 million years, successive oceanic terranes dating from the Cambrian to the late Jurassic were added to the bulk of the North American continent. There are four distinct terranes from west to east. While the coastal mountains date to less than 3 million years ago, the farther inland High Cascades are as old as 7.5 million years. Granite batholiths, overlying sedimentary rock, and volcanic rock were crumpled into the massif of southwestern Oregon and northwestern California.

The Klamath River is a superimposed stream. That is, the river cut its way through rising topography and maintained a southwesterly course to the Pacific Ocean, instead of flowing to the south which would be the natural drainage path from the Upper Klamath Basin today.

== Indigenous peoples ==
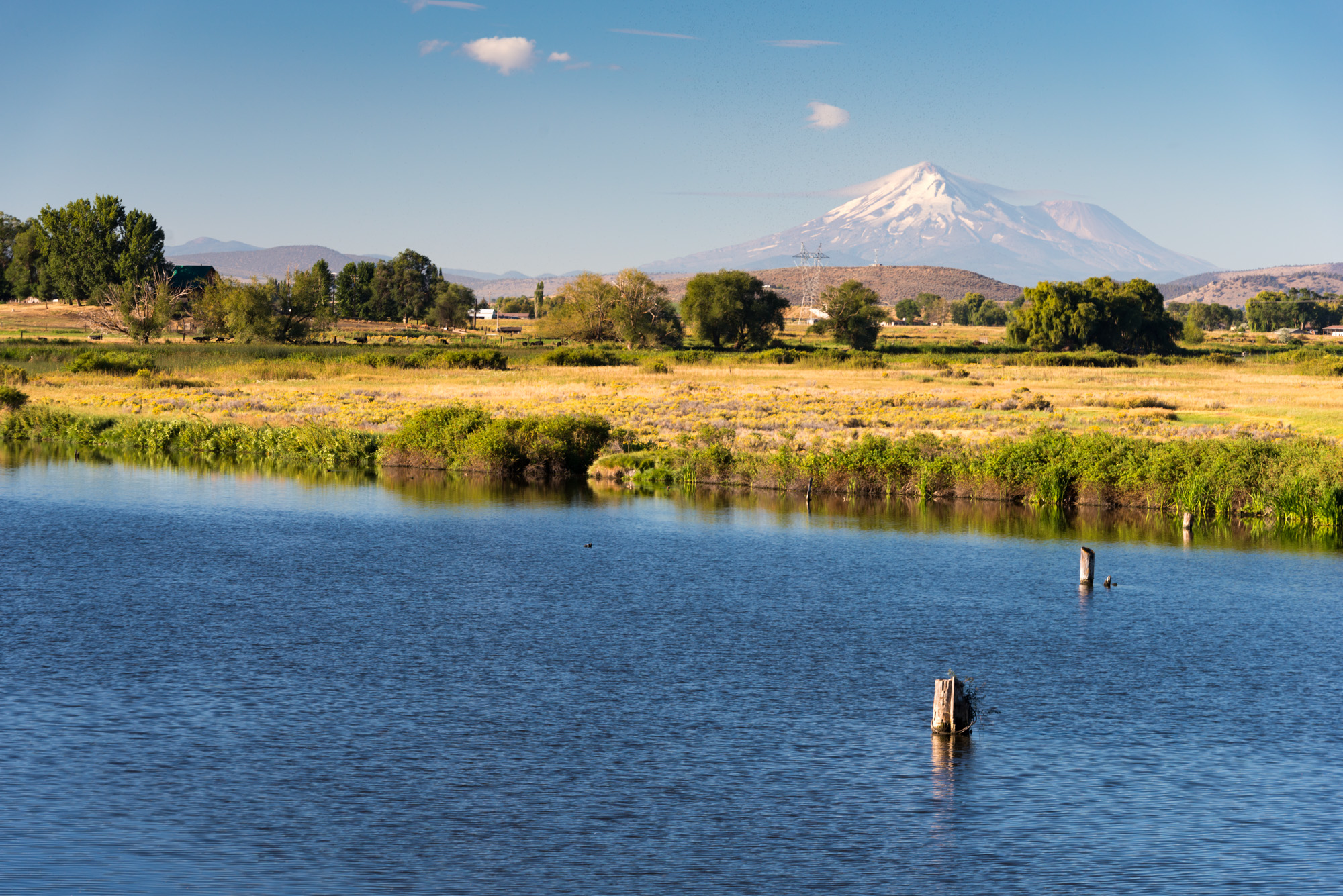
View of the upper Klamath River and Mount Shasta from near Klamath Falls. This area was once on the border of Klamath and Modoc territory.

Human habitation on the Klamath dates to at least 7,000 years ago. Many of the Native American groups along the river depended on the huge runs of Pacific salmon, the third largest on the Pacific coast of what is now the United States. These groups included the Shasta along the middle and upper parts of the river, the Yurok, Hupa, and Karuk along the canyons of the lower river, and the Modoc, Klamath and Yahooskin in the desert valleys of the upper basin. Along with the Hupa and Karuk, the lower to mid-upper Tribes caught salmon from the river with weirs, basket traps and harpoons. Ishi Pishi Falls, a set of rapids on the Klamath River near the confluence with the Salmon River, has been a traditional fishing ground of the Karuk people.

Tribes of the upper basin were primarily hunter-gatherers, and did not depend on salmon as much as downstream tribes. The Klamath River's name was recorded by Europeans in the 19th century derived from the word klamet or the Klamath Tribe. Prior to European contact, the river was called by many different names, including Ishkêesh and Koke. The Klamath Tribe's name came from the Upper Chinookan word /ɬámaɬ/, literally "they of the river".

The tribes along the Klamath River, in their hunting, fishing, and landscape stewardship practices, employed traditional ecological knowledge (TEK). Traditional ecological knowledge describes the type of natural science information that indigenous people have gathered about the places they live in over the course of hundreds, if not thousands, of years. It encompasses knowledge, beliefs, and practices that native people have accumulated through their immersive stewardship of the natural world. On the Klamath River, tribes have historically used traditional ecological knowledge to care for and manage their landscape, especially the use of controlled burning.

The Klamath tribal land stewardship practice of cultural burning was first disrupted with the beginning of Spanish colonization in California in the 1780s. Spanish colonization led to diseases, genocide, forced removal of indigenous people, relocation to missions, and laws banning burning in the region. In the 1840s many white Americans started moving west into the region with the Gold Rush. Many more members of the Klamath tribes were displaced or killed in the destruction of villages and a series of wars over territory, among other threats. Into the 20th century, many Klamath children were separated from their tribes and families and forced to attend boarding schools which attempted to assimilate the children by forcing them to speak English and dress in Western clothing and eat Western foods. This led to a generational disconnect and loss of knowledge of many cultural practices.

=== Yurok ===
The Yurok people think of the Klamath river as "the Bloodline: the life blood of the people" relying on it for foods like salmon (ney-ouy), sturgeon (Kaa-ka), candlefish (kwor-ror), and seaweed (chey-gel’). These foods, specifically fish and specifically from the Klamath river are of utmost important to the culture and religion of the Yurok tribe.

Located along the river are various villages important to specific ceremonial practices of the Yurok, like the Jump Dance or the annual Salmon ceremony. Yurok culture and religion emphasizes direct connection and communication with the Klamath river. Yurok cosmologies and oral histories emphasize the importance of the Klamath river and its salmon as a gift from the creator to provide for the Yurok people. Like the Karuk, the Yurok language references the Klamath river in their descriptions of direction. The cycle of life in the Yurok culture is closely tied to the Klamath and those who have died are thought to take one last boat ride upriver.

For the Yurok people, the health of the river and the salmon is indicative of the health of the tribe, making the current policies surrounding river dams, and declining salmon populations deeply personal. Like with other Klamath Basin Tribes, an annual salmon ceremony takes place to honor and celebrate the salmon, which the Yurok people see as ancestors. The Klamath Salmon Festivals are usually in August and include games, meals, parades, and other ways of celebrating. The Yurok tribe's ceremonies emphasize the Klamath River, and many traditional practices require close proximity to the river and include some type of bathing in or ingesting of the water. Recreational games are played on constructed "courts" along the river banks.

=== Karuk ===
The concept of World Renewal plays heavily into both Karuk and Yurok culture. Although the term "world renewal" was coined by anthropologists Kroeber and Gifford, the Karuk tribe has adopted the phrase to refer to their annual ceremony that they view as essential to maintaining the reciprocal and stewarding relationship they have with the environment. The ceremony is meant to renew and sustain this relationship. Many aspects of the larger ceremony involve being near or on the Klamath river, such as boat dances that take place in canoes and involve giving thanks and gratitude to the river. Salmon are an integral aspect of Karuk identity, culture, and subsistence. Karuk fisherman continue to sustainably fish for Salmon despite their decreasing numbers, drought and myriad other ecological issues. Ishi Pishi falls, located near the town of Somes Bar, remains the traditional location for Karuk men to fish. Karuk fishermen use a traditional dip-net fishing technique using long poles with nets on the end. This style of fishing works to naturally limit the amount of fish caught in a fishing session, thus ensuring that many salmon are able to spawn upstream and resupply the fishery.

The Karuk language also revolves around the Klamath River, and the word "karuk" means "upriver". To indicate uphill, the word maruk is used, meaning away from the river. Conversely, the word saruk, meaning towards the river, is used to indicate downhill.

=== Hupa and Shasta ===
The Hupa Valley tribe hold similar ceremonial and religious beliefs regarding the river as the Yurok and Karuk people, including practices of jump dances and cultural/subsistence reliance on the Klamath's salmon runs.

Shasta people celebrate the first salmon of the season, which they think of as "salmon medicine" with ceremonies similar to the other Klamath basin tribes. Their relationship to the Klamath and its salmon was, and continues to be, deep-seated in their culture.

=== Relationship to US Forest Service ===
In 1905, the United States Forest Service, an agency of the Department of Agriculture headed by Gifford Pinchot – a prominent conservationist and staunch opponent of burning – began to manage what was traditionally Klamath lands. The Forest Service oversaw extensive logging, mining, and dam construction, which degraded much of the environment, particularly salmon stocks and redwood forests. In 1947, the lower section of Karuk Aboriginal Territory was made part of the Six Rivers National Forest. In 1964, the first wilderness area in the Klamath basin was designated, effectively banning timber harvesting and road development in the area. Indigenous people were not allowed to steward their traditional territories because the Forest Service believed they would further deplete the damaged ecosystems. This led to a legal battle in 1970 over whether Klamath tribes could fish in these territories. Not until the late 1990s and early 2000s did the Forest Service and Bureau of Land Management start collaborating with tribal peoples in the Offield Mountain Ceremonial Burning project and Tribal Forest Protection Act to incorporate traditional ecological knowledge and stewardship practices into land management.

=== 2025 river descent ===
In the summer of 2025, a group of teenage members of the local indigenous people made a 30-day, 300-mile (480 km) journey, the first canoe descent of the full river in over 100 years. Supported by the international NGO Rios to Rivers, they trained for about two years in whitewater canoeing before putting in at the headwaters. The last three days they were accompanied by representatives from indigenous people around the world who are fighting for the life and freedom of their own rivers from New Zealand, to Chile and China, before reaching the Pacific Ocean in a healing ceremony.

== Exploration and settlement ==
=== Fur trade ===
In the late 1820s, fur trappers of the Hudson's Bay Company traveling south from Fort Vancouver reached the Klamath River basin. The first party to see the Klamath River was led by Alexander McLeod in the winter of 1826–27. In 1828, the Jedediah Smith fur trapping expedition was helped across the Trinity River by the Yurok and camped on the east side of the Trinity River. His clerk, Harrison G. Rogers, wrote, "Mr. Smith purchases all the beaver furs he can from them," suggesting that beaver were then plentiful on the Trinity. Joseph Grinnell, in Fur-bearing Mammals of California, noted that beaver had been present on other Klamath River tributaries such as the Scott River and Shasta River, and further cited a Fish and Game report of beaver from 1915 to 1917 on High Prairie Creek at the mouth of the Klamath River near Requa, California. Fur trappers eventually moved southwest into the Sacramento Valley and extended the Siskiyou Trail, an early path between the Oregon Territory and San Francisco Bay.

Within a matter of years, the plentiful beaver in the Klamath Basin had been mostly wiped out. Beaver dams had previously been an important factor in stream habitat in the Klamath River watershed, helping to moderate the power of floods and creating extensive wetlands. The loss of the beaver dams resulted in detrimental consequences for watercourses in the basin, exacerbating the power of winter floods, and causing severe erosion. Despite the environmental implications, extensive and fertile meadows left behind by the draining of beaver ponds attracted many settlers to the region later on.

=== Gold rush ===
Klamath River ever since the discovery of gold in its bed has been continuously mined and is still a long way from being worked out. The conditions for river mining in this stream are very favorable. Though carrying a large volume of water, it has nearly everywhere a considerable grade and velocity of current with no great depth ...

... At the present time there are about twenty-five claims being worked on the Klamath and Salmon Rivers, employing three hundred men. Operations in this locality are generally on a small scale and involve the use of but little capital.

— R.L. Dunn (1889)

The 1850s saw discoveries of rich placer and lode gold deposits along the predominantly Shasta areas of the Klamath, Trinity, Shasta and other rivers in northwestern California. The gold is thought to have originated from volcanic activity in the Klamath Mountains. Miners searching for gold in the Klamath Mountains and Trinity Alps in the aftermath of the California Gold Rush first discovered gold along Salmon Creek in the spring of 1850, and additional deposits were found on the main stem by July. Gold was also discovered in great quantities in Shasta lands at French Gulch and Yreka.

The Gold Rush was the first large incursion into the Klamath River region, and conflict soon broke out between tribes and gold seekers. As miners established claims along the river, they forced indigenous peoples from their settlements and fishing grounds; many natives were killed, while others died of introduced diseases. Several place names in the Klamath Basin originate from this era, including that of the Scott River, which is named for pioneer John Walter Scott. Gold deposits are still present in the Klamath River watershed even though it was mined far past the end of the gold rush.

After the establishment of California in 1850, the state government signed treaties with the Karuk establishing aboriginal territories, but the treaties were never ratified in the senate and so the Karuk never got their own reservation land. In 1864, the Native Americans of the Klamath Basin and surrounding area signed a treaty that had them cede 20 million acres (8,100,000 ha) of land to the United States and forced them to move to the newly created Klamath Indian Reservation. This reservation clumped the Yurok, Karuk, and Hoopa tribes into one small area. These reservation lands were created as a result of wars between American settlers and indigenous peoples including the Red Cap War in 1855. The US government wanted to stop these violent clashes and relegate the indigenous people to limited territory where they could be sovereign.

The reservation policy was reversed in 1887 with the Dawes Act which designated allotments to individuals of indigenous descent who could stake claim. However into the 1920s many of these individual land owners sold away their allotments to timber companies as they could not afford the taxes. Eventually, the tribes began to profit from the sale of timber produced on the reservation, although unfairly distributed because of the lack of consideration of the three differing tribes. In 1954, however, Congress removed their federal recognition and the reservation was no longer economically successful. The tribes won back federal recognition in the 1970s, but by then poverty was widespread among tribal members. Additionally more indigenous land was lost in the 1970s after the completion of the construction of a section of highway 96 which ran through traditional Karuk territory and paved over cemeteries, villages, spiritual sites and allotments.

=== Industry and development in the 20th century ===
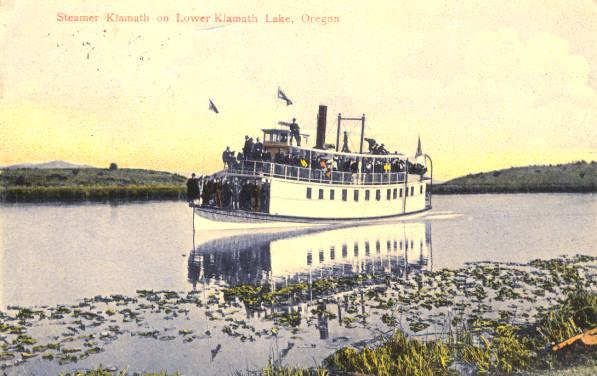
The Klamath on Lower Klamath Lake, 1908

Beginning in the early 20th century, steamboats began operating on Lower Klamath Lake between Siskiyou County, California, and Klamath Falls, Oregon. The steamboats completed a link between Klamath Falls and a railroad branch line following the McCloud River—the final part of which was called the Bartle Fast Freight Road, after Bartle, California. The end of this line, Laird's Landing, was the beginning of the Lower Klamath Lake steamboat line, which began operating with an 80-foot (24 m) screw steamer in 1905. By 1909, however, the railroad had circumnavigated Lower Klamath Lake directly to Klamath Falls. The steamboat line fell into disuse—and much of Lower Klamath Lake was later drained and filled in.

In the early 1910s and 1920s, logging was a growing industry on the west side of the upper Klamath River valley, especially around Upper Klamath Lake. The Great Northern Railway and Southern Pacific Railroad built a joint-use line running along the eastern shore of the lake, delivering logs from the north side to a sawmill 3 miles (4.8 km) downstream from the outlet of the lake. Many of the seasonal marshlands surrounding the lake and rivers were diked in this period to host lumber operations. In 1919, the first Link River Dam, a timber crib dam, was constructed at the outlet of Upper Klamath Lake, raising it by about 16 feet (5 m). Steamboats continued mail, passenger and freight operations on Upper Klamath Lake until about 1928, in a period when many of the lumber companies shut down due to drought.

== Economic uses and water management ==
=== Irrigation ===
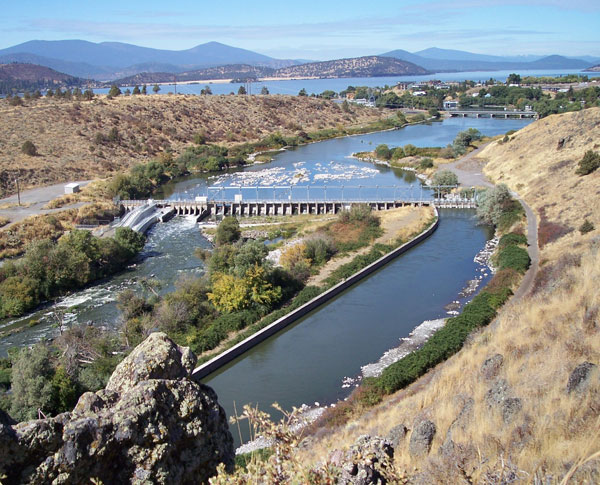
View of Link River Dam, the A Canal (right) and Link River (left). Upper Klamath Lake is visible in the distance.

About 500,000 acres (200,000 ha) of farmland are irrigated in the Upper Klamath Basin, divided between the federal Klamath Irrigation Project (Note: This is usually called the Klamath Project, but will be referred to as such to distinguish from other projects with similar names.) located south of Upper Klamath Lake, and various local and private irrigation districts, mostly located north of the lake. In 1905, the Reclamation Service (today's U.S. Bureau of Reclamation) was authorized to construct the Klamath Irrigation Project, to drain and reclaim for agriculture over 250,000 acres (100,000 ha) of former lake beds and wetlands. The first homesteaders moved onto project lands in 1917, while expansions of the project continued into the 1940s.

The Klamath Irrigation Project includes 185 miles (298 km) of main canals, chief of which are the A Canal which delivers water south from Upper Klamath Lake, dividing into the B Canal which heads east towards the Lost River Valley and the C Canal which heads south towards Tule Lake Valley. A diversion channel was opened to carry floodwaters from the Lost River to the Klamath, and a tunnel excavated to drain the remaining waters of Tule Lake towards Lower Klamath Lake, where the Klamath Straits Drain conveys excess water back to the Klamath River near Keno. A cut was blasted through Keno Reef, the natural bedrock barrier that historically backed up floodwaters into Lower Klamath Lake. This enabled the near complete draining of both Tule and Lower Klamath Lakes.

Link River Dam (originally built as part of the Klamath Hydroelectric Project in 1921) controls the level of Upper Klamath Lake, creating the project's main storage reservoir. The dam did not actually raise the water level, but was built within an artificial cut made in the lake's outlet, enabling water to be released consistently from deeper levels. Prior to the cut, south winds sometimes pushed water out of the lake's shallow outlet, causing the Link River to run dry – a phenomenon reflected in the stream's native Klamath name, Yulalona, "back and forth". The project includes two other storage facilities at Clear Lake Dam on the Lost River and Gerber Dam on Miller Creek (a tributary of Lost River). Parts of Lower Klamath and Tule Lakes are designated as sumps, reserved for flood control and drainage.

In normal precipitation years, the Klamath Irrigation Project delivers 320,000 to 400,000 acre-feet (390,000,000 to 490,000,000 m^{3}) of water to farmers, although this can be substantially less in drought years. The main crops grown on the Klamath Irrigation Project are grain, alfalfa, onions, potatoes and grass seed, as well as irrigated pasture for cattle. In 2011, crops grown on the Project were valued at about $204 million.

=== Water rights ===
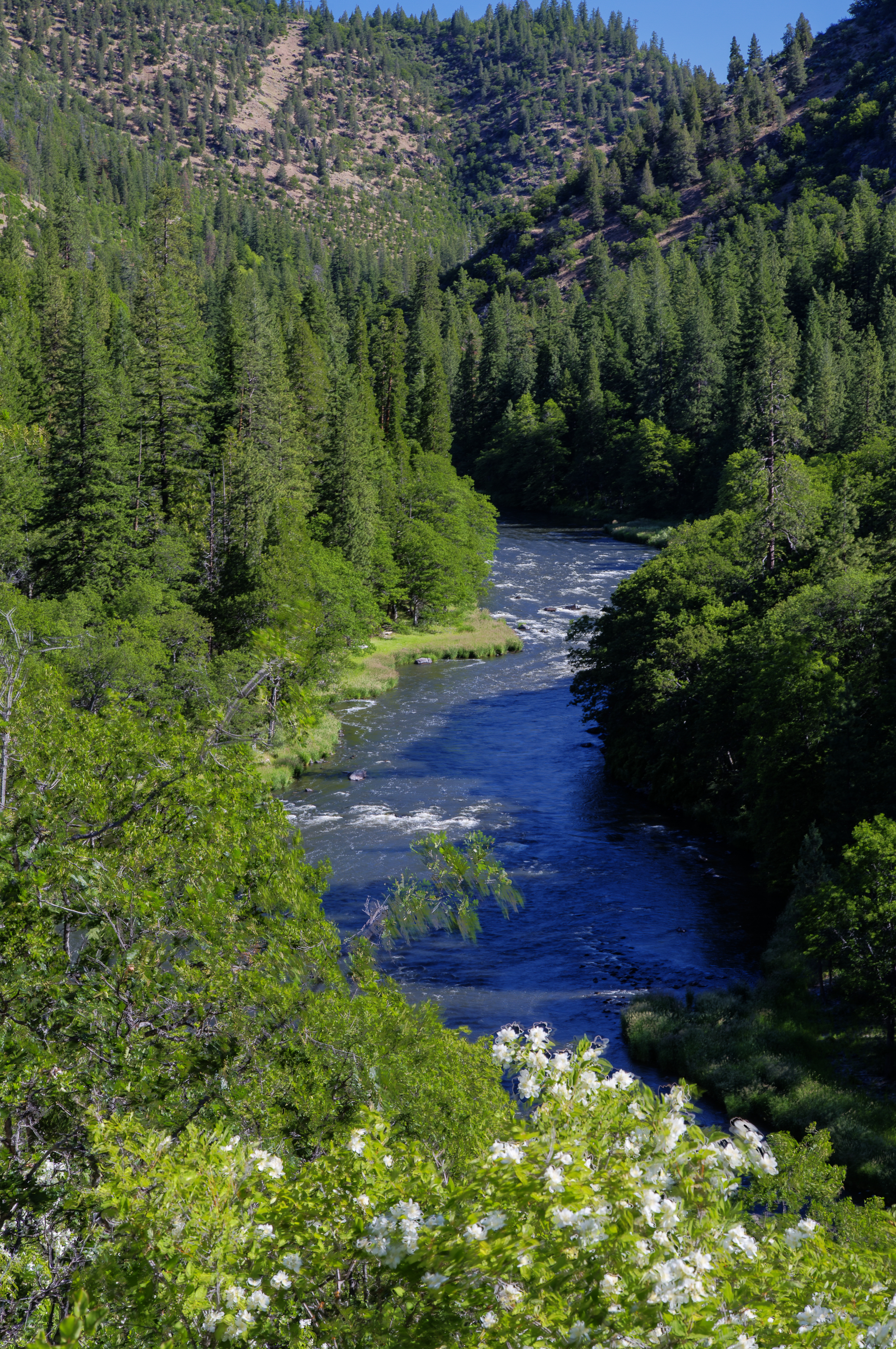
The Klamath River in Oregon

Because most precipitation falls in the Lower Klamath Basin while most agricultural demand occurs in the Upper Basin, the latter suffers from frequent water shortages. Traditionally, water rights have been determined by prior appropriation, as in the case of most of the western US. In 1957, California and Oregon signed the Klamath River Compact, which gave preference to the "higher uses" of domestic and irrigation water supply, over the "lower uses" of recreation, fish and wildlife, industry and power generation. Among other requirements, the Compact established that all water diverted from the upper Klamath River must be used within the Upper Klamath Basin. No such restriction applies to the Lower Basin. In addition, the Compact does not impact water rights vested prior to 1957.

In Oregon, the Klamath Basin Adjudication (KBA) – legal validation of pre-1909 water claims – is an ongoing process. This has had significant consequences for water management in the Upper Klamath Basin, as the Klamath Tribes were guaranteed water for hunting and fishery purposes in the 1864 treaty establishing their reservation. Even though the Klamath were forced to surrender treaty lands in the mid-20th century, the tribes' water rights were upheld in a 1983 court decision (United States vs. Adair), and Oregon formally quantified their share in 2012. The Klamath Tribes independently exercised their water rights for the first time in 2013, a drought year, when a "water call" reduced irrigation diversions to maintain sufficient river flow for fisheries.

During a severe drought in 2001, federal water deliveries to farmers were temporarily halted to satisfy Endangered Species Act requirements and tribal fisheries. A group of farmers sued the U.S. government for $30 million in lost income caused by the 2001 irrigation shut-off (Baley v. United States). In 2017, the Court of Federal Claims ruled in favor of the government, as the water restrictions had been enacted, in part, on behalf of the tribes' senior water rights. Klamath Project customers were only entitled to receive water after the tribes' water rights had been met, so the government was not responsible for damages. The Supreme Court declined to hear the case in 2020, thus cementing the lower court's decision.

=== Interbasin transfers ===
Several projects have been constructed to divert water out of the Klamath Basin for use in other parts of California and Oregon. The Trinity River Division of the Bureau of Reclamation's Central Valley Project consists of Trinity and Lewiston Dams on the upper Trinity River, and a series of tunnels and power plants that convey water to the Sacramento River. Starting in 1963, these works directed about 1,200,000 acre-feet (1.5 km^{3}) per year out of the Trinity River, representing about one-tenth of the total runoff of the Klamath-Trinity River system. Trinity River water was a key factor in the development of the Westlands Water District, today one of the most productive agricultural areas in California, on the west side of the San Joaquin Valley. From 1987 to 2000, Trinity River diversions averaged 730,000 acre-feet (0.90 km^{3}), as greater amounts of water were released to the Trinity River for fisheries restoration.

The Rogue River Basin Project provides water for the Rogue River Valley around Medford, Oregon. The Fourmile Lake Dam and Hyatt Dam, which divert water from tributaries of the Klamath River into the Rogue River system, were originally built by private irrigation companies in the 1920s. In 1954, the Bureau of Reclamation was authorized to expand the project. Howard Prairie Reservoir, in the upper part of Jenny Creek watershed, was completed in 1959. The Bureau also constructed Green Springs Power Plant, which generates power using water diverted from Jenny Creek, and rehabilitated and expanded other existing reservoirs and canals. An annual average of 30,400 acre-feet (37,500,000 m^{3}) are diverted from the Klamath Basin to the Rogue River Valley.

The Klamath's plentiful flow at its mouth has long been of interest to more populous parts of California, which often experience water shortages. In a 1951 report titled the United Western Investigation, the Bureau of Reclamation proposed building the enormous Ah Pah Dam that would have diverted almost the entire flow of the Klamath and Trinity Rivers to Southern California. It would have flooded most Yurok and Hupa lands along the river, but the government mostly ignored objections raised by the tribes. However, the dam was opposed by one of its chief beneficiaries – the Metropolitan Water District of Southern California, representing Los Angeles and numerous other cities – who believed that the Klamath project would be used to pressure it into giving up its share of the Colorado River. As such, the project was scrapped due to lack of political support.

In the 1960s, the California Department of Water Resources also looked to the Klamath River as a supply for the State Water Project. Its own North Coastal Area Investigation in 1964 contemplated damming the Klamath, Trinity, Eel, Van Duzen and Mad Rivers to direct 12,000,000 acre-feet (15 km^{3}) – comparable to the entire flow of the Colorado River – to agricultural and urban areas in central and southern California. About half of this would come from the Klamath River alone. As the environmental movement strengthened in the late 1960s, public pressure mounted to protect California's remaining undammed rivers. In 1972, the state designated the Klamath River downstream of Iron Gate Dam as a wild and scenic river, and in 1981 it was incorporated into the National Wild and Scenic Rivers System, making it off-limits to new dams.

=== Hydroelectricity ===
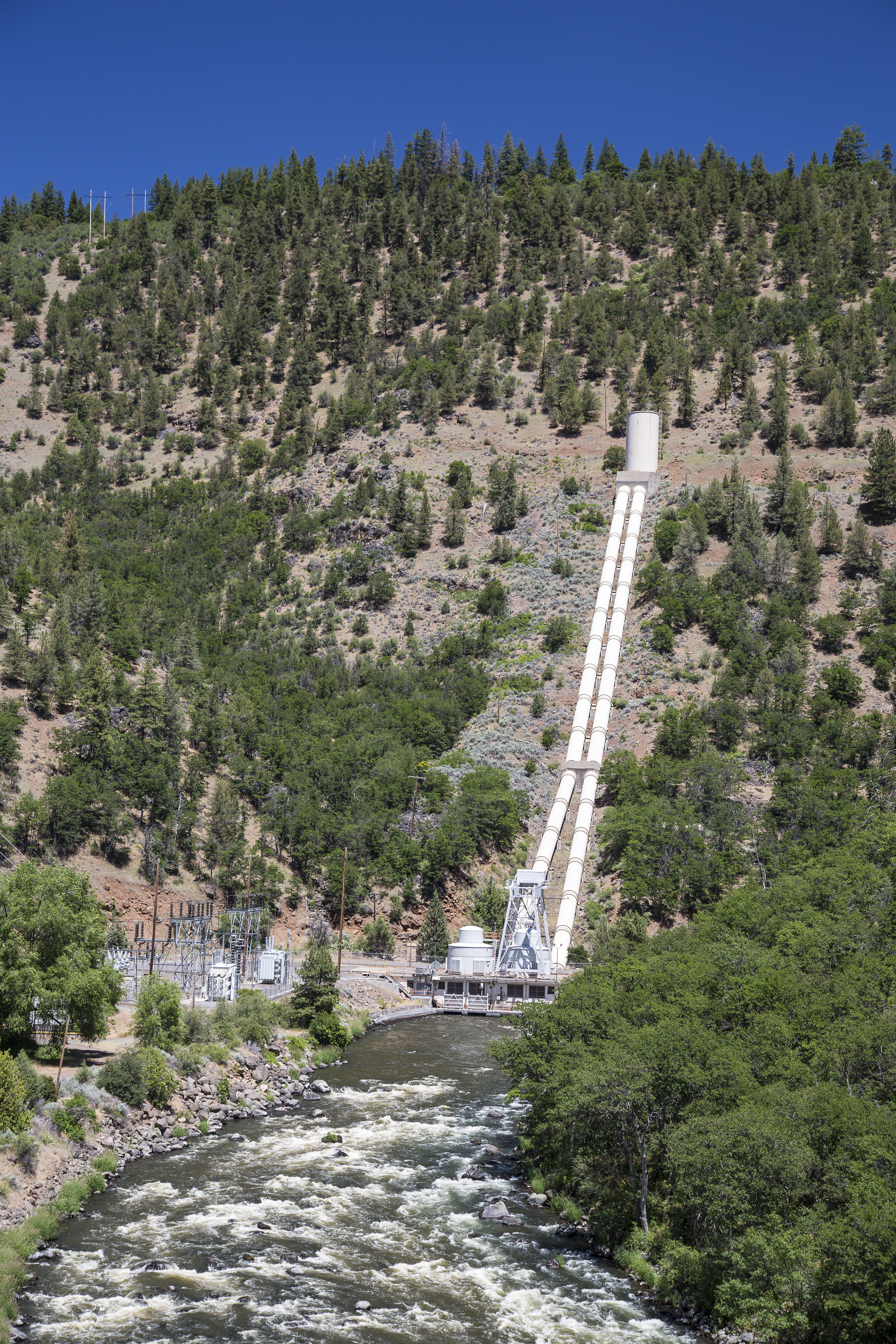
Klamath River below the now decommissioned J.C. Boyle Dam power house in southern Oregon

The oldest hydroelectric plant in the Klamath Basin is the Fall Creek power plant, built in 1903 by the Siskiyou Electric Power Company. This dammed a small tributary of the Klamath River to provide power for Yreka and Dunsmuir, California. In 1911, the California-Oregon Power Company (Copco) acquired Siskiyou Electric and the Fall Creek plant. In 1917, Copco entered a partnership with the Reclamation Service to construct and operate the Link River Dam. While the dam's primary purpose was to store water in Upper Klamath Lake for the Klamath Irrigation Project, Copco would benefit from its regulation of the river flow, as it planned to build several power dams downstream in the Klamath River Hydroelectric Project.

In 1918, the Copco #1 Dam was constructed in Ward's Canyon, a steep and narrow stretch of the Klamath River just south of where it enters California. Copco #2 Dam was constructed just downstream in 1925. It diverted water into a penstock, bypassing and dewatering 1.7 miles (2.7 km) of the river. In 1920, Copco acquired another private hydroelectric plant at Keno, and in 1931 it built the Needle Dam there to regulate outflows from Link River Dam. Needle Dam was replaced by the modern Keno Dam after damage from flooding in the winter of 1964–65.

J.C. Boyle Dam, located between Keno and Copco #1 in Oregon, was completed in 1958. Its penstock and power plant bypassed and dewatered another 4.6 miles (7.4 km) of the river. In 1961, Copco merged into Pacific Power and Light (PP&L), now known as PacifiCorp. In 1962, PP&L constructed Iron Gate Dam, just downstream of Copco #2. Its main purpose was to re-regulate power releases from the Copco dams and provide a more steady flow downstream. Prior to Iron Gate's construction, discharge from the Copco dams fluctuated greatly due to peaking power operation, creating hazardous conditions for fishermen and other people using the river.

Before their removal in 2023–24, the J.C. Boyle, Copco #1, Copco #2 and Iron Gate Dams had a combined generating capacity of 163 megawatts, representing about 1.5 percent of PacifiCorp's total energy portfolio. Following the dam removal, PacifiCorp would continue to operate the Fall Creek power plant, while ownership of the Link River and Keno Dams was officially transferred to the Bureau of Reclamation. As of 2024, the aging power generators at Link River Dam are planned to be decommissioned, although the dam itself will remain.

== Ecology ==
=== Wildlife and plants ===
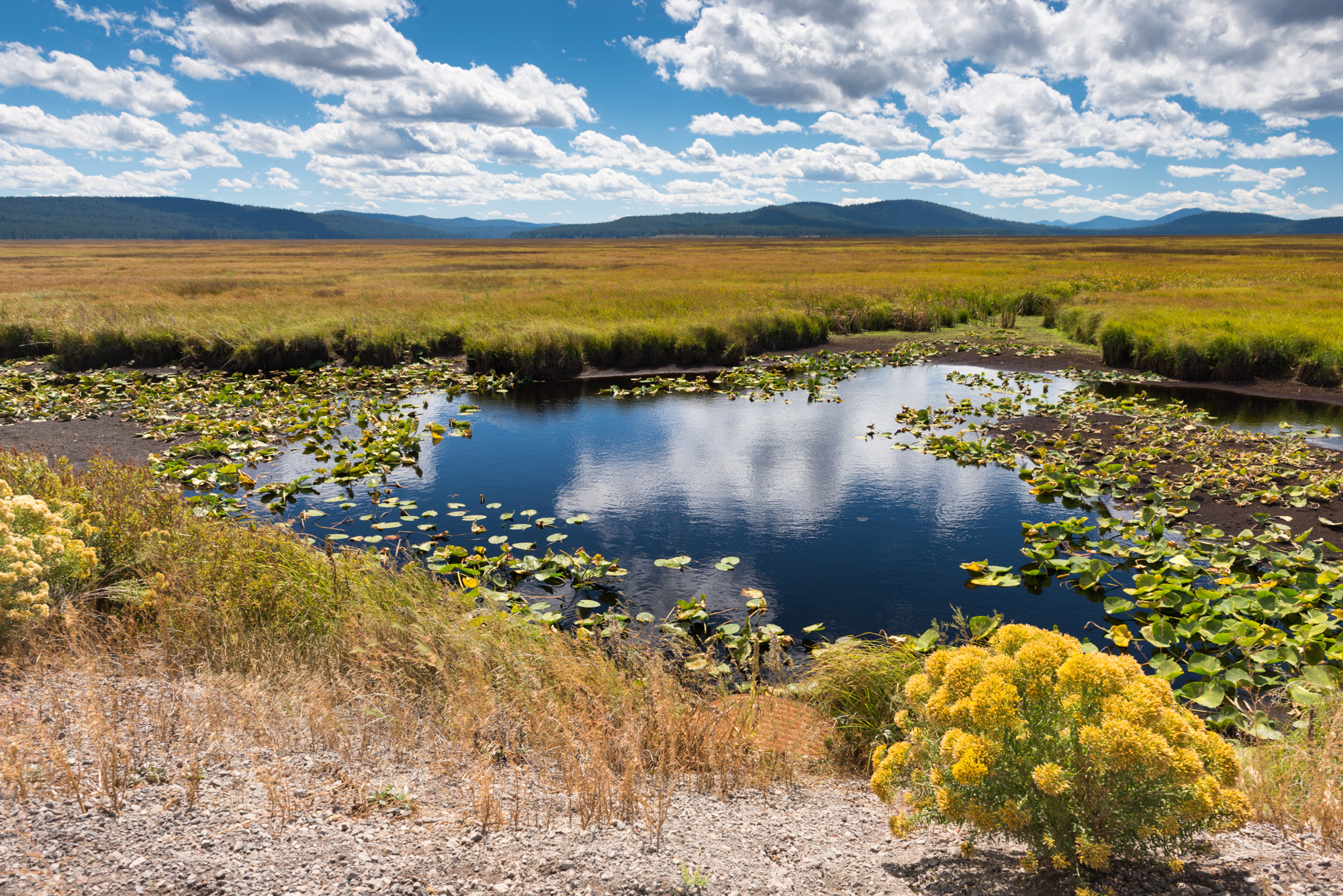
View of the Klamath Marsh National Wildlife Refuge, Oregon

During the 19th century, the Upper Klamath Basin's abundance of wetlands and wildlife led explorers to call it a "western Everglades". Despite the great reduction in wetlands over the 20th century, the Upper Klamath Basin still hosts large concentrations of migrating waterfowl, with as much as 80 percent of birds along the Pacific Flyway passing through. The five units of the Klamath Basin National Wildlife Refuge Complex provide feeding and resting grounds for 3 to 5 million ducks, geese and other waterfowl each year. The area also hosts the largest wintering bald eagle population in the contiguous US. These areas also provide habitat for large mammals such as deer, elk, antelope, bear and cougar; fur-bearers including muskrat, beaver and mink; and upland game birds such as doves, pheasant, grouse and quail. The Lower Klamath Lake unit, established by President Theodore Roosevelt in 1908, is the oldest federal waterfowl refuge in the US.

The Lower Klamath Basin is mostly within the Klamath Mountains ecoregion, which is "widely recognized as an important biodiversity hotspot" due to its location adjacent to Cascades, Sierra Nevada and Coast Range ecoregions. The area includes 3,500 plant species, including over 200 endemic species, many associated with serpentinite soils that are toxic to other plants. The area is known for its conifer diversity, with 29 identified species ranging from coastal redwood forests to inland mixed-conifer forests dominated by Douglas-fir, sugar pine, ponderosa pine, incense cedar, Jeffrey pine and white fir, while upper elevations include Shasta red fir, mountain hemlock, foxtail pine and western white pine. Oak woodlands and shrublands occur at lower elevations, while many exposed ridgetops are grasslands, locally called prairies.

=== Fish ===
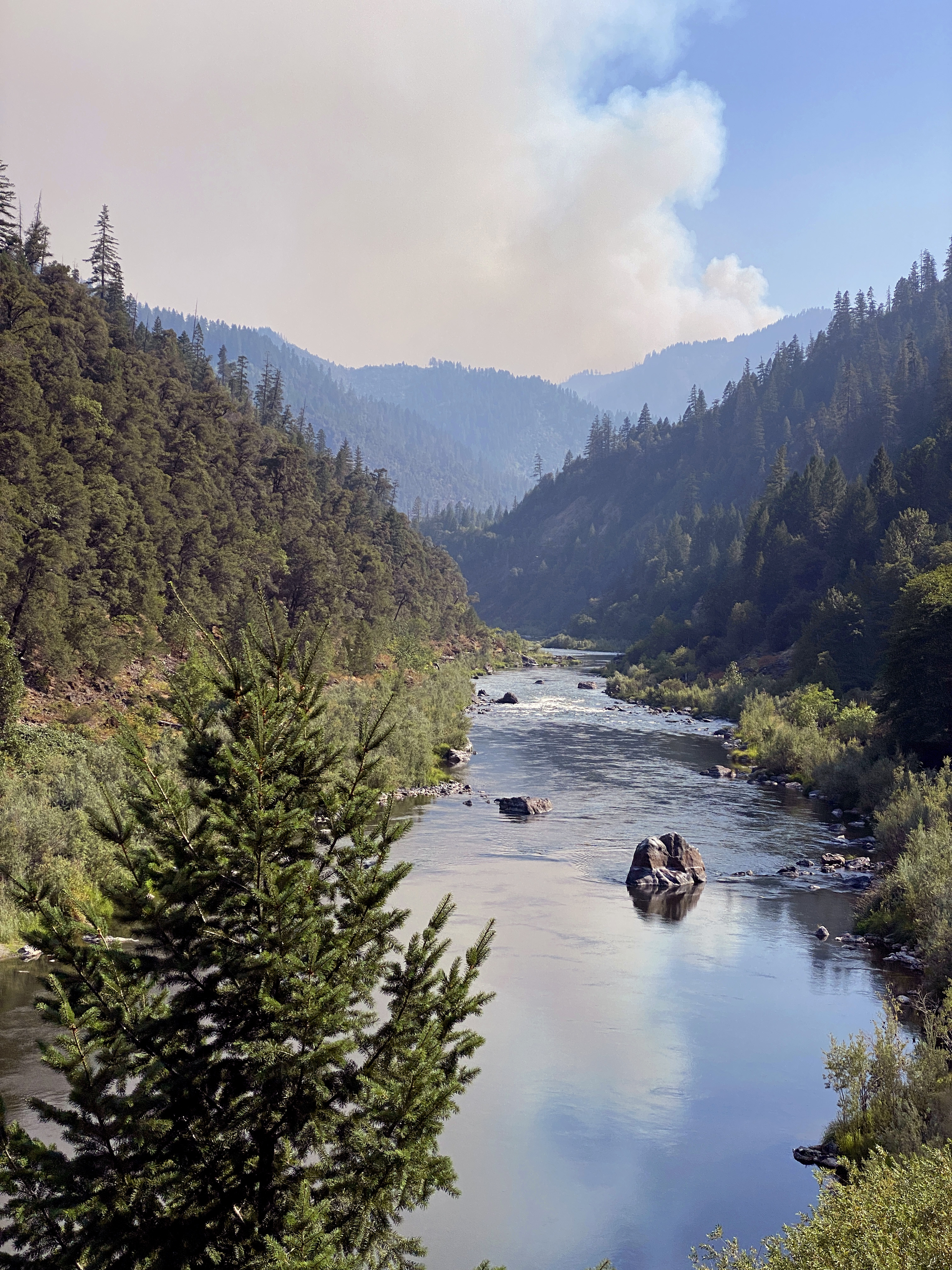
The Klamath River in Siskiyou County, California

The Klamath Basin provides important habitat for anadromous salmonids, particularly Chinook salmon, coho salmon and steelhead trout, which spend their adult lives in the ocean but return to freshwater streams to spawn. The Klamath River system is the third-largest producer of salmon on the west coast of the contiguous United States, after the Columbia and Sacramento Rivers. Before the mid-19th century, 650,000–1,000,000 salmon and steelhead were estimated to spawn in the Klamath each year. Chinook alone numbered up to 800,000, split between fall and spring runs. Before damming, Chinook and steelhead once spawned as far upstream as the Williamson and Sprague Rivers that flow into Upper Klamath Lake. Coho and the anadromous Pacific lamprey spawned nearly as far upstream as Keno, where a naturally occurring constriction and falls (now the site of Keno Dam) prevented further progress. This may have also been a barrier for Chinook and steelhead during low water years. There are some historical accounts of a sockeye salmon run, which disappeared after dam construction. However, kokanee salmon (landlocked sockeye) are still present in Upper Klamath Lake. Small numbers of chum salmon also spawn in the river's lower reaches.

Both the upper and lower Klamath River have resident rainbow, redband, brook and brown trout. Above Upper Klamath Lake, clear spring-fed river systems such as the Williamson and Wood Rivers provide cold water year round and good trout habitat. Bull trout were once widespread throughout both the Upper and Lower Klamath Basins, but today are limited to a few streams above Upper Klamath Lake. Eulachon and green sturgeon were historically common in the lower Klamath River, with much smaller populations today. The Klamath Lake sculpin, Klamath River and Pit-Klamath brook lamprey, Klamath tui chub and blue chub are common in the Upper Klamath Basin. The endangered shortnose sucker and Lost River sucker are endemic to the upper Klamath Basin. Reservoirs and lakes in the Upper Basin host many species of nonnative warm-water game fish, including yellow perch, brown bullhead, and pumpkinseed.

In California, commercial and tribal fishing in the Klamath were banned in 1934 as salmon runs declined. In 1972, following the controversial arrest of a Yurok subsistence fisherman, the Supreme Court ruled in Mattz v. Arnptt that the state did not have jurisdiction over tribal fisheries, as Indian reservations were created by federal executive order. In 1977 the U.S. Bureau of Indian Affairs took over management of the tribal fishery and reopened the lower river to fishing, but it was closed again the next year after conservation groups objected. From 1985 to 2011, ocean fishing for Chinook salmon was also restricted off the California and Oregon coasts. In 1986, the Klamath Fishery Management Council was established to monitor fish populations and recommend annual harvest limits; the following year, it reopened the river to tribal and commercial fishing for adult fall Chinook. After another brief closure from 1991 to 1993 the Department of the Interior revised fishery allocations, setting the tribes' share at 50 percent.

Prior to its 2024 removal, Iron Gate Dam was the lowermost dam on the Klamath River and effectively cut off migration and spawning habitat of 675 to 970 km of spawning and rearing habitat in the Upper Klamath Basin.

=== Environmental issues ===
Gold mining, dam construction, commercial fishing, logging and other human activities heavily damaged anadromous fish runs in the 19th and 20th centuries. The construction of Copco No. 1 Dam in 1918 blocked fish migration to more than 400 miles (640 km) of streams in the Upper Klamath Basin. This dam was built without fish ladders after Copco agreed with the state of California to construct fish hatcheries at Iron Gate and Lewiston as a mitigation measure. Starting in 1963, the Central Valley Project diverted most of the upper Trinity River's flow to the Sacramento Valley, and cut off an additional 109 miles (175 km) of streams in the Trinity watershed. While most of the Klamath River's annual water volume originates in the Lower Basin, the Lower Basin experiences a greater seasonal variation in runoff than the Upper Basin, and thus upstream water diversions can have a substantial impact on downstream river levels at certain times of the year. Outflow from the Upper Basin accounts for only 15 percent of flow at the river's mouth in the winter and spring, but about 40 percent during summer and fall. This can result in critically low river levels during drought years when irrigation demand is high.

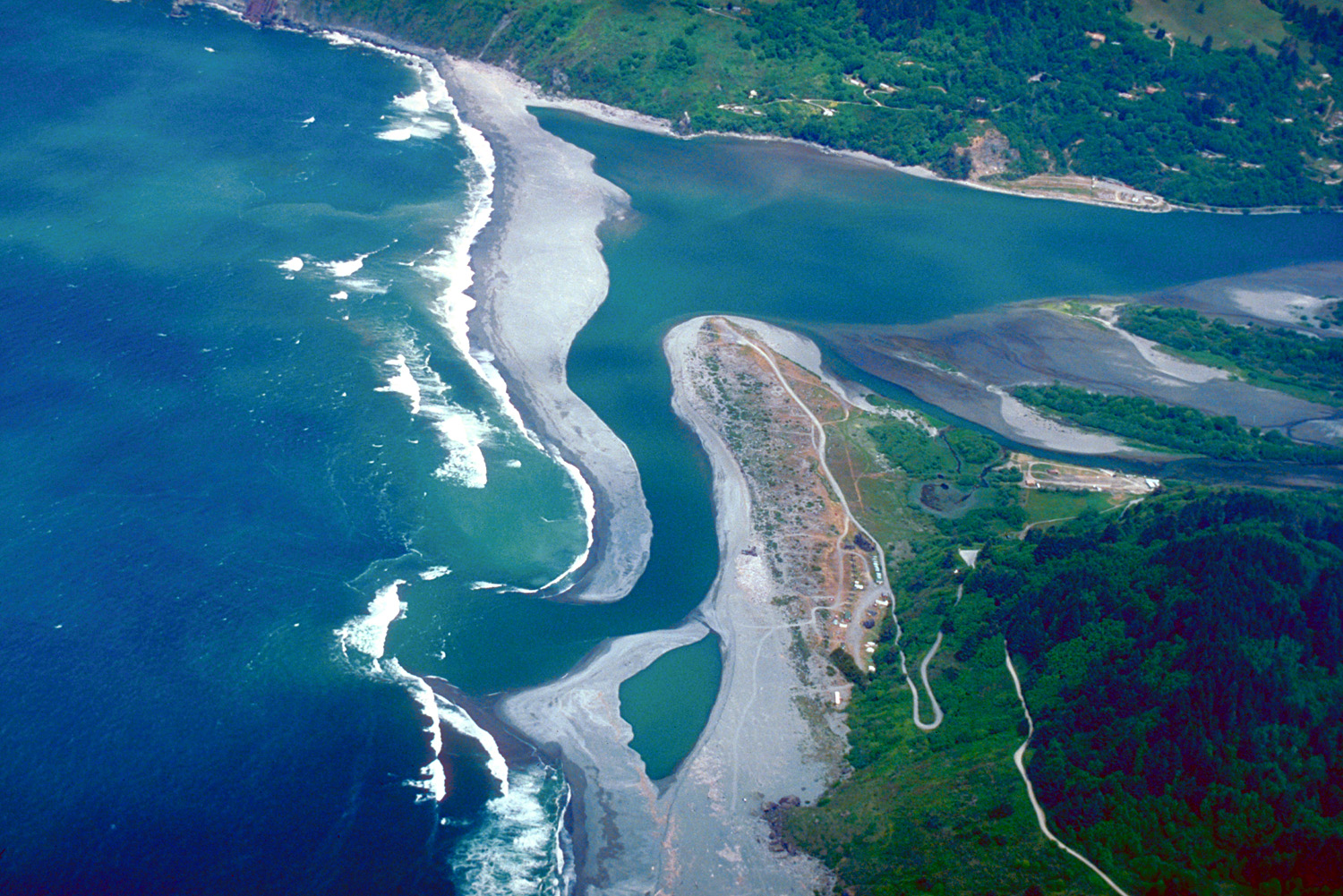
The mouth of the Klamath River on the Pacific Ocean, Del Norte County, California

By 1992, the fall Chinook run had collapsed to just 26,700 spawning adults. This was attributed largely to Central Valley Project diversions on the Trinity River, where salmon numbers had fallen 80 percent since 1963. The Hupa and Yurok Tribes contended that increased instream flows were needed to save the fishery. In 1991, Congress passed the Central Valley Project Improvement Act, directing the Bureau of Reclamation to increase minimum Trinity River flows over a five-year period. The Trinity River Restoration Program was established in 2000, solidifying plans for permanently increased flows. With restoration efforts, the fall Chinook run recovered to 150,000 per year by the 2010s, with the Klamath, Trinity, Salmon, Scott and Shasta rivers all hosting spawning populations.

Spring-run Chinook have continued to decline, averaging less than 2,000 per year in the early 21st century, and are considered at risk of extirpation. The only remaining spawning populations are in the Salmon and South Fork Trinity Rivers. Hybridization with hatchery fish has been a major concern for wild spring-run Chinook in the 21st century. In 2021, the state of California recognized Klamath spring-run Chinook as endangered. Klamath River coho, which spawn only in the fall, have been listed as threatened under the Endangered Species Act since 1997. While most of the natural range of Klamath coho has never been blocked by dams, they have been impacted more severely by habitat degradation related to mining and logging, as they spend more time in freshwater than Chinook.

After the controversial 2001 Klamath Irrigation Project water shut-off, Vice President Dick Cheney intervened to ensure water supply to farmers. In 2002, the government made water deliveries on the project despite the drought continuing. The lower Klamath River experienced a mass die-off of at least 34,000 adult Chinook salmon in September 2002, which was attributed to atypically low flows that delayed salmon migration and high water temperatures that allowed massive spread of ich and columnaris among the waiting fish. The House Natural Resources Committee investigated Vice President Cheney for having released extra water to farmers for political gain. In 2006, a federal judge ordered the Klamath Irrigation Project to maintain higher river releases to protect fisheries.

During dry seasons, the lower Klamath River also experiences elevated phosphorus and nitrogen levels from irrigation run-off, while toxic algae blooms result in eutrophication. These issues were exacerbated by the river's dams, which by slowing flows and exposing more water to solar heating created ideal conditions for algae bloom formation. In 2005, PacifiCorp began the mandatory 50-year Federal Energy Regulatory Commission (FERC) relicensing process for its dams on the Klamath. Tribes and conservation groups opposed the relicensing, arguing that the dams should be removed. FERC ruled that as part of the relicensing, PacifiCorp must install fish ladders on the dams. In 2009 PacifiCorp terminated the relicensing process, remarking that retrofitting the dams would be too expensive and tearing them down made more financial sense.

=== Dam removal ===
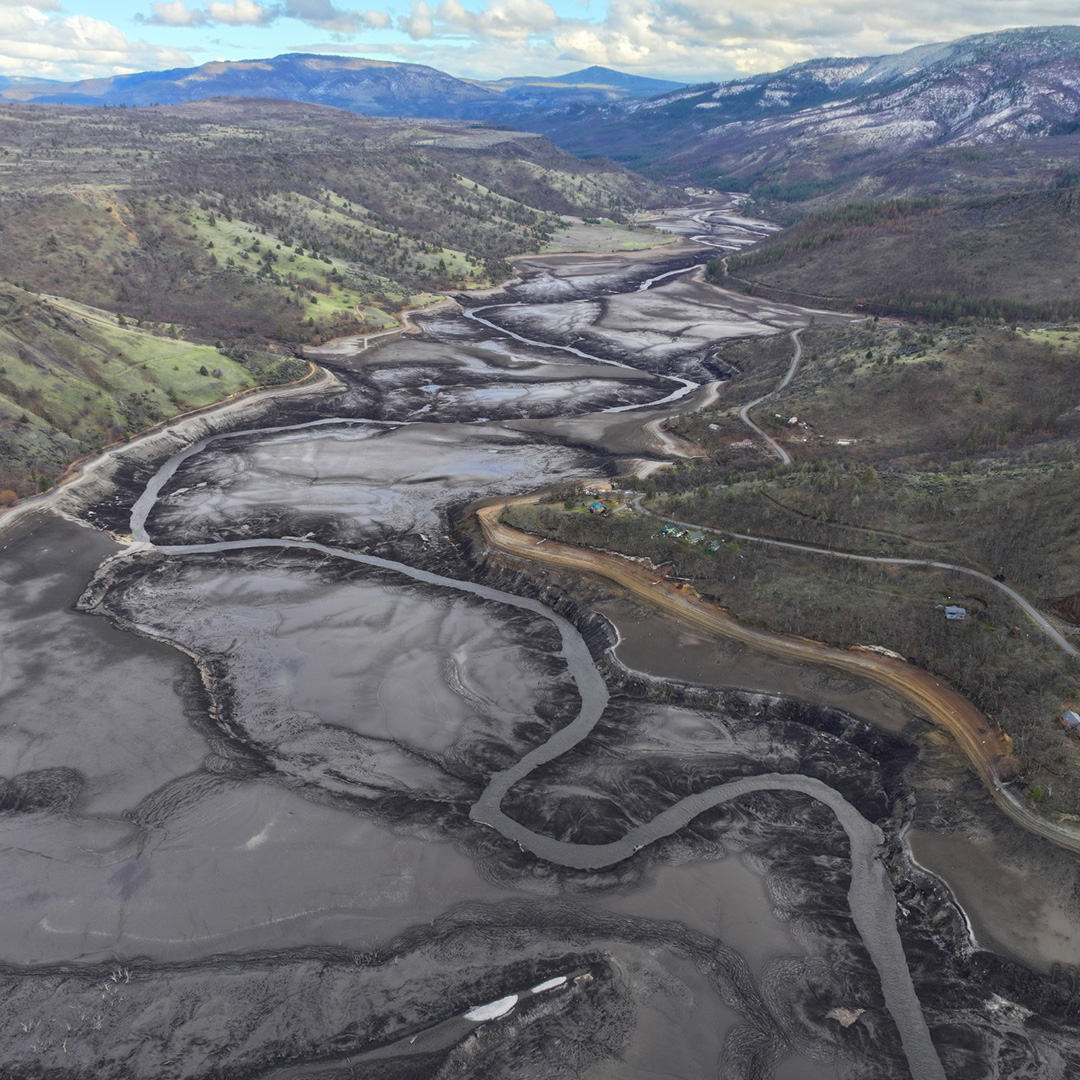
The Klamath River flowing through the depression left by Copco Lake in March 2024, drained that spring prior to the demolition of the Copco 1 Dam (visible at top).

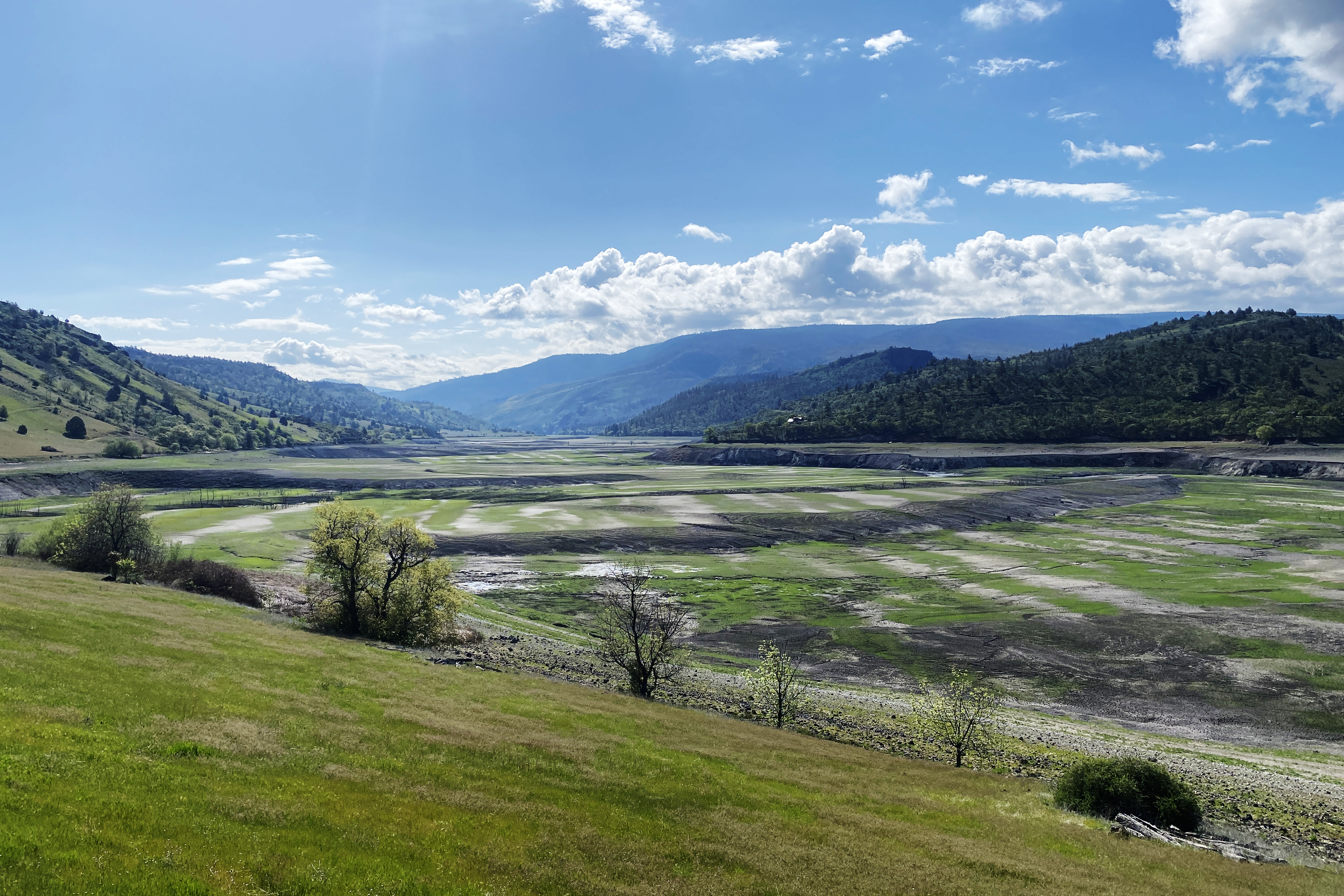
New vegetation growth at the same location (July 2024)

In 2010, the Klamath Basin Restoration Agreement was signed by nearly 50 parties including farmers, tribes, fishermen, conservation groups, and government agencies. This established a framework to address future water rights disputes in the Klamath Basin, and called for the removal of the four lower dams of the Klamath Hydroelectric Project (J.C. Boyle, Copco #1, Copco #2 and Iron Gate). The Link River and Keno Dams, which have fish ladders, would remain. In 2013, the U.S. Department of the Interior released its final environmental impact statement on the plan. The Klamath Hydroelectric Settlement Agreement was enacted in 2016, outlining the regulatory procedures needed to remove the dams, increase flows for fisheries, maintain irrigation water and power supply, reintroduce salmon to the Upper Klamath Basin, restore habitat impacted by the dams, and provide economic assistance to counties, tribes and residents impacted by dam removal.

In 2020, the states of California and Oregon, the Yurok and Karuk Tribes, PacifiCorp, and the newly created Klamath River Renewal Corporation (KRRC) signed a final Memorandum of Agreement to implement the project. This formally requested the federal government to transfer the dams' licenses to KRRC, which would oversee the removal with Kiewit Construction as the primary contractor. The project's $450 million cost would be borne mostly by PacifiCorp customers and the state of California, with Oregon contributing only to contingency funding.

The first dam to be removed was Copco No. 2 in October 2023. The reservoirs behind Iron Gate, Copco No. 1 and J.C. Boyle dams were drained in January–March 2024, and the dams themselves were demolished by August 2024. This represents the largest dam removal project conducted in the US to date. During and immediately after the removal process, the river experienced a temporary drop in water quality and increase in turbidity as accumulated sediments behind the dams were flushed out. In March 2024, a large die-off of hatchery Chinook salmon occurred when they were released upstream of Iron Gate Dam. The fish are believed to have succumbed to gas bubble disease when they passed through the temporary diversion tunnel used to drain Iron Gate reservoir; water flowing through the tunnel had a much greater level of turbulence than expected.

Restoration work was already ongoing prior to and during dam removal, and is planned to continue for several years afterward. Restoration is being conducted by Resource Environmental Solutions (RES) under the direction of KRRC. This involves revegetating 2,200 acres (890 ha) of newly exposed land in drained reservoirs, stabilizing sediment to prevent erosion, restoring the river's main channel as well as 3.4 miles (5.5 km) of tributaries within the reservoir zones to improve fish passage, and monitoring water quality all the way to the river's mouth. On October 17, 2024, the first fall-run Chinook salmon was observed in the Upper Klamath Basin in Oregon.

In 2025, the numbers of fish returning to the Upper Klamath Basin jumped, with the California Department of Fish and Wildlife reporting salmon reoccupying nearly every corner of their historical habitat. For the first time in over 100 years, tagged Chinook were spotted at the confluence of the Sprague River and Williamson River, above Upper Klamath Lake.

== Recreation ==
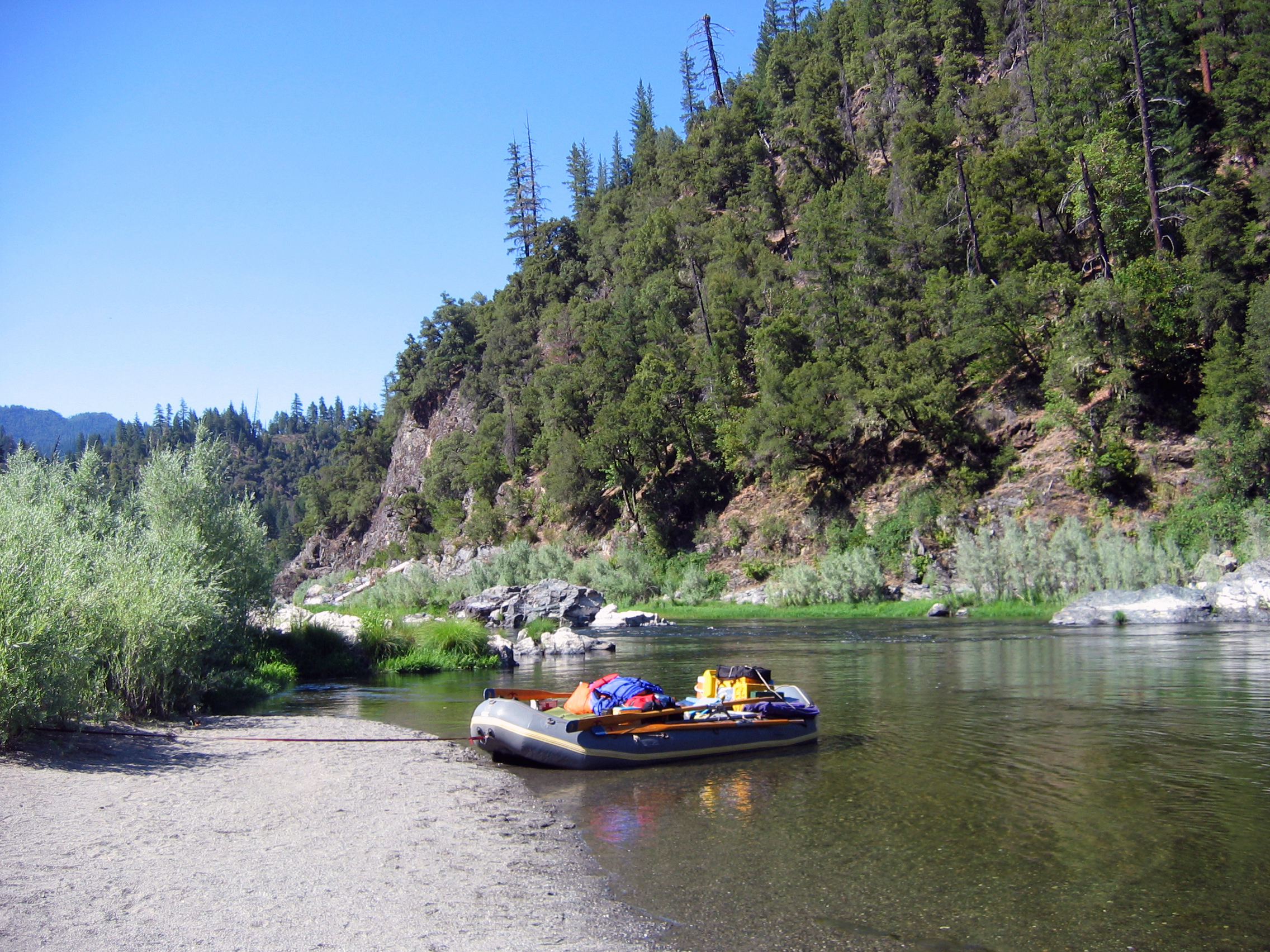
Rafting the Klamath (2005)

Whitewater rafting and kayaking are popular recreational activities along the upper Klamath River, and also along the lower Klamath River downstream of the town of Happy Camp. There are long stretches—over 100 miles (160 km) in one instance—of Class I–II whitewater rapids, while there are some Class III–IV rapids in some of the narrower stretches. After the dam removal, a number of new rapids have become available. Beyond Weitchpec, the river slows down into a wider, deeper channel. About 13 miles (21 km) of the river is designated Wild, and 175 miles (282 km) Recreational.

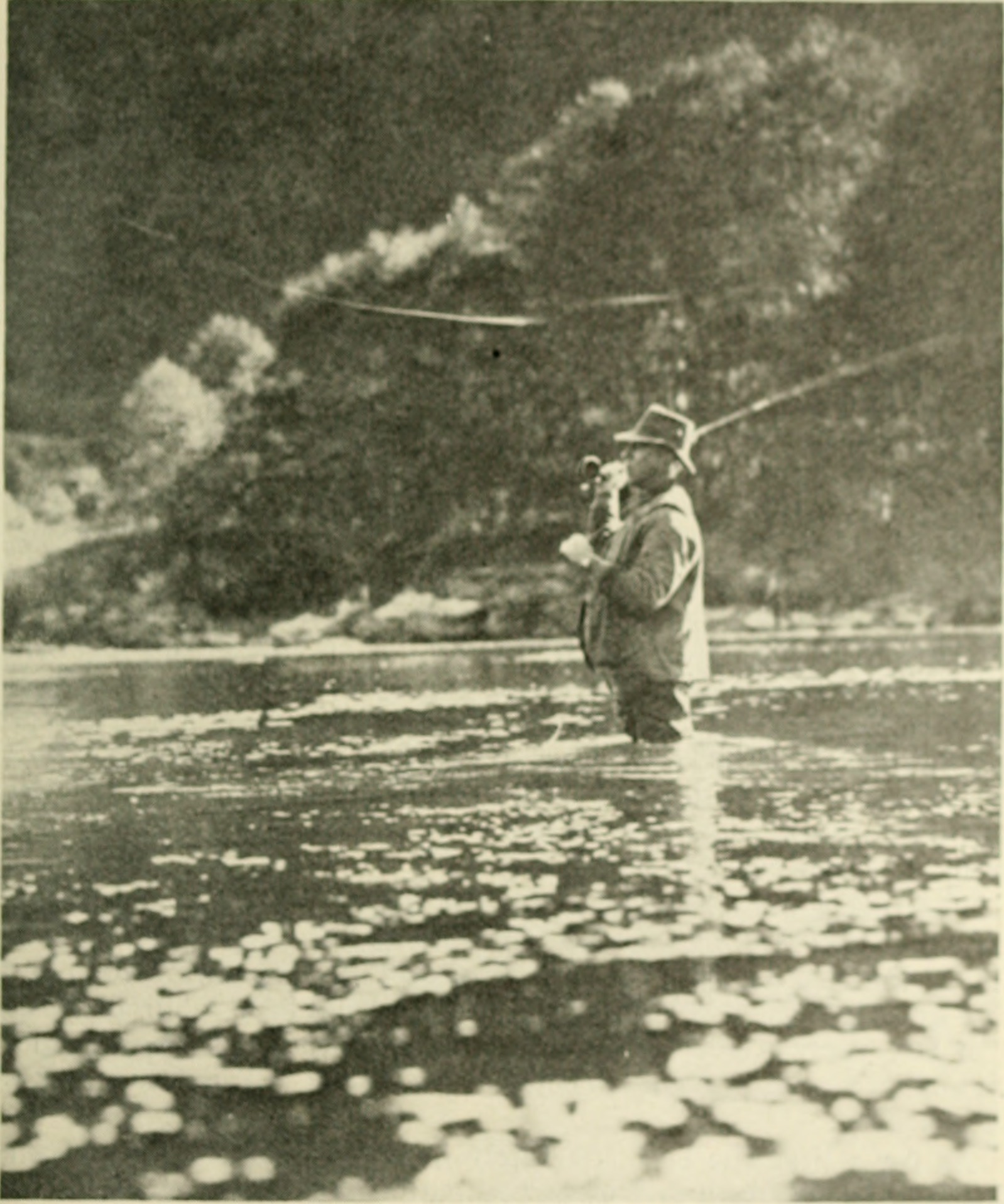
Fly fishing the Klamath River (1932)

Sport fishing is also popular on the Klamath River, with steelhead trout being the most popular, though Chinook salmon are also highly sought after when low salmon returns do not prevent fishing. A fly fishing guide said that the Klamath was one of the most productive steelhead rivers on the West Coast of the United States.

Recreational gold mining is popular along the Klamath and some of its tributaries, including the Salmon and the Trinity. Although simple methods such as panning are still used, some methods use suction pumps—a practice involving turning over deposits of sediment and spreading them in order to find gold. Debates over the practice, which opponents contend damage water quality (mercury) and fish habitat, continue. Since at least 2016, suction dredge mining is banned in California.

== See also ==
- List of California rivers
- List of longest streams of Oregon
- List of National Wild and Scenic Rivers
- List of rivers of Oregon
