= Un-Dam the Klamath =

American social movement

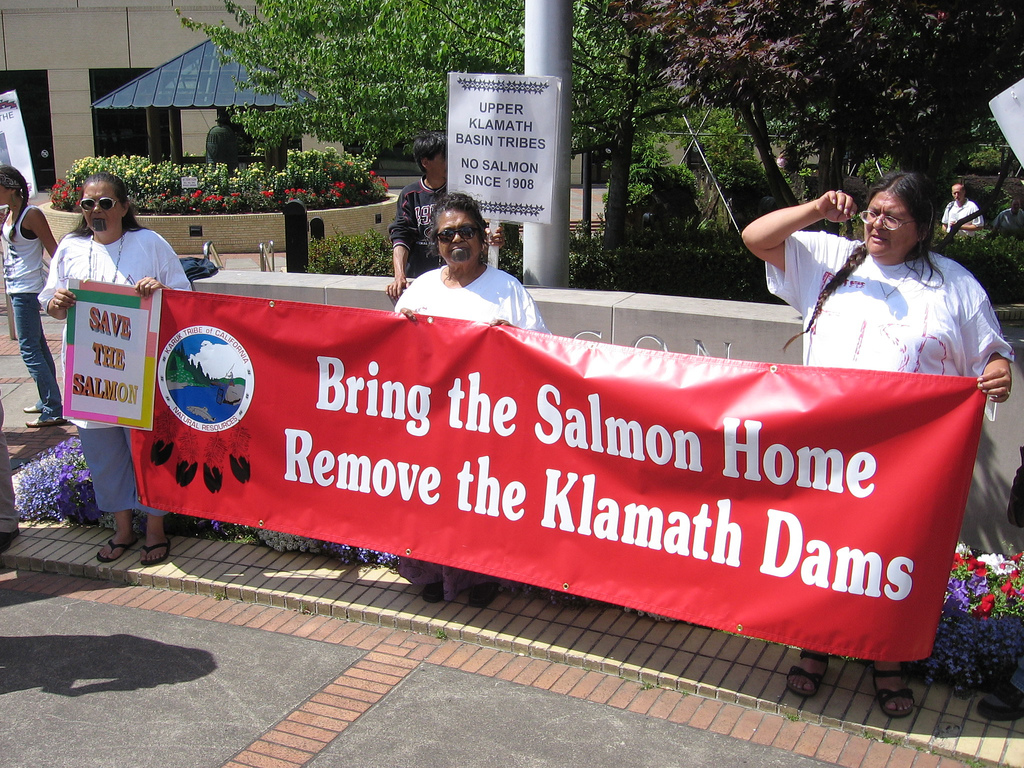
Demonstrators calling for removal of dams on the Klamath River in Oregon and California, U.S. (2006)

Un-Dam the Klamath (#UnDamtheKlamath) was a social movement in the United States to remove the dams on the lower Klamath River primarily because they obstruct salmon, steelhead, and other species of fish from accessing the upper basin which provides hundreds of miles of spawning habitat. The dams have also significantly harmed Native American communities such as the Hupa, Karuk, Klamath, and Yurok. Four hydroelectric dams on the Klamath River in California and Oregon (Copco #1, Copco #2, Iron Gate and J.C. Boyle) were targeted for removal.

The movement to remove the dams gained national attention following the 2002 Klamath River fish kill, when at least 33,000 salmon and steelhead died along the banks of the Klamath upon returning to the river and failing to reach their spawning grounds in the upper basin. The movement argued that the dams should be removed because they create toxic algal blooms, dwindle salmon numbers and create illness in the fish, threaten tribal subsistence and increase health risks for tribal members, and harm the West Coast fishing industry. Seven species of fish are threatened by the dams. The dam removal has also been cited as economically beneficial.

Opposition groups included local landowners around the reservoirs created by the dams and companies like PacifiCorp. PacifiCorp initially agreed to dam removal in 2009, yet after a decade of negotiations pulled out of the agreement when the Federal Energy Regulatory Commission (FERC) stated that they should take responsibility and pay for the removal, rather than simply walk away, as had been agreed upon by all parties. Support groups claimed environmental racism and classism as reasons stalling the dam's removal. The Copco #2 dam was removed in 2023, and the Iron Gate Dam began demolition in May 2024. The final dam was fully removed in October 2024. It currently holds the record for the largest dam removal project in the world, and restored access for fish to their historical cold-water habitat.

After the Klamath River dams were removed in October 2024, researchers have monitored the river to see the changes in the river's ecology, salmon populations and the effects it has had on local Indigenous populations. Many studies have predicted that there will be improvements in water quality which include lower temperatures, increased river flow and enhanced nutrient cycling. Since the removal, there has been an increase in the amount of salmon passing through the new territory and spawning has been seen in rivers in the upper basin of the river. Lastly, the removal of the Klamath River dams has greatly increased the mental health and wellbeing of local indigenous groups.

== Background ==
The Hupa, Karuk, Klamath, and Yurok have fished along the Klamath for thousands of years.

In 1906, the first canal of the Klamath Irrigation Project in the Upper Klamath Basin was completed. By the 1930s, the irrigation project had resulted in near total extinction of salmon in the upper basin. As a result, commercial fishing and Yurok tribal members were banned from fishing.

Construction of Copco #1 dam for hydroelectric power began in 1918. The dam did not divert river water for irrigation but did prevent anadromous fish from passing that section of the river. Copco #2 dam was completed in 1925, resulting in the dewatering of 1.7 miles of historic river channel in Ward's Canyon. The construction of two more hydroelectric dams, (J.C. Boyle in 1958 and Iron Gate in 1964) further reduced accessible fish habitat on the Klamath river, further degrading Indigenous lifeways and culture. Ron Reed, a member of the mid-Klamath Karuk Tribe, recalled that the river was the source of fish and other foods for his family into the 1960s, when the final dam, Iron Gate, was completed.

In 1978, the Supreme Court of California upheld the ban on fishing for tribes. The Yurok had been fighting to regain their rights to fish since the 1930s. This decision sparked protests from the tribe and repression from federal agents and police between 1978 and 1979. At times, violence was used against tribal members. In one instance, Yurok were hosting a birthday near the river "when agents arrived and pulled out their billy clubs." In 1979, the Supreme Court upheld a 1974 decision "that the tribes were entitled to 50 percent of harvestable salmon and that they should become co-managers of state fisheries," which brought an end to the conflict. In the 1980s, because of excessive logging practices by settlers, game, acorns and many other foods were depleted or destroyed.

The dams increasingly led to a decline in Indigenous fisheries, meaning that "Native families increasingly filled their bellies with store-bought and government commodity foods—cheap starches, fats and sugar. Chronic unemployment, despair and addictions rose in the gap left by the vanishing life in the river," as stated by Diana Hartel, who documents how settler presence and the dams have been destructive to Indigenous health through the "collapse of First Nations fisheries [which] had brought deepening poverty and with it soaring rates of diabetes." Hartel argues that because of the ways in which settlers are "disconnected from life rhythms millions of years old... we can wreak havoc on everything around us."

In the summer of 2025 a group of teenage members of the local indigenous people made a 30-day, 300 mile journey, the first canoe decent of the full river in over 100 years. Supported by the international NGO Rios to Rivers, they trained for about two years whitewater canoeing before putting in at the headwaters. The last three days they were accompanied by representatives from indigenous people around the world who are fighting for the life and freedom of their own rivers from New Zealand, to Chile and China, before reaching the Pacific Ocean in a healing ceremony.

== History ==
The remaining water left in the river, whatever the Project is willing to release from Iron Gate Dam, is so little in volume, so hot and so laced with pesticides and nitrates from agricultural waste water that it is often fatal for salmon as much as 100 miles (160 km) downriver. Hundreds of thousands of salmon have been killed in recent years as a result, and Klamath River coho salmon driven nearly to extinction.

— Pacific Coast Federation of Fishermen's Associations (2008)

=== Relicensing ===
The 2002 Klamath River fish kill, in which at least 33,000 fish were killed (some estimates say that it was over 70,000 fish), was important in generating support for dam removal and stopping corporate efforts to relicense the dams. As stated by Craig Tucker, consultant for the Karuk tribe, "the fish kill of '02 was sort of the same time the licenses to operate the dams expired... The fish kill sort of put an exclamation point on the need for removing the dams." The U.S. Fish and Wildlife Service attributed water diversions, approved by then Vice President Dick Cheney, to farmers and ranchers in the Klamath Basin to the fish kill. Cheney was subsequently investigated by the House Natural Resources Committee for his role in causing the fish kill.

In 2005, PacifiCorp applied for relicense to the federal government for the four hydroelectric dams on the Klamath, which would have extended the license for 50 years. Environmentalists, tribal groups, and other supporters stood in opposition to the relicensing.

Early appeals to Warren Buffett by movement groups to stop the relicense were denied. In one instance, after traveling to Buffett's headquarters in Omaha, Nebraska, few were allowed in to address Buffett. One of them was Merv George Jr. (Hupa), who would later become the Rogue River-Siskiyou National Forest Supervisor, along with wife, Wendy. Wendy spoke to an image of Buffett through theater-sized conference screens and stated: "Sir, I have heard you are kind. The dams are killing the fish and destroying my people's way of life." Buffet asked if she had finished, and then, as described by Diana Hartel, "explained utility company politics as if to a child." Forbes Magazine reportedly "wondered how he could be so heartless."

At an October 2008 meeting of the California State Water Resources Control Board, it was noted that "Coho, chinook, steelhead, Pacific lamprey and green sturgeon could disappear from the watershed forever" if the dams were to stay up. Hartel admits that opposition groups refused to listen to Indigenous peoples and movement groups, instead displaying that they were "proud of their place in the West and sadly ignorant of the plight of the tribes on the river." In a reflection published in 2011, Hartel, who is related to people within the opposition movement, states that "their arguments had a lot to do with settler pride of place, how we took this wild river and made it useful—building cheap hydropower, irrigating onions, growing potatoes for Frito-Lay, watering livestock."

The process of re-licensing the dams by PacifiCorp was terminated in 2009, after it determined that "the dams were too expensive to fix."

=== Negotiations ===
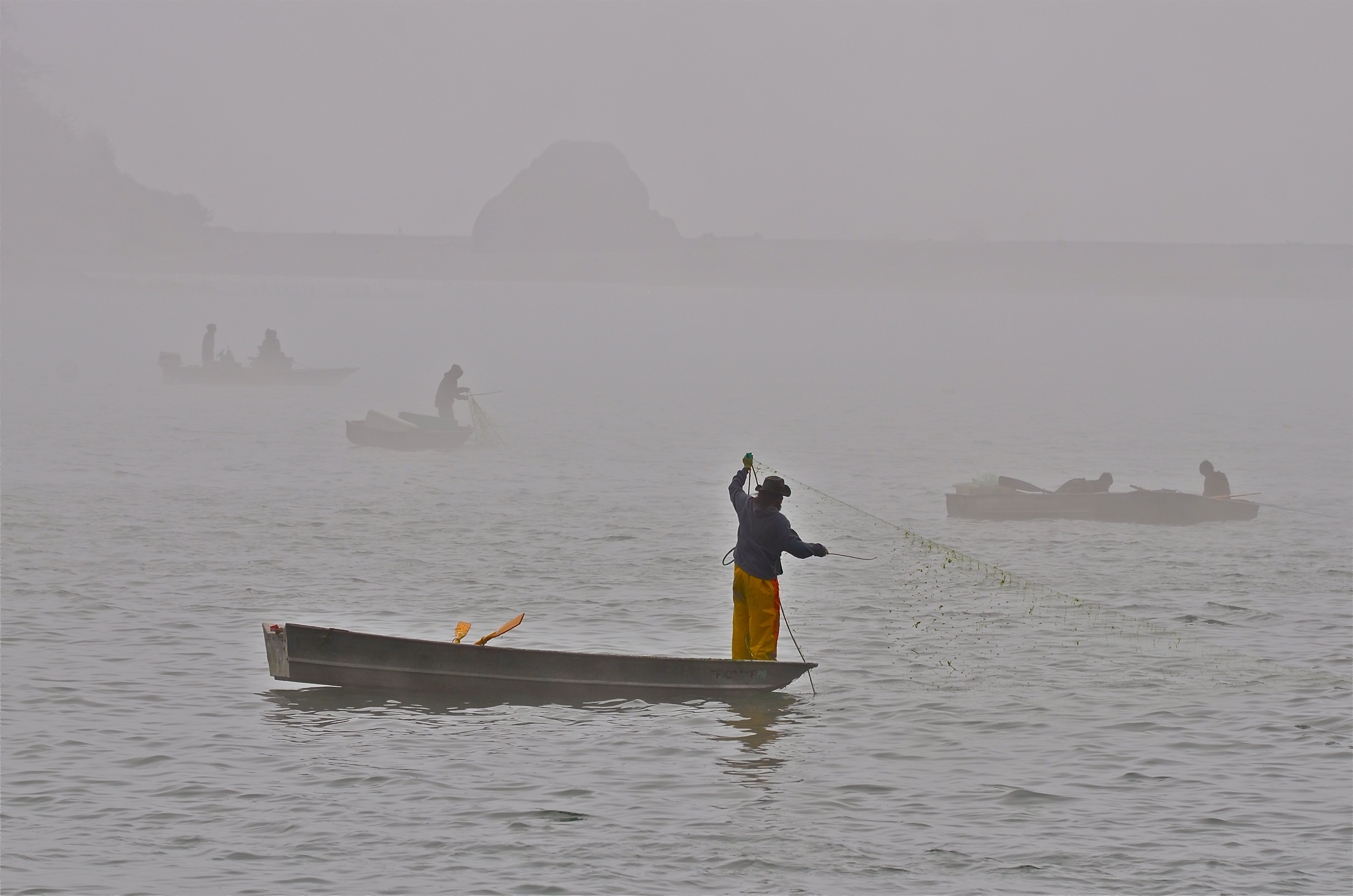
Yurok fishermen on the Klamath River (2011)

On February 19, 2010, the Klamath Basin Restoration Agreement (KBRA) was signed by multiple parties, including Ken Salazar, PacifiCorp representatives, Oregon and California state governors and settlement representatives.

On April 4, 2013, the U.S. Department of the Interior released a final environmental impact statement and recommended the removal the four dams. $1 billion in other environmental restoration would be allocated to aid native salmon runs on the Klamath. Ron Wyden, the senior U.S. senator from Oregon, introduced the Klamath Basin Water Recovery and Economic Restoration Act of 2014, which was cosponsored by fellow Oregon senator Jeff Merkley and by Nevada senator Dean Heller.

On February 8, 2017, a federal district court judge ruled in favor of removing the dams and agreed to a plan created by tribal scientists which would reduce outbreaks of disease among fish which had reportedly infected 90% of juvenile salmon between 2014 and 2015.

The U.S. Congress failed to pass legislation which would have implemented the KBRA by the January 1, 2016 deadline, which meant that a new agreement would have to be negotiated. As a result, the Klamath Hydroelectric Settlement Agreement (KHSA) was negotiated and signed on April 6, 2016. The amended agreement led to the creation of the Klamath River Renewal Corporation (KRRC), which would now apply for complete license transfer from PacifiCorp.

In April 2020, the California Water Board approved two key permits for removing the four large aging hydropower dams on the Klamath River. The board came to this conclusion "based on evidence that dam removal would improve drinking water quality by reducing algal blooms, and would restore habitat for endangered salmon and other organisms that rely on free-flowing rivers." However, even with this approval, the project still required approval from the Federal Energy Regulatory Commission (FERC).

On July 17, 2020, FERC stated that PacifiCorp would have to stay on the license during the removal process, rather than just walk away (as previously agreed to by both KRRC and PacifiCorp), "and take responsibility for cost overruns." As a result, PacifiCorp withdrew from the agreement and the dam removal process slowed once again.

On October 22, 2020, the movement was covered in a video story for Vice News. In the video, it was reported that "after a decade of negotiations, the [Yurok] tribe is starting to wonder if it will ever really happen." Salmon runs were reportedly the lowest they had ever been and Yurok tribal members explained that the salmon could not be sustained much longer.

As of February 25, 2022, FERC released their final Environmental Impact Statement (EIS). One of the four dams was removed in 2023 and the rest were expected to be removed sometime in 2024.

January 2024 marked a major milestone when work crews started to release water that had been held back for the first time in a century. Starting with the Iron Gate Dam, 3 dams were decommissioned and removed over the next year.

=== Restoring the habitat ===
Nearly $70 million will be made available for the Klamath Basin Restoration project through the Bipartisan Infrastructure Law, with investments totalling $162 million over five years in work restoring the regional ecosystem and repairing local economies. In the largest river restoration in U.S. history, contractor Resource Environmental Solutions (RES) and area tribes will plant up to 19 billion seeds. Shrubs and trees that will be planted include Klamath plum, buckbrush, serviceberry and Oregon ash. The design of the planting has included 96 different species, including yampah, lomatium, mugwort and Asclepias, as well as tens of thousands of oak. The targets are to plant 250,000 trees and shrubs and more than 13 billion seeds and perhaps as many as 17 to 19 billion. Included within the plan is the eradication of non-native species such as medusahead and Himalayan blackberry vines.

The Klamath Integrated Fish plan will combine restoration and monitoring by the United States Fish and Wildlife Service, the Pacific States Marine Fisheries Commission and ESSA Technologies with over 100 other participatory organisations. Native fish species that will be particularly focused on include: chinook salmon and coho salmon, steelhead, bull trout, redband trout, Pacific lamprey, Lost river sucker (C'waam), shortnose sucker (Koptu), green sturgeon and eulachon. Director of the Yurok fisheries Barry McCovey said that he guessed the recovery might last longer than he will be alive, but the "tribes' long efforts are for their grandchildren and generations to come."

Salmon are particularly important to the Yurok tribe as part of their arts. "Salmon always gave us the physical and mental strength to carry out these arts" said Tori McConnell, the 2023 Miss Indian World. She explained that the local environment is very special and that her spirit is part of the water, rocks, willow, salmon, deer and "the way that the air smells or the way it feels when you're up on a mountain".

On October 3, 2024, the first salmon was seen by sonar moving past the former dam sites to Oregon since the dams were built.

=== Artistic depiction ===
Lucy Raven created a moving image installation called Murderers Bar (2025), showing the undamming and the consequent rush of water to the Pacific Ocean, using both aerial film and lidar/sonar generated animation. The piece combines sculpture, moving image, and ecological narratives.

== After dam removal ==
The four Klamath River dams were removed by October 2, 2024, ending the largest dam removal and river restoration project in United States history. Deconstruction started in 2023 with Copco No. 3 and ended with the removal of Copco No. 1, Iron Gate, and J.C. Boyle. Removing these dams opened up 400 miles of river habitat for salmon populations. Since October, the Klamath River has seen dramatic changes in its ecology, habitat health, and the species that occupy it. Furthermore, communities surrounding the Klamath River basin have also experienced a shift in lifestyle patterns since the dam removals.

The 2026 study "Deconstructing dams and disease: predictions for salmon disease risk following Klamath River dam removals" predicts that removing the Klamath River dams will improve the ecological properties of the Klamath River. More specifically, improved water qualities such as lower temperatures, increased nutrient cycling, and faster flow rate are expected to occur. However, the construction required to remove the dams is predicted to cause a dramatic, short-term, increase in sediment levels, which may harm animal populations. As for the fish populations, if the basin becomes more self-sustaining and dynamic, they could experience different migration and growth patterns. Most of these predictions are positive, as salmon will have more space to lay their eggs, migrate, and spawn throughout the river. On the other hand, physical changes in the river environment and access to new river habitat could increase the risk of disease spreading among salmon populations.

=== Impacts on salmon populations ===
The 2002 Klamath River fish kill is widely cited as a key event leading to dam removal efforts. Low water flows, elevated water temperatures, and disease outbreaks (including White Spot Disease and Columnaris) contributed to the death of more than 65,000 adult Chinook salmon. Initial estimates reported approximately 34,000 fish; subsequent analysis by the U.S. Fish and Wildlife Service revised the estimate upward. The event affected the Yurok Tribe, for whom Chinook salmon are an important subsistence and cultural resource, and resulted in economic losses to the Northern California fishing industry.

One year after the completion of the dam removals, salmon populations have been increasing rapidly. Scientists for CalTrout used a sonar fish tracking system to count the amount of fish that were passing through the newly accessible river habitat. In fall 2025, they found that more than 10,000 fish (likely Chinook salmon due to their size) passed through what would have been the Iron Gate dam site. Compared to last year's fish run, this is a 30% increase in the number of fish of the same size. Since salmon and other fish populations have 400+ miles of newly accessible river habitat, they were found to be spawning in the Wood, Sprague, and Williamson Rivers around the Upper Klamath Lake.

Furthermore, the overall health of the river has improved as well. Previously, the dams caused unnaturally warm water temperatures, which caused algal blooms and lower habitat quality for fish populations. Ongoing monitoring of the river has shown that water temperatures have returned to natural temperatures. Another sign that the river's health is improving is water quality. There has been a significant decrease in harmful algal blooms and an increase in dissolved oxygen levels.

=== Indigenous group's reconnection ===
Since the construction of the Klamath River dams in 1918, Karuk tribal members have been on the forefront for exposing the dam's negative impacts on Native communities. Although cultural ties and spiritual connection to the river is important, the biggest concern expressed by the Karuk tribe was food security. Prior to the construction of dams, Native people's diet consisted of 450 pounds of salmon a year. Once they lost access to this resource, there was an epidemic of health struggles, mainly as diabetes, among these communities. Furthermore, losing access to salmon took a toll on Native people's mental health significantly. Due to how these issues disproportionately impact Native populations, the Klamath River dams are also considered an environmental justice issue.

A 2026 social impact assessment conducted mass surveys about how the dam removals have impacted Indigenous community's well-being and experiences. The researchers observed five different factors of well-being: health of the Klamath river, access to cultural resources, livelihoods, education, and self-governance. They found that before the dam removal, a large proportion of Indigenous people felt that the Klamath River was unhealthy and, in turn, negatively impacting their cultural ties to the river, with 54% of respondents claiming that they use the river for community outings. After the removal of the four dams, there has been a positive change in the way these communities view the river. Now, 67% of Indigenous respondents feel that they have sufficient access to the Klamath River with 62% saying that the dam removal has improved their mental health.
