= Klamath River Hydroelectric Project =

Former infrastructure project in California

The Klamath River Hydroelectric Project was a series of hydroelectric dams and other facilities on the mainstem of the Klamath River, in a watershed on both sides of the California-Oregon border.

The infrastructure was constructed between 1903 and 1962, the first elements engineered and built by the California Oregon Power Company ("Copco"). That company merged into Pacific Power and Light in 1961, and is now the energy company PacifiCorp. PacifiCorp continues to operate the project for profit, producing a maximum of 169 MW from seven generating stations. The company owns all but one of the dams.

In 2016, four of the project's dams were scheduled for removal by the year 2020, pending approval by the governing Federal Energy Regulatory Commission. A fifth ran at reduced output, facing eventual decommissioning. All dams were removed by August 2024.

The project can be distinguished from the Klamath Project which is a set of United States Bureau of Reclamation (USBR) dams on upstream tributaries of the Klamath, operated primarily for agricultural water storage. The Link River Dam belongs to both.

== Inventory ==
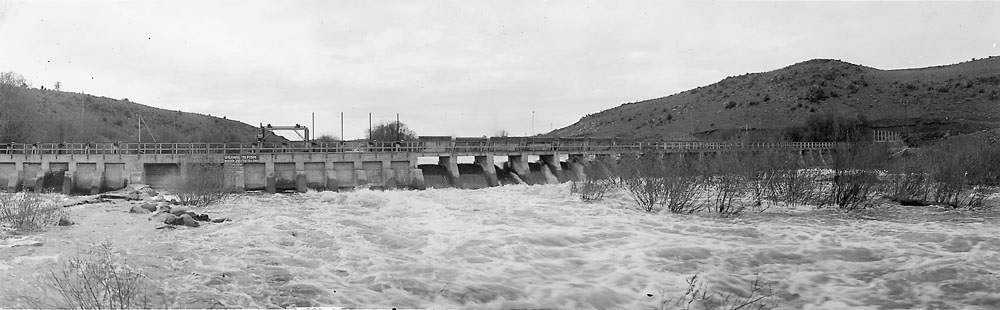
Link River Dam, May 1938

PacifiCorp owned all project dams, except for Link River Dam, which was owned by the U.S. Bureau of Reclamation. All dams were on the mainstem of the Klamath, except for Fall Creek Dam, on a tributary. The project's dams included:

- The Fall Creek Dam, located north of Copco Dam #2 on a close tributary of the Klamath, was built for hydropower generation by the Siskiyou Electric Power Company and operational by 1903.
- The Copco Dam #1 (completed 1912–16, expanded 1922) and #2 (completed 1922–1925), both for hydropower generation. Copco Dam #1 impounded Copco Lake.
- The Link River Dam, completed in 1921 primarily for flood control and water storage, with secondary hydropower generation. It impounds Upper Klamath Lake. Link River is owned by the U.S. Bureau of Reclamation.
- The John C. Boyle Dam, completed in 1958 for hydroelectric power, impounded the John C. Boyle Reservoir.
- The Iron Gate Dam, completed in 1964 for hydropower, was the furthest-downstream and tallest dam in the system.
- Keno Dam, a non-generating dam impounding Lake Ewauna, was built in 1967 to replace the wooden Needle Dam.

== Dam removal ==
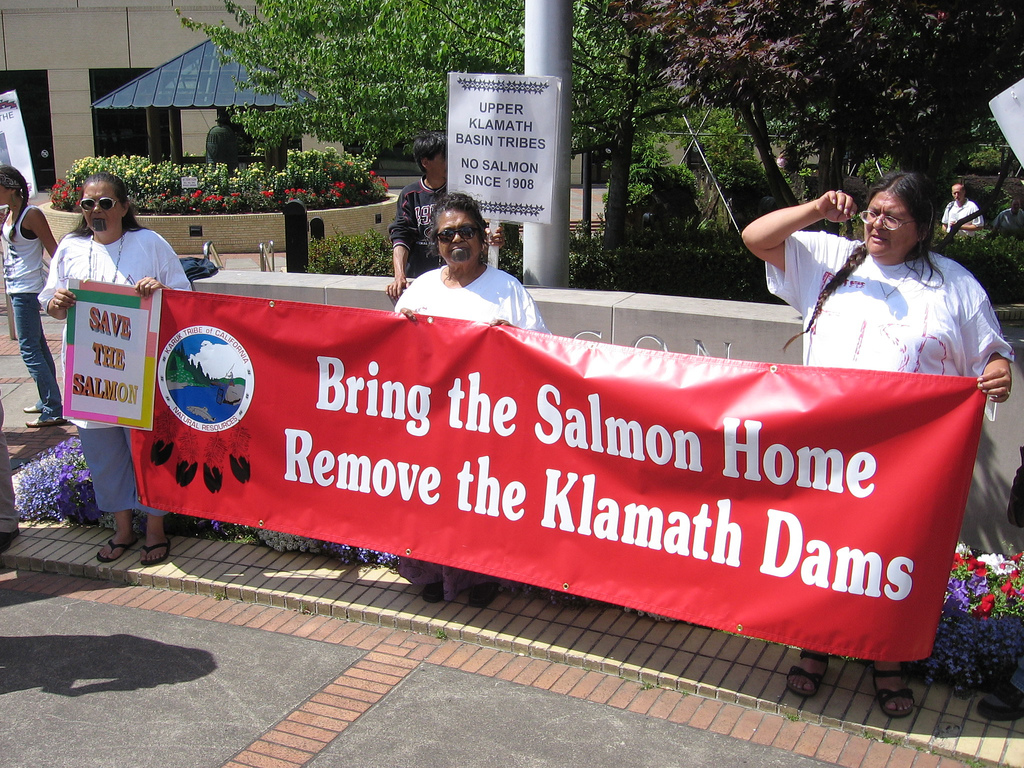
Demonstrators calling for removal of dams on the Klamath River in Oregon and California, USA

As resolution of several long-range issues centered on water rights in the Klamath Basin, the multi-party Klamath Basin Restoration Agreement was signed in early 2008. Parties to the agreement included the state of California, the state of Oregon, three Native American tribes, four counties, and 35 other local organizations and individuals.

At the time PacifiCorp faced a relicensing cycle with Federal Energy Regulatory Commission, with potentially expensive fixes for salmon passage and to address the growth of the toxic bacteria Microcystis aeruginosa in the Copco and Iron Gate Reservoirs.

On September 29, 2009, Pacificorp reached an agreement in principle with the other KBRA parties to remove the John C. Boyle Dam, the Iron Gate Dam, and Copco #1 and #2, pending Congressional approval.

Congress did not act, so as of February 2016, the states of Oregon and California, the dam owners, federal regulators and other parties reached a further agreement to remove those four dams by the year 2020, contingent only on approval by the Federal Energy Regulatory Commission. The new plan has been endorsed by the governors of California and Oregon. Dam removal was endorsed by U.S. Secretary of the Interior Sally Jewell in 2016, though that endorsement was later rescinded by U.S. Secretary of the Interior David Bernhardt in 2019.

The Copco #2 dam was removed in 2023, and the Iron Gate Dam began demolition in May 2024. The final dam was removed in August 2024.
