= John C. Boyle Reservoir =

Former water reservoir in Oregon, USA

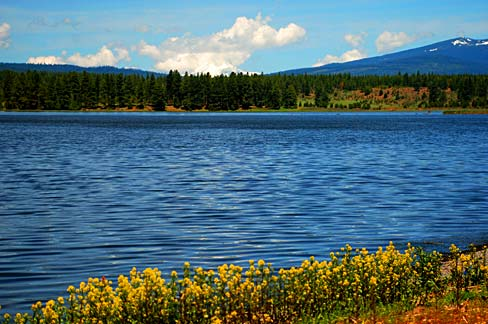
- Boyle Reservoir

- Location within Oregon Location within the United States
- Location: Klamath County, Oregon
- Coordinates: 42°08′24″N 122°02′01″W
- Type: Reservoir, eutrophic
- Primary inflows: Klamath River
- Primary outflows: Klamath River
- Catchment area: 4,080 square miles (10,600 km^{2})
- Basin countries: United States
- Surface area: 381 acres (154 ha)
- Average depth: 11 feet (3.4 m)
- Max. depth: 45 feet (14 m)
- Water volume: 4,200 acre-feet (5,200,000 m^{3})
- Residence time: < 1 week
- Shore length^{1}: 7.6 miles (12.2 km)
- Surface elevation: 3,796 feet (1,157 m)
- Settlements: Keno, Klamath Falls
- ^{1} Shore length is not a well-defined measure.

John C. Boyle Reservoir was an artificial impoundment behind John C. Boyle Dam on the Klamath River in the U.S. state of Oregon. The lake was 16 miles (26 km) west-southwest of Klamath Falls along Oregon Route 66.

The dam stood at about river mile (RM) 225 or river kilometer (RK) 362, about 10 miles (16 km) by river downstream of the community of Keno. Spencer Bridge carried the highway over the lake at about its midpoint.

Water from the reservoir was diverted through a sluice to the Boyle Powerhouse, about 5 miles (8 km) downstream of the dam. Fluctuations of up to 3 feet (0.9 m) daily in the reservoir level occurred as water was added for storage or diverted for power generation.

== History ==
The California–Oregon Power Company (COPCO), which later merged with Pacific Power, a future subsidiary of PacifiCorp, built the dam in the mid-1950s as part of the multi-dam Klamath River Hydroelectric Project. Meant primarily to generate hydroelectricity, the reservoir can hold up to 4,200 acre-feet (5,200,000 m^{3}) of water. Originally called Big Bend Reservoir, it was renamed in 1962 for John C. Boyle, COPCO's vice president, general manager, and chief engineer.

The Boyle dam was one of four Klamath River dams to be removed in the 2020s. The other three, all owned by PacifiCorp and all in California, were Iron Gate, Copco 2, and Copco 1. A tentative agreement reached in 2009 by major stakeholders, including PacifiCorp, would remove the dams to restore salmon runs blocked below Iron Gate for about a century. As of February 25, 2022, the FERC released their final Environmental Impact Statement (EIS) on the dam's removal. The dam was finally removed in 2024.

It is named after John C. Boyle (1899–1979), who was vice president, general manager, and long-time chief engineer of the California Oregon Power Company (COPCO), a privately held utility that served southern Oregon and portions of northern California.

== Recreation ==
The reservoir supported largemouth bass ranging from 12 to 16 inches (30 to 41 cm), which could be fished for by boat or from the bank. Other fish found in the lake included black crappie, white crappie, yellow perch, brown bullhead, and pumpkinseed sunfish.

Topsy Recreation Site, maintained by the Bureau of Land Management, has a campground, a boat launch, a dock, and a fishing pier at J. C. Boyle Reservoir. Swimming, picnicking, and bird-watching are among recreational activities in addition to camping and fishing.

== See also ==
- List of lakes in Oregon
