= California Department of Fish and Wildlife =

Government agency in California

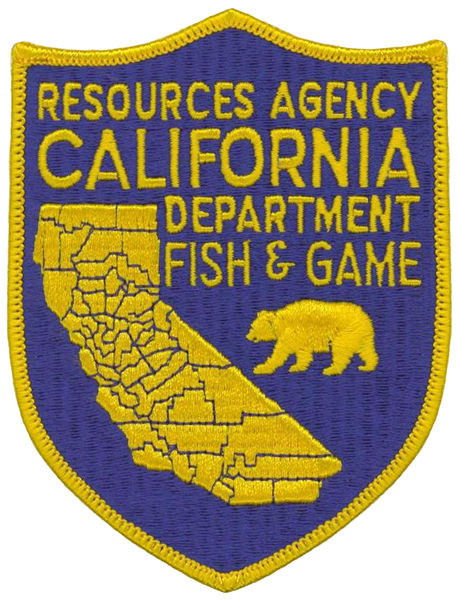
- Patch of the California Department of Fish and Game

Agency overview
- Formed: 1909
- Preceding agency: Board of Fish Commissioners
- Headquarters: 1416 Ninth Street, Sacramento, California
- Annual budget: $539 million (2007)
- Agency executive: Charlton (Chuck) Bonham, Executive Director
- Parent agency: California Resources Agency
- Website: wildlife.ca.gov

Map
- Jurisdiction of the California Department of Fish and Wildlife.

The California Department of Fish and Wildlife (CDFW), formerly known as the California Department of Fish and Game (CDFG), is an American state agency under the California Natural Resources Agency. The Department of Fish and Wildlife manages and protects the state's wildlife, wildflowers, trees, mushrooms, algae (kelp and seaweed) and native habitats (ecosystems). The department is responsible for regulatory enforcement and management of related recreational, commercial, scientific, and educational uses. The department also prevents illegal poaching.

== History ==
The Game Act was passed in 1852 by the California State Legislature and signed into law by Governor John Bigler. The Game Act closed seasons in 12 counties for quail, partridge, mallard and wood ducks, elk, deer, and antelope. A second legislative action enacted the same year protected salmon runs. In 1854, the Legislature extended the act to include all counties of California. In 1860, protection controls were extended for trout. Lake Merritt in Oakland was made the first game refuge of California in 1869, believed to be the first in the United States.

In 1870, the Legislature, with the support of Governor Henry Huntly Haight, created the Board of Fish Commissioners. The Board stipulated that fish ladders were now required at state dams. The Board outlawed explosives or other deleterious substances, and created a $500 fine for violations. In 1870, the first fish ladder in the state was built on a tributary of the Truckee River, and a state hatching house was established at the University of California, Berkeley.

In 1871, the state appointed the first game wardens to handle wildlife law enforcement, making the Enforcement Division of the Department of Fish and Game the first state law enforcement agency enacted in California. Over the next 30 years, the Board of Fish Commissioners were given authority over game in the state as well as establishing hunting and fishing licenses.

In 1909, the Board of Fish Commissioners changed its name to the Fish and Game Commission. The Division of Fish and Game was established in 1927, set up within the Department of Natural Resources. In 1951, the Reorganization Act elevated the Division of Fish and Game to the Department of Fish and Game (DFG).

California Fish and Game also collaborated with the indigenous Native American Tribes to ensure their proper fishing rights. The Yurok tribe has collaborated with them as recently as 2011. The department also helped figure out the official count of fish killed (which was around 30,000) in the 2002 Fish Kill on the Klamath River. The Klamath river is very important to the tribes that live along that river.

By 2012, California was one of only 13 states still using "Game" in the title of their wildlife agency. The State Legislature changed the department's name to Fish and Wildlife on January 1, 2013. The legislation followed recommendations of a 51-member stakeholder advisory group. 18 other states use the term "wildlife," while the others generally use "natural resources" or "conservation," in the titles of their Departments. This change reflects the trend toward expansion of the Agencies' missions from sport fishing and hunting alone, to protection of non-game wildlife and whole ecosystems.

In June 2015, the CDFW phased out lead ammunition for hunting on state land in order to keep lead out of backcountry ecosystems.

== Regional divisions ==
The Department of Fish and Wildlife divides the State of California into seven management regions whose boundaries mostly correspond to county borders (with the exception of Sacramento, Yolo, and San Joaquin counties).

- Northern Region: Del Norte, Humboldt, Lassen, Mendocino, Modoc, Shasta, Siskiyou, Tehama and Trinity counties.
- North Central Region: Alpine, Amador, Butte, Calaveras, Colusa, El Dorado, Glenn, Lake, Nevada, Placer, Plumas, Sacramento, San Joaquin, Sierra, Sutter, Yolo and Yuba counties.
- Bay Delta Region: Alameda, Contra Costa, Marin, Napa, Sacramento, San Mateo, Santa Clara, Santa Cruz, San Francisco, San Joaquin, Solano, Sonoma, and Yolo counties.
- Central Region: Fresno, Kern, Kings, Madera, Mariposa, Merced, Monterey, San Benito, San Luis Obispo, Stanislaus, Tulare and Tuolumne counties.
- South Coast Region: Los Angeles, Orange, San Diego, Santa Barbara and Ventura counties.
- Inland Deserts Region: Imperial, Inyo, Mono, Riverside and San Bernardino counties.
- Marine Region: includes the entire coastline of California.

== Law Enforcement Division ==
The department employs wardens to protect California's wildlife and natural resources. CDFW wardens are armed law enforcement officers with statewide arrest authority. Their primary mission is to enforce California state laws related to hunting, fishing, pollution, endangered species, and wildlife habitat destruction. However, they can enforce any state law, anywhere in the state. Vehicles used range from the patrol pickups to boats, catamarans, four-wheelers, snow-mobiles, horses, helicopters, and planes. The wardens investigate, collect evidence, serve search warrants, arrest criminals, and ensure public safety. Wardens patrol the state of California and 200 miles (320 km) off the coast.

As of 2014, about 380 wardens patrolled the state.

Merging the Law Enforcement Division into the California Highway Patrol has been discussed, similar to how Alaska has a Wildlife Trooper division within the Alaska State Troopers. Given that the CDFW Law Enforcement Division has faced low numbers of wildlife officers for the last ten years.

=== Marine officers ===
The Marine Region officers patrol the entire coastline of California, and up to 200 miles off the shore. Marine officers enforce commercial and sport fishing laws through spot checks on the water and on land. As of 2001, the Marine Region was patrolled by 63 officers piloting 65-foot, 54-foot, and 40-foot mono-hull patrol vessels and 18-foot and 24-foot rigid-hull inflatable patrol boats. Some rigid-hull inflatable boats are carried on the larger patrol vessels, while others are carried on trailers to respond to emergencies on the north coast.

=== Special Operations Unit ===
The Special Operations Unit (SOU) is CDFW's investigative unit. The SOU investigates crimes related to improper use of California's natural resources, including poaching of fish and game. The unit accomplishes this with a combination of physical surveillance and undercover operations.

=== Pilots ===
The CDFW operates an Air Services unit for the purposes of aerial surveillance, fish stocking, and transportation. All CDFW pilots are fully qualified peace officers, pilots, and airplane mechanics. They are responsible for maintaining their own aircraft, and fly out of Hemet, Fresno, Sacramento, and Redding.

== Office of Spill Prevention and Response ==
The Office of Spill Prevention and Response (OSPR) is a branch of the California Department of Fish and Wildlife that is tasked with responding to pollution and protecting the wildlife of California. The OSPR has authority over all surface waters in California, both inland and up to 200 miles (320 km) off the coast. The funding for the OSPR's Oil Spill Prevention Administration Fund comes from a fee placed on every barrel of crude oil entering California.

== Wildlife Forensics Laboratory ==
The CDFW Wildlife Forensics Laboratory is a forensic laboratory that uses molecular biology to investigate crimes against animals. The lab is staffed by three wildlife forensic specialists who help CDFW officers identify species, determine the biological sex of an animal, and determine whether two samples are from the same animal.

== California Fish and Game Commission ==
The California Fish and Game Commission is an organ of the California state government, and is separate from the CDFW. Although the department's name was recently modified by changing the word "Game" to "Wildlife", no such name change has occurred for the commission.

== In popular culture ==
CDFW officers were followed by the National Geographic Channel show "Wild Justice" in 2010 and 2011.

A fictionalized version of the CDFW is depicted in the 2022 film, Jurassic World Dominion. Rangers capture and relocate dinosaurs that escaped into the wild at the end of the previous film.

== See also ==
- List of California Department of Fish and Wildlife protected areas
- List of law enforcement agencies in California
- List of state and territorial fish and wildlife management agencies in the United States
- List of marine protected areas of California
