= Link River Dam =

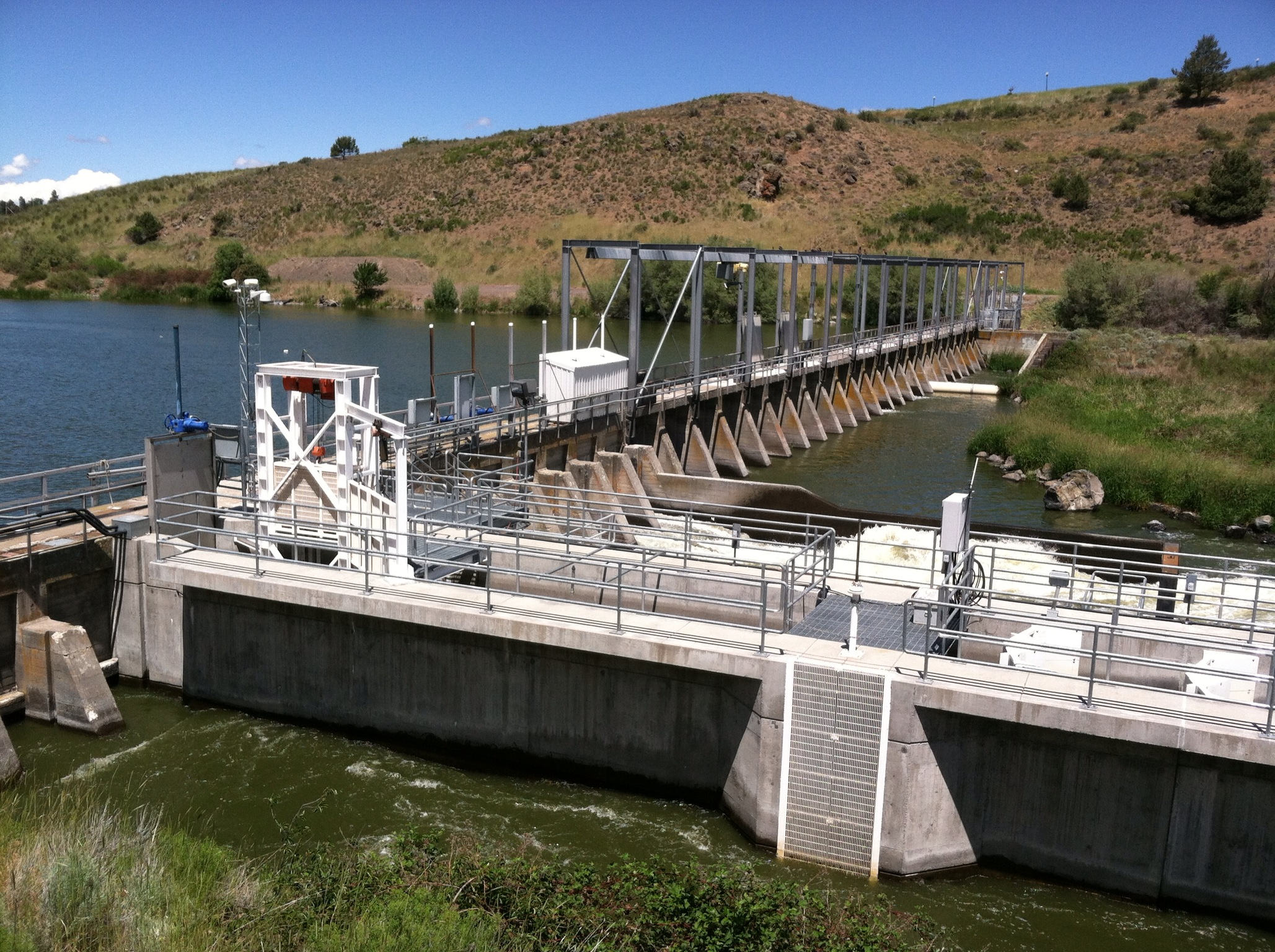
- The Link River Dam complex
- Interactive map of Link River Dam
- Location: Klamath Falls, U.S.
- Coordinates: 42°14′02″N 121°48′07″W
- Construction began: July 29, 1920
- Opening date: October 29, 1921
- Owner: U.S. Bureau of Reclamation

Dam and spillways
- Type of dam: Gravity dam
- Impounds: Link River
- Height: 7 m (23 ft)
- Length: 113 m (371 ft)
- Spillway capacity: 85 m^{3}/s (3,002 cu ft/s)

Reservoir
- Creates: Klamath Lake
- Total capacity: 1.1 km^{3} (890,000 acre⋅ft)
- Maximum water depth: 18 m (59 ft)

Power Station
- Turbines: 2
- Installed capacity: 151 MW

The Link River Dam is a concrete gravity dam on the Link River in the city of Klamath Falls, Oregon, United States. It was built in 1921 by the California Oregon Power Company (COPCO), the predecessor of PacifiCorp, which continues to operate the dam. The dam is owned by the U.S. Bureau of Reclamation.

Link River Dam's reservoir, Klamath Lake, has a capacity of 873,000 acre-feet (1.077×10^{9} m^{3}). The project provides flood control, generates hydro power, and stores most of the water used for irrigation in the Klamath Reclamation Project. The dam is 22 feet (7 m) high and 435 feet (133 m) long.

Its two channels can allow one outflow of 3,000 ft^{3}/s (85 m^{3}/s) with 1,000 ft^{3}/s (28 m^{3}/s) through the Ankeny Canal, and another outflow of 290 ft^{3}/s (8 m^{3}/s) through the Keno Canal. Those channels feed PacifiCorp's two hydroelectric turbines located downstream and generate 151 MW. All the flow is ultimately diverted down the Link River into Lake Ewauna.

In 2004 PacifiCorp announced the Link River power projects would be abandoned, as the cost to repair the canal and pipeline supplying the power turbines is too high to be economically viable. As of 2014 the company intends to continue to run the plant, in the short term and at reduced output.

== History ==
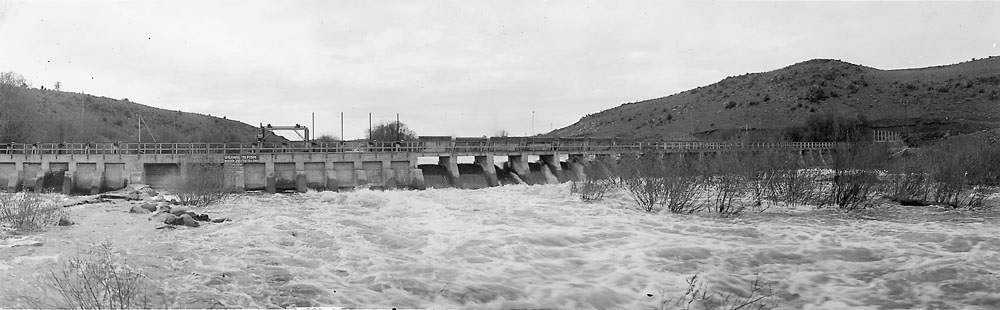
Link River Dam May 1938

In 1878, five years after the Modoc Wars, residents of Linkville formed the "Linkville Water Ditch Company." They dug a low capacity canal that connected their homes with the Link River. A William Steele extended the ditch by 15 miles (24 km) in 1884. After his death in 1888 the Klamath Falls Irrigation Company took over the canal. It is now known as the Ankeny Canal.

Charles and Rufus Moore dug a canal on the other side of the Link River in 1877 to power a sawmill and transport logs from Upper Klamath Lake. This later became known as the Keno Canal.

On February 24, 1917, officials from the USBR and COPCO reached an agreement to lease the Keno Canal for ten years at a rate of $1,000 per annum. The agreement also allowed the power company to regulate the outflows of Klamath Lake. In 1919, COPCO placed a temporary low-crib dam near what is now Putnam's Point in 1919. Construction began on the dam on July 29, 1920.

Senator George E. Chamberlain of Oregon telegraphed Secretary of the Interior John B. Payne on August 20, 1920, requesting he halt dam construction long enough to determine the legality of the 1917 contract. Payne issued a supplemental contract on December 10, and California-Oregon Power restarted construction on May 15, 1921, finishing it on October 29.

== Current operations ==
As a 50-year contract between the USBR and PacifiCorp reached its expiration in 2006, the company proposed closing down hydroelectric generation at Link River. It cited the high costs of complying with fish passage remediation. This proposal would have left the dam in place for water storage and flood control. (The proposal was distinct from the proposed removal of four other dams, operated by the same company in the same watershed.)

As of 2014 the company intends to continue to generate electricity at Link River, in the short term and at reduced output. PacifiCorp implemented changes of operation are intended to reduce the loss to two endangered species, the Lost River sucker and Shortnose sucker, by some 90%. Further decommissioning discussion remain pending with the governing agency, the Federal Energy Regulatory Commission.
