= 2002 Klamath River fish kill =

2002 disaster in the United States

The 2002 Klamath River fish kill occurred on the Klamath River in California, USA in September 2002. According to the official estimate of mortality, about 34,000 fish died. Though some counts may estimate over 70,000 adult chinook salmon (Oncorhynchus tshawytscha) were killed when returning to the river to spawn, making it the largest salmon kill in the history of the Western United States. Besides the chinook salmon, other fish that perished include: steelhead (O. mykiss), coho salmon (O. kisutch), sculpins (Cottus spp.), speckled dace (Rhinichthys osculus), and Klamath smallscale sucker (Catostomus rimiculus).

A report by the U.S. Fish and Wildlife Service found that the kill resulted from water diversions to Klamath Basin by farmers and ranchers during a drought year. The report found that the atypical low flow in the river along with high fish return numbers and high water temperatures allowed for a gill rot disease to kill at least 33,000 salmon in September 2002, before they could reproduce. The die-off was downstream of the Trinity inflow, and the salmon of the Trinity were impacted to a greater degree than the Klamath as the Trinity run was at its peak. The report does mention that the official fish die-off estimate of 34,056 is probably quite low and could be only half of the actual loss. Klamath River flows as measured at the river gauge in Keno show a low flow of 800 cubic feet per second (22.7 m^{3}/s) in September 1908 (before irrigation began). During the 2002 fish kill, flows of 475 cubic feet per second (13.5 m^{3}/s) were recorded. During September of the 2001 irrigation shut-off, an average of 688 cubic feet per second (19.5 m^{3}/s) was recorded. These lower water flows were decided on against the suggestions of higher water flows biologists had said would be needed to keep the fish safe from a die off.

In 2007, it was reported that United States Vice President Dick Cheney played a role in diverting water to farmers and ranchers for political gain. The House Natural Resources Committee began an investigation into his role in instigating the fish kill.

The fish kill played an important role in stirring an effort by local Native American peoples, in concert with environmentalists and fishers, to remove dams on the Klamath River. The Klamath Basin Restoration Agreement (KBRA) was carefully negotiated and signed by the tribes, the farmers, and PacifiCorp in 2010, but failed to pass through Congress. On April 6, 2016, the U.S. Secretary of the Interior Sally Jewell, Yurok Tribal Chair Thomas P. O'Rourke Sr., Karuk Tribal Chair Russell "Buster" Attebery, Klamath Tribal Chair Don Gentry, the governors of Oregon and California, and dam owner PacificCorp signed the landmark agreements, which include a new piece of legislation: the Upper Klamath Basin Comprehensive Agreement. The Yurok tribe released a statement in September 2015 acknowledging their withdrawal of support from the landmark agreements due to its dilution of fishing and water rights that would have been acknowledged under KBRA.

== Community responses ==
A play called Salmon is Everything was a collaboration between tribal members and Humboldt State University Theatre professor Theresa May to communicate the impact of the fish kill, featuring a cast which included people from the Hupa, Karuk, and Yurok communities. The play presents the experience of the members of the Yurok, Hoopa Valley, and Karuk tribes, as well as farmers, ranchers, and others invested in the Klamath watershed. Karuk woman, Kathleen McCovey, provided the play with a spiritual perspective through an elder character, Rose. Rose's character demonstrates to the audience the intrinsic role salmon plays in Karuk and Yurok culture:

"Rose: ...You see, to the Karuk people everything and everyone has a purpose. The spirit people taught the Karuk how to live on the land, what to do, what to eat, how to behave, and how and when to conduct ceremonies. Then when the Karuk people knew what to do the spirit people went into the sky, the earth, the trees, the animals the rocks, and into the plants. You see, when I am in the forest, I am never alone, I am surrounded by spirit people."

The play was first performed at Humboldt State University, and later at the University of Oregon. The book was the Book of the Year for Humboldt State University for 2015–2016.

Many documentaries have arisen from the event as well due to the heavy public response to the issue and the agreements that were settled in the aftermath. A River Between Us directed by Gregori J. Martin explains the various sides of the argument and shows how one native tribe went to a potato festival held by the people on the opposite side of the argument to help understand each other better and gain common ground. From the documentary it is clear many people gained common grounds with each other over time in the aftermath of the event.
