= Link River =

Short river in southern Oregon, United States

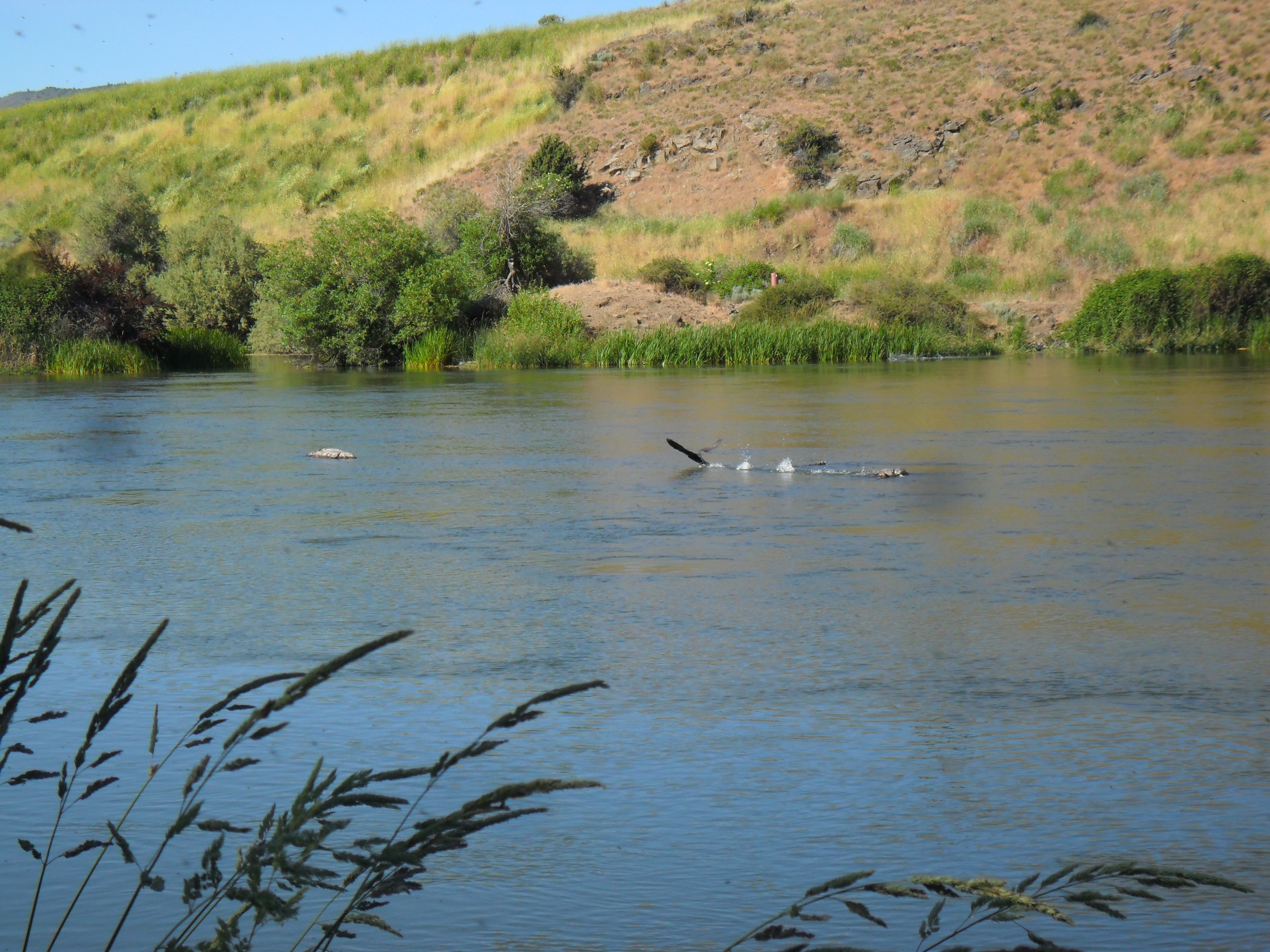
- Link River, upstream of the Link River Dam

- Location of the mouth of the Link River in Oregon
- Etymology: Waterway connecting two lakes

Location
- Country: United States
- State: Oregon
- County: Klamath

Physical characteristics
- Source: Upper Klamath Lake
  - coordinates: 42°14′19″N 121°48′15″W
  - elevation: 4,149 ft (1,265 m)
- Mouth: Lake Ewauna
  - location: Klamath Falls
  - coordinates: 42°13′08″N 121°47′18″W
  - elevation: 4,091 ft (1,247 m)
- Length: 1.5 mi (2.4 km)
- Basin size: 3,810 sq mi (9,900 km^{2})
- Discharge
  - location: 0.4 miles (0.64 km) upstream of Main Street Bridge
  - average: 1,276 cu ft/s (36.1 m^{3}/s)
  - minimum: 17 cu ft/s (0.48 m^{3}/s)
  - maximum: 9,400 cu ft/s (270 m^{3}/s)

The Link River is a short river connecting Upper Klamath Lake to Lake Ewauna in the city of Klamath Falls in the U.S. state of Oregon. Draining a basin of 3,810 square miles (9,900 km^{2}), the river begins at the southern end of Klamath Lake and flows a short distance to the Link River Dam and continues 1.5 miles (2.4 km) to the head of Lake Ewauna. The "falls" from which Klamath Falls derives its name, and which in reality are best described as rapids rather than falls, are visible a short distance below the dam, though the water flow is generally insufficient to provide water flow over the rocks. The Klamath River begins at the narrow southern end of Lake Ewauna and flows 253 miles (407 km) from there to the Pacific Ocean.

Before settlers came to the Klamath Basin, the Link River was known to the local Klamaths as Yulalona, meaning "back and forth." At times, strong winds blew the water upstream into Klamath Lake and partly drained the riverbed.

After its founding in 1867, Klamath Falls was originally named Linkville. The name was changed to Klamath Falls in 1892–93.

== See also ==
- List of rivers of Oregon

== Works cited ==
- McArthur, Lewis A., and McArthur, Lewis L. (2003) [1928]. Oregon Geographic Names, 7th ed. Portland: Oregon Historical Society Press. ISBN 0-87595-277-1.
