= Klamath Basin Restoration Agreement =

American multi-party legal agreement

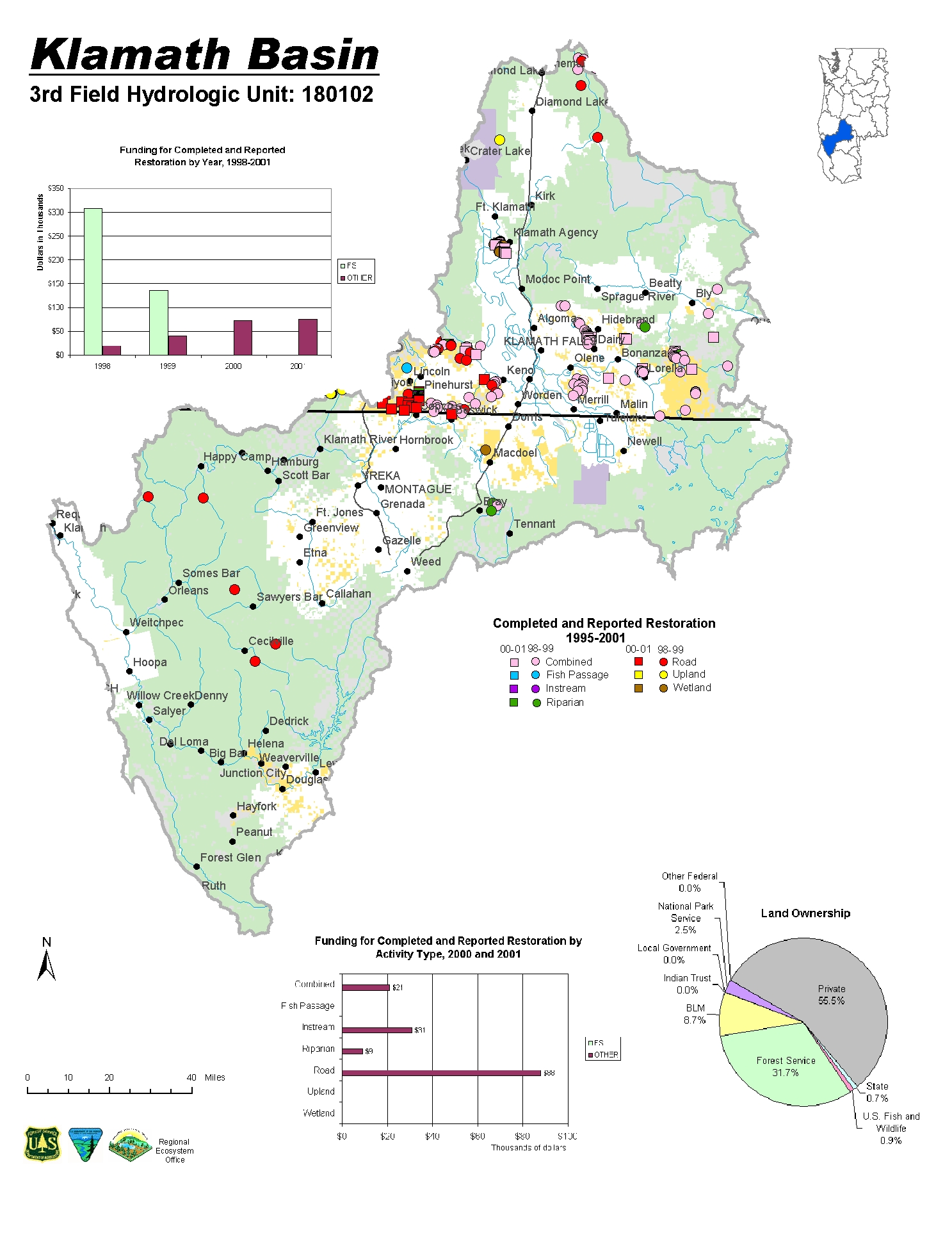
The Klamath River Basin extends from Southern Oregon into Northern California. The region is the historic home of the Native American Klamath, Modoc, and Yahooskin peoples.

The Klamath Basin Restoration Agreement (KBRA) is an American multi-party legal agreement determining river usage and water rights involving the Klamath River and Klamath Basin in the states of California and Oregon. Discussion of the KBRA began in 2005. Parties to the agreement included the state of California, the state of Oregon, the Karuk Tribe, the Klamath Tribes, the Yurok Tribe, Del Norte County, California, Humboldt County, California, Klamath County, Oregon, Siskiyou County, California; 26 private individuals, companies, and local irrigation districts; and seven NGOs including California Trout and Trout Unlimited.

Congress failed to pass legislation that would implement the KBRA by the January 1, 2016 deadline, but a new agreement, the Klamath Hydroelectric Settlement Agreement, was signed later that year. The four dams were removed by 2024, and salmon quickly returned to Oregon's stretch of the Klamath Basin for the first time in more than a century.

== History ==
=== Background ===
The idea behind the document originally stemmed from the 2001 irrigation water shutoff to Klamath Project farmers, when water was withheld from the irrigators in favor of the threatened coho salmon and the endangered Lost River Sucker. Downstream populations of coho salmon are within the Southern Oregon/Northern California Evolutionary Significant Unit and are listed as threatened (2011).

That summer, a symbolic bucket brigade was held, where nearly 20,000 people passed 50 buckets of water, one for each state, from Upper Klamath Lake to the A canal that supplies water to the Klamath Project.

=== Development ===
Talks commenced in 2005; a draft was proposed by 2009.

The Klamath Basin Restoration Agreement (KBRA) is a document that aimed to:

- help restore Riparian Zones along much of the rivers in the Klamath Basin
- remove 4 Hydroelectric dams on the Klamath River with the goal of salmon restoration
- provide irrigation water assurances for Klamath Basin farmers
- provide the Klamath Tribes with the 90,000 acre Mazama Tree Farm

=== Signing ===
The final document was signed on February 18, 2010, in Salem, Oregon. Among the more notable signatories to the agreement was the Governor of California, Arnold Schwarzenegger, the Governor of Oregon, Ted Kulongoski, and the Chairman of the Klamath Tribes, Joseph Kirk.

Congress failed to pass legislation that would implement the KBRA by the January 1, 2016 deadline.

A new agreement, the Klamath Hydroelectric Settlement Agreement (KHSA) was signed on April 6, 2016, which planned to remove four hydroelectric dams (the Copco 1, Copco 2, J.C. Boyle, and Iron Gate) by 2020.

In November 2022, federal approval was granted for the dam removals, with deconstruction efforts commencing in 2023. The project was completed ahead of schedule in October 2024, marking the largest dam removal in U.S. history. Within weeks, adult fall Chinook salmon made it all the way to Oregon's stretch of the Klamath Basin for the first time in more than a century. Work continues to replant and restore thousands of acres of land that had been underwater.
