= Klamath Basin =

Region in the U.S. states of Oregon and California drained by the Klamath River

Coordinates: 42°N 122°W

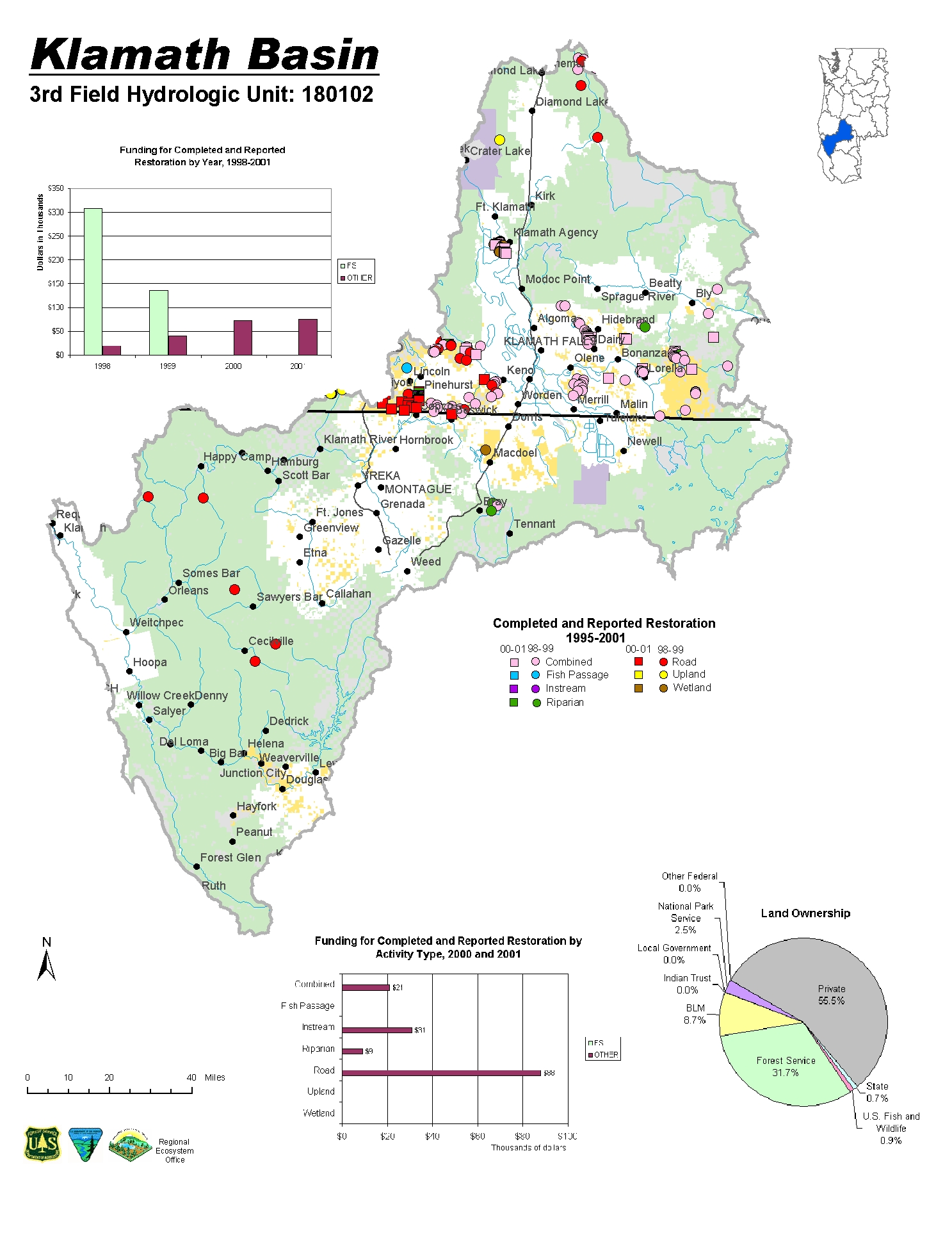
Klamath Basin

The Klamath Basin is the region in the U.S. states of Oregon and California drained by the Klamath River. It contains most of Klamath County and parts of Lake and Jackson counties in Oregon, and parts of Del Norte, Humboldt, Modoc, Siskiyou, and Trinity counties in California. The 15,751-square-mile (40,790 km^{2}) drainage basin is 35% in Oregon and 65% in California. In Oregon, the watershed typically lies east of the Cascade Range, while California contains most of the river's segment that passes through the mountains. In the Oregon-far northern California segment of the river, the watershed is semi-desert at lower elevations and dry alpine in the upper elevations. In the western part of the basin, in California, however, the climate is more of temperate rainforest, and the Trinity River watershed consists of a more typical alpine climate.

== Geology and hydrology ==
The Upper Klamath Watershed lies between the Cascade Range and the Basin and Range Province in southern Oregon and northern California. Bedrock stratigraphy in the area includes volcanic deposits, volcanic ejecta, and fluviolacustrine deposits. This creates three general hydrologic layers: 1) Highly permeable basalt with an older depositional age serving as the principle aquifer, 2) fluvial deposits made up of tuff, shale, agglomerate, sandstone, and volcanic ash that are collectively known as the Yonna Formation and act as a groundwater cap, and 3) more recent eruptive volcanic deposits that overlie the aquifer. Little water is able to permeate through the upper volcanic deposit layers to the principle aquifers. Groundwater is able to move freely throughout the upper basin despite geologic structures that occur due to normal faulting which only confine groundwater on a local scale. Artesian wells discharging into the Upper Klamath Lake are essential for recharge into the lake and Klamath River flow throughout the year. Snowmelt is currently a large contributor of groundwater recharge in the Upper Klamath Basin.

== Distribution of subwatersheds ==
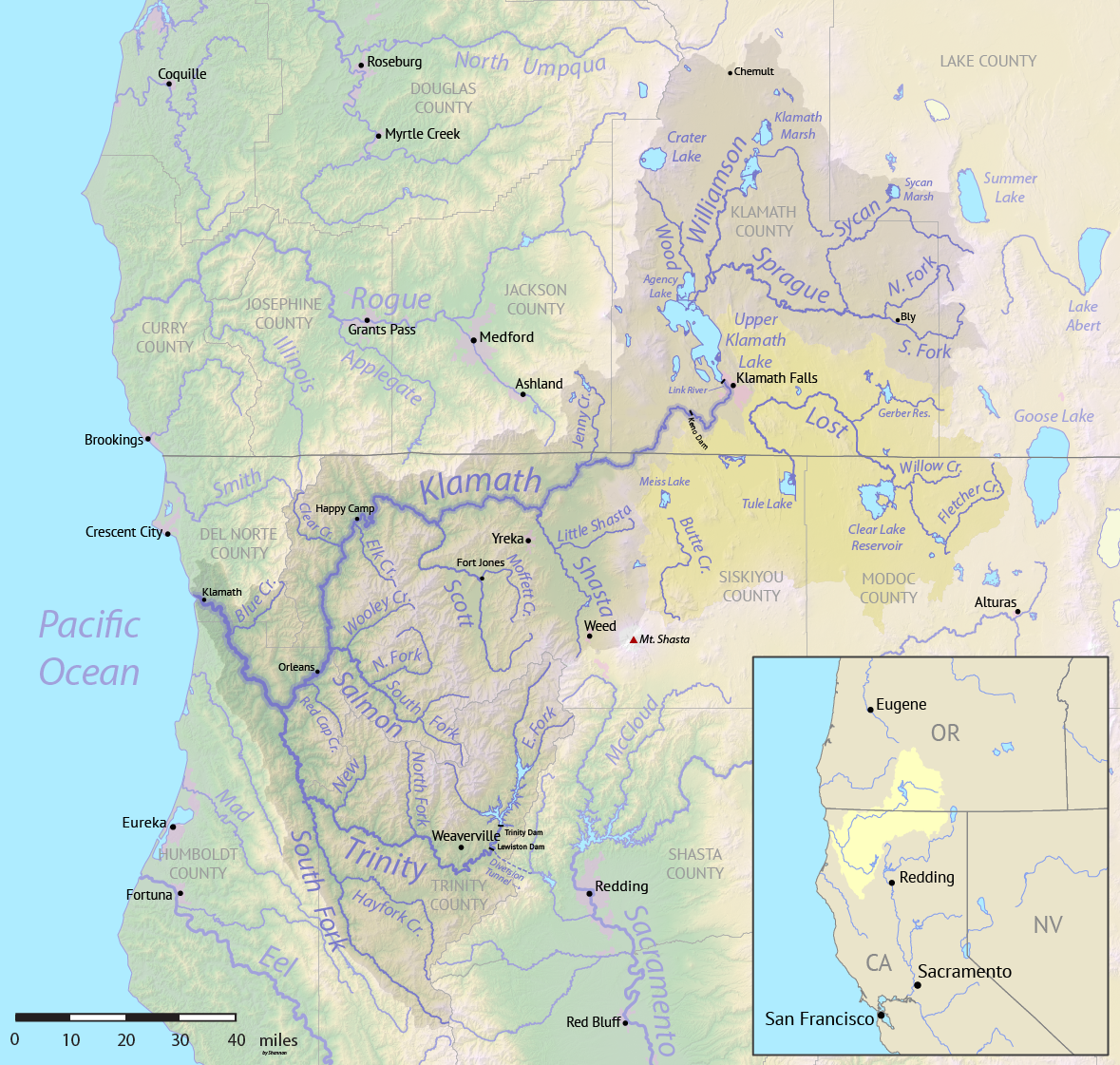
Map of the Klamath River drainage basin

The drainage basins of the Williamson and Sprague Rivers, in Oregon, are to the north and northeast of Upper Klamath Lake. Together, the two watersheds cover 3,069 square miles (7,950 km^{2}), or 19.4% of the Klamath River watershed. The basin of the Lost River, the largest subwatershed by area, lies to the southeast of Upper Klamath Lake and to the east of Lower Klamath Lake. This covers 3,009 square miles (7,790 km^{2}) or 19.1% of the Klamath River watershed—nearly as much as the Williamson and Sprague. Proceeding west, the adjoining Butte Creek, Shasta, Scott and Salmon River watersheds have 603 square miles (1,560 km^{2}), 795 square miles (2,060 km^{2}), 813 square miles (2,110 km^{2}), and 750 square miles (1,900 km^{2}), respectively. These account for 4.3%, 5%, 5.2%. and 5% of the Klamath River watershed, respectively, or 19.5% of the watershed if put together.

Further southwest, the watershed of the Trinity River, the second largest subwatershed of the Klamath, has 2,965 square miles (7,680 km^{2}) or 19% of the watershed. The watershed of the South Fork Trinity River is 980 square miles (2,500 km^{2})—33% of the Trinity watershed or 6% of the Klamath watershed. The primary tributaries of the Klamath together account for 77% of the total Klamath watershed—the remaining land area is drained by smaller tributaries such as Jenny Creek, Fall Creek and Blue Creek.

== Major bodies of water ==
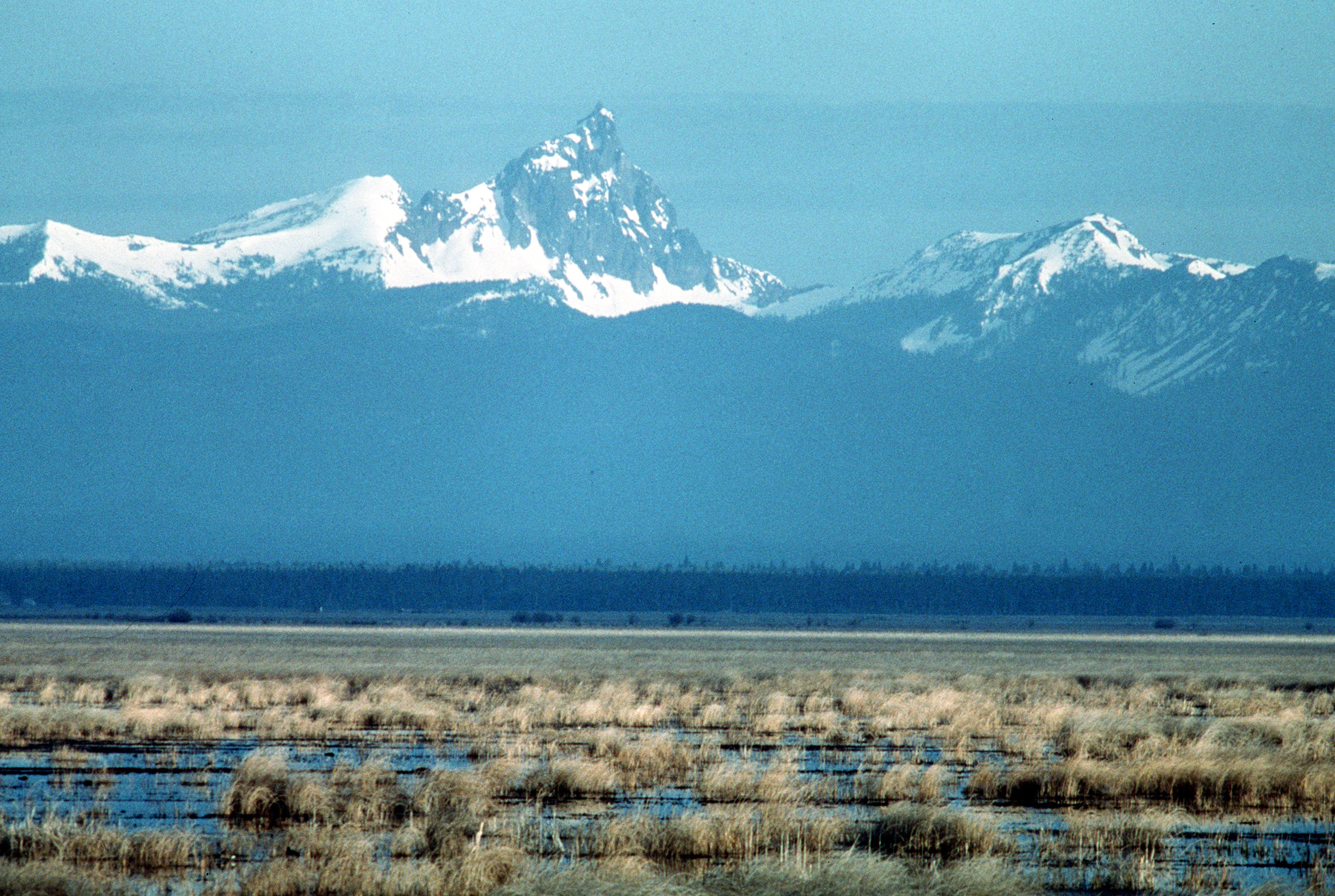
The Upper Klamath Basin today, showing the remnants of the vast Lake Modoc. Mount Thielsen is in the background.

Upper Klamath Lake is the largest present-day body of water in the Klamath River watershed, covering 96 square miles (250 km^{2}) on average, with a shoreline of 87 miles (140 km). It is also the largest freshwater lake in the state of Oregon. Historically, Lower Klamath Lake and Tule Lake were one interconnected freshwater marsh that totaled 195 square miles (510 km^{2})—more than twice the present-day dimensions of Upper Klamath Lake. This interconnected wetland still supports up to 3.7 million migrating birds per year. In wet years, the two lakes would connect to Upper Klamath Lake, forming one huge body of water. These lakes occupy the basin that was prehistorically occupied by Lake Modoc, a 1,100-square-mile (2,800 km^{2}) freshwater lake that covered the entire Upper Klamath Basin, or 7% of the watershed—an area three times larger than the massive Salton Sea in southern California. This lake existed up to 11,000 years ago at the end of the most recent ice age. Today, Upper Klamath Lake encompasses just 0.6% of the Klamath watershed.

There are also several artificial bodies of water in the watershed—including Lake Ewauna, J.C. Boyle Reservoir, Copco Lake, and Iron Gate Reservoir on the main Klamath. Lake Ewauna, also called Keno Reservoir, is 3.8 square miles (9.8 km^{2}) in size, and is about 20 miles (30 km) long. The J.C. Boyle Reservoir is much smaller, with a surface area of 0.65 square miles (1.7 km^{2}). Copco Reservoir is about 5.4 miles (8.7 km) long and is 1 square mile (2.6 km^{2}) in area. Iron Gate Reservoir covers 1.4 square miles (3.6 km^{2}) and is about 6.8 miles (10.9 km) long. Together, the four lower mainstem reservoirs total just 6.85 square miles (17.7 km^{2}), or 0.04% of the Klamath River watershed.

Trinity Lake, on the mainstem of the Trinity River, is the largest tributary reservoir in the Klamath River watershed. At 25 square miles (65 km^{2}) in size, it is larger than all four mainstem Klamath reservoirs combined (excluding Upper Klamath Lake).

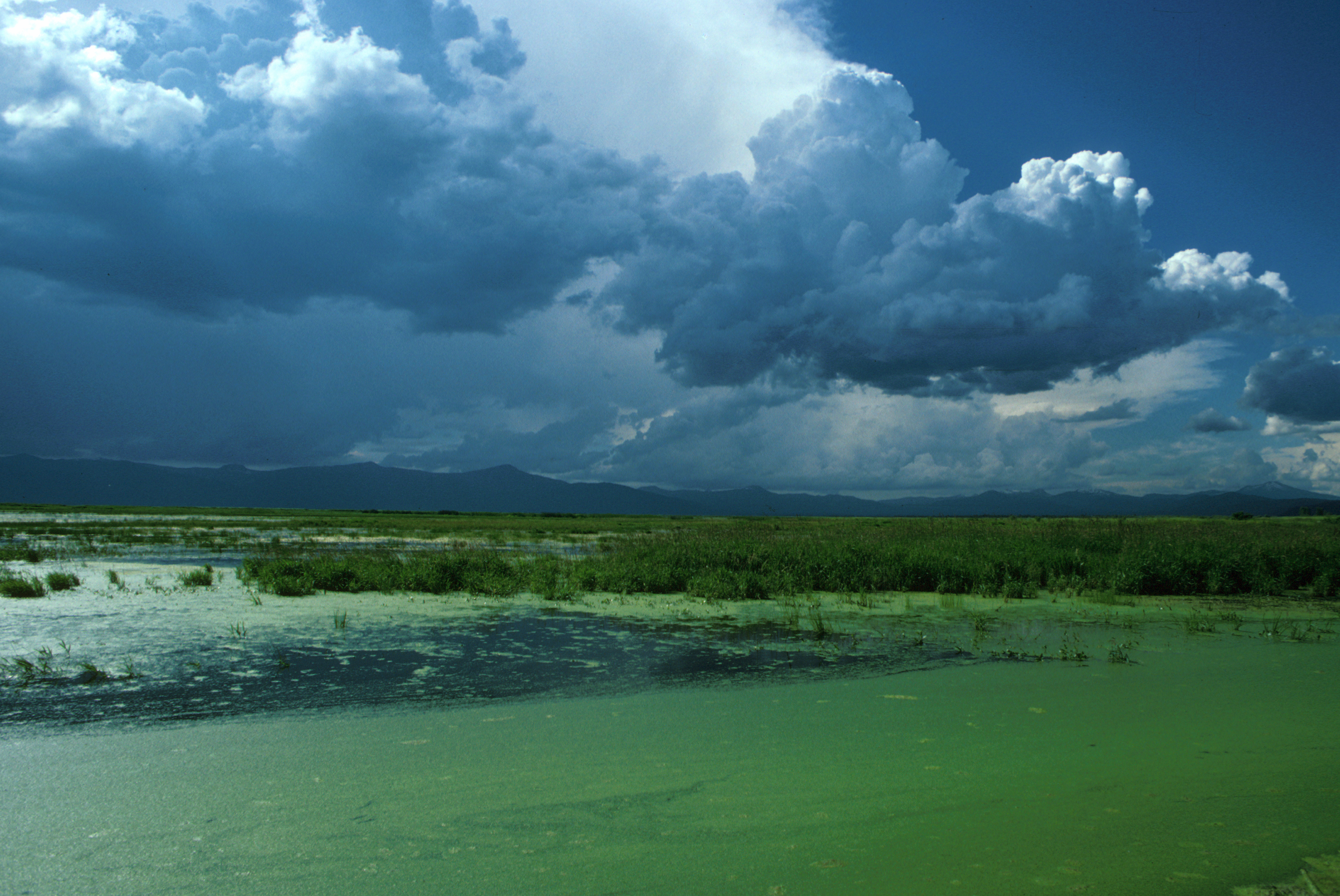
Landscape of the basin

== Watershed ==
According to the USGS watershed classification system, the Klamath Watershed is a 6-digit, level 3 Accounting Unit within Region 18, known as the California watershed region. The accounting unit of the Klamath Watershed is 180102 and includes twelve 8-digit Hydrologic Units (HUCs) covering 9.4 million acres. In the 2000 census, about 114,000 people were estimated to be living within the Klamath Watershed. The largest population centers include Klamath Falls, Oregon (19,462) and Yreka, California (7,290). Land ownership within the basin breaks down into the following: about 90,000 acres are controlled by tribal reservations, 6.2 million acres are managed by public agencies (including the Bureau of Land Management, National Forests, National Wildlife Refuges, and National Park Service), and 3.7 million is privately owned. Of the privately owned land, 557,000 acres are used for farming 80% of which is irrigated farmland. Nearly half of irrigated land utilizes water from the Bureau of Reclamation’s Klamath Project. The vast majority of privately owned agriculture and rangeland occurs in the Lost River and Shasta River sub-basins.

The Klamath Basin watershed includes:

These three rivers are located above (north) of the Klamath Lake basin:

- Sprague River, Oregon
- Williamson River, Oregon
- Sycan River, Oregon

These features are inside or near the Klamath Lake basin:

- Upper Klamath Lake, Oregon
- Link River, Oregon
- Agency Lake, Oregon
- Lost River, Oregon, California
- Clear Lake Reservoir, California
- Tule Lake, California
- Lower Klamath Lake, California

These are the major downstream tributaries of the Klamath River:

- Butte Creek, California, Oregon
- Shasta River, California
- Scott River, California
- Salmon River, California
- Trinity River, California

== Communities ==
Communities in the Klamath Basin include:

- Merrill, Oregon
- Bly, Oregon
- Beatty, Oregon
- Bonanza, Oregon
- Chiloquin, Oregon
- Happy Camp, California
- Klamath Falls, Oregon
- Sprague River, Oregon
- Tulelake, California
- Weaverville, California
- Yreka, California

== See also ==
- Crater Lake
- Klamath Basin National Wildlife Refuges Complex
- Klamath National Forest
- Klamath Reclamation Project
- Modoc National Forest
- Shasta-Trinity National Forest
