= Lucy Raven =

American artist

Lucy Raven (born 1977) is an American artist. Raven's work is multidisciplinary and includes moving image installations, photography, sound, animation and performative lectures.

== Early life and education ==
Raven was born in Tucson, Arizona, in 1977. She holds two degrees from the University of Arizona Tucson: a BFA in studio art, and a Bachelor of Arts in art history. In 2008 she received a MFA degree from Bard College. Raven is an associate professor at The Cooper Union.

== Work ==
Early presentations of Raven's work included Con Air II, Performa 05, New York, 2005; In Practice, Sculpture Center, Long Island City, New York (2007); Eastern Standard, MASS MoCA, North Adams, Massachusetts (2008).

Raven's break out work was China Town (2009) which premiered at MoMA PS1 as part of the 2010 iteration of Greater New York.China Town is a photographic animation with sound, that follows a global production line of copper from an open pit mine in Nevada to a smelter in China, where the raw ore is sent to be processed, refined, and eventually turned into copper wire, used to power China's rapid urbanization.

Her piece What Manchester Does Today the Rest of the World Does Tomorrow (2011) featured in Klaus Biesenbach and Hans Ulrich Obrist's 11 Rooms project for the Manchester International Festival in 2011 (subsequently 12 Rooms in Ruhrtiennale, Essen, Germany).

The following year, Raven was featured in the 2012 Whitney Biennial, curated by Jay Sanders and Elisabeth Sussman. 2012 also saw Raven conduct a residency at the Hammer Museum in Los Angeles where she presented the 35mm film installation RP31 (2012).

=== Solo shows 2013 – 2019 ===
Raven's most ambitious project to date is The Drumfire, a trilogy of moving image installations and related works whose overarching focus is the Western United States and the mythologies surrounding its physical and imaged landscape.

The first chapter of the series, Ready Mix, was commissioned and subsequently presented by the Dia Art Foundation, to inaugurate their Chelsea location in 2022. Filmed at a concrete plant in Idaho, Ready Mix records the churning transformation of mineral aggregates and cement binders into one of the world's most ubiquitous building materials: ready-mix concrete. The film's extra-wide aspect ratio references the surveying origins of the anamorphic format. Ready Mix also expands on Raven's preoccupation with the extraction of natural resources, changes of material states, and manufacturing processes that generate the physical substrates for today's interconnected economies. At times the film evokes the temporary liquidity of concrete as well as the fluid (while seemingly intractable) forces that shape the development of infrastructure.

The second chapter of the trilogy was filmed at an explosives range in Socorro, New Mexico. The two resulting films, Demolition of a Wall (Album 1) and Demolition of a Wall (Album 2) have been exhibited extensively. Album 1 was included in the 2022 Whitney Biennial, Quiet as It's Kept, curated by David Breslin and Adrienne Edwards. Album 2 was co-commissioned by Weils, Forest, Berlin and The Momentary at Crystal Bridges, Bentonville, Arkansas, USA.

The third chapter of the trilogy is in production and will premiere in 2025.

In each of these works, Raven has collaborated extensively with Deantoni Parks, a percussionist and composer. In addition to his work as composer on the entire Drumfire, Parks also collaborated with Raven on Remix: Ready Mix, an LP produced and released by Dia.

Parks has also performed live in conjunction with the Dia installation, and will perform again in February 2024 at the opening of Ready Mix at the Neue Nationalgalerie in Berlin.

Over the past decade, Raven has been included in significant group shows globally, including and Materials and Money and Crisis, Mumok, Vienna, Austria; Test Pattern, Whitney Museum of American Art (both 2013); the 31st Biennial of Graphic Arts, Ljubljana, Slovenia (2015); La Biennale de Montréal, Montreal, Canada; The Artist's Medium, ICA Boston, Boston, Massachusetts (both 2016); Generation Loss, Julia Stosheck Collection, Düsseldorf; Matrix for Actual Time, MASP, San Paulo, Brazil; Multiple Future, Yebisu International Festival of Art and Alternative Visions, Tokyo (all 2017); Dhaka Art Summit, Dhaka, Bangladesh; 3D: Double Vision, LACMA, Los Angeles (both 2018); and most recently Drum Listens to Heart, CCA Wattis, San Francisco; A Divided Landscape, The Momentary at Crystal Bridges, Bentonville, Arkansas (both 2022).

In 2017 she won the “Kunst am Bau” (Art in Architecture) competition to install an artwork in the Bauhaus Museum Dessau.

== Events in 2025 ==
From 11 October 2025 to 19 January 2026, British-American visual artist Lucy Raven presented her new exhibition, Rounds, at The Curve Gallery within the Barbican Centre in London. The show included the UK premiere of her moving image installation Murderers Bar (2025), showing the un-daming of the Klamath River and the consequent rush of water to the Pacific Ocean, using both aerial film and lidar/sonar generated animation. The piece combines sculpture, moving image, and ecological narratives. Raven, known for her work at the intersection of art and cinema, garnered critical attention for her focus on the hidden history of dam projects in the U.S..
