= Lake Ewauna =

Artificial lake in Klamath County, southern Oregon, United States

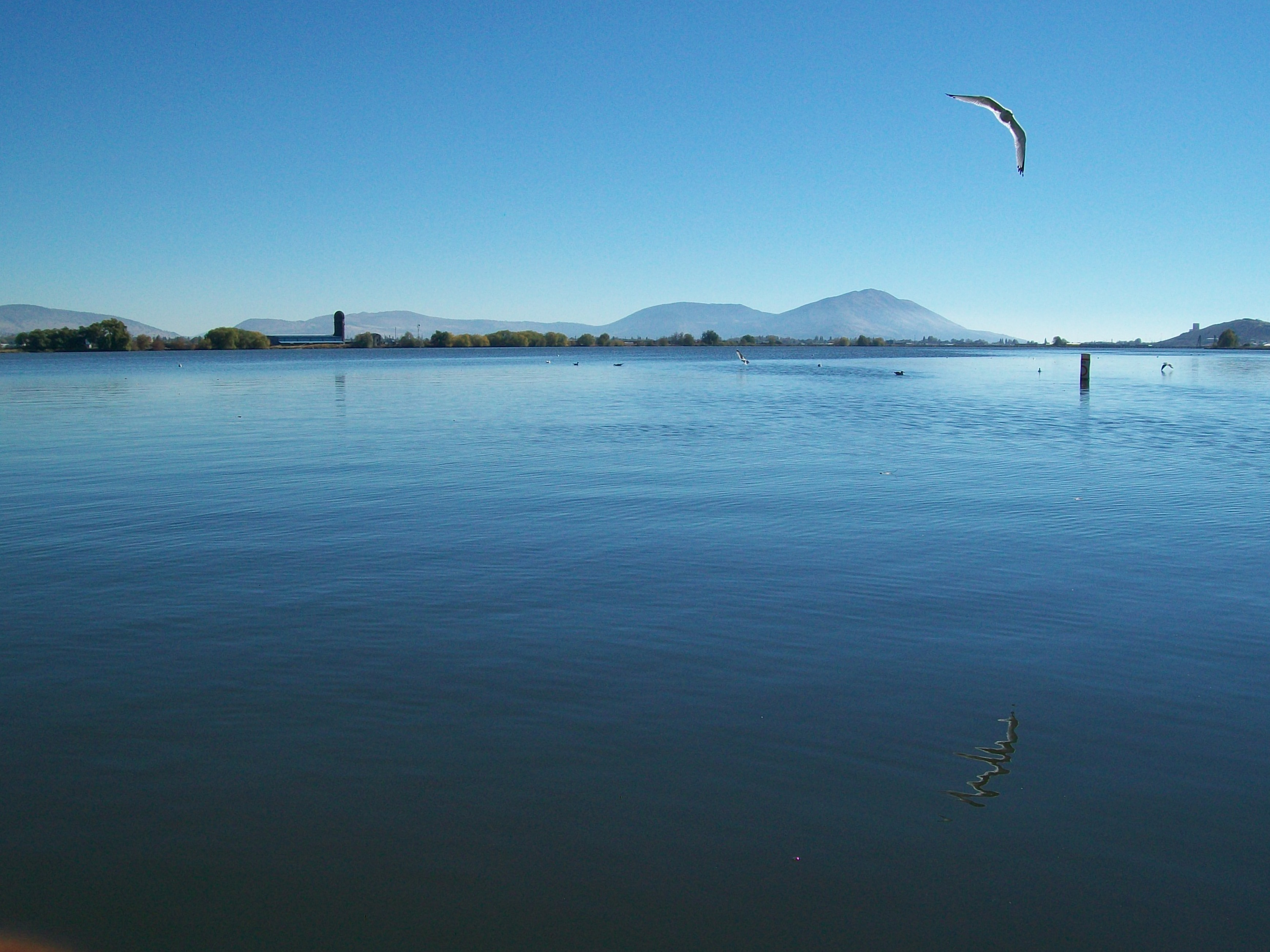
- A gull flying over Ewauna Lake

- Location within Oregon Location within the United States
- Location: Klamath Falls, Oregon, United States
- Coordinates: 42.21333°N 121.77861°W
- Primary inflows: Link River
- Basin countries: United States

Lake Ewauna is a reservoir in Klamath Falls, Oregon. It is the headwaters of the Klamath River, fed by the Link River from Upper Klamath Lake. Its constant level throughout the year is controlled by the release of water from Keno Dam, 18 mi (29 km) south of the Link River's mouth on the reservoir. Dam and reservoir are elements of the Klamath River Hydroelectric Project.

Lake Ewauna is an ideal length for crew rowing, and the Ewauna Rowing Club has used the lake for practice and competition since 1970.

== Lumber industry ==
Lake Ewauna was home to several lumber mills in the 20th century, and was a log pond for those mills. The last floating logs came out in the 1990s as the last mill on the lake shore, Modoc Lumber Company, closed its doors. The former Modoc mill site is now being developed as Timbermill Shores.

Some logs were removed from the lake bottom in the late 1990s but many remain still on the bottom, remnants of a near century of log pond use. A few logs rise to the surface in spring every year causing hazard to boat traffic.

== See also ==
- Upper Klamath Lake
- Lower Klamath Lake
- Klamath River−related topics
- List of lakes and reservoirs in Oregon
