= Keno, Oregon =

Unincorporated community in the state of Oregon, United States

- Unincorporated community
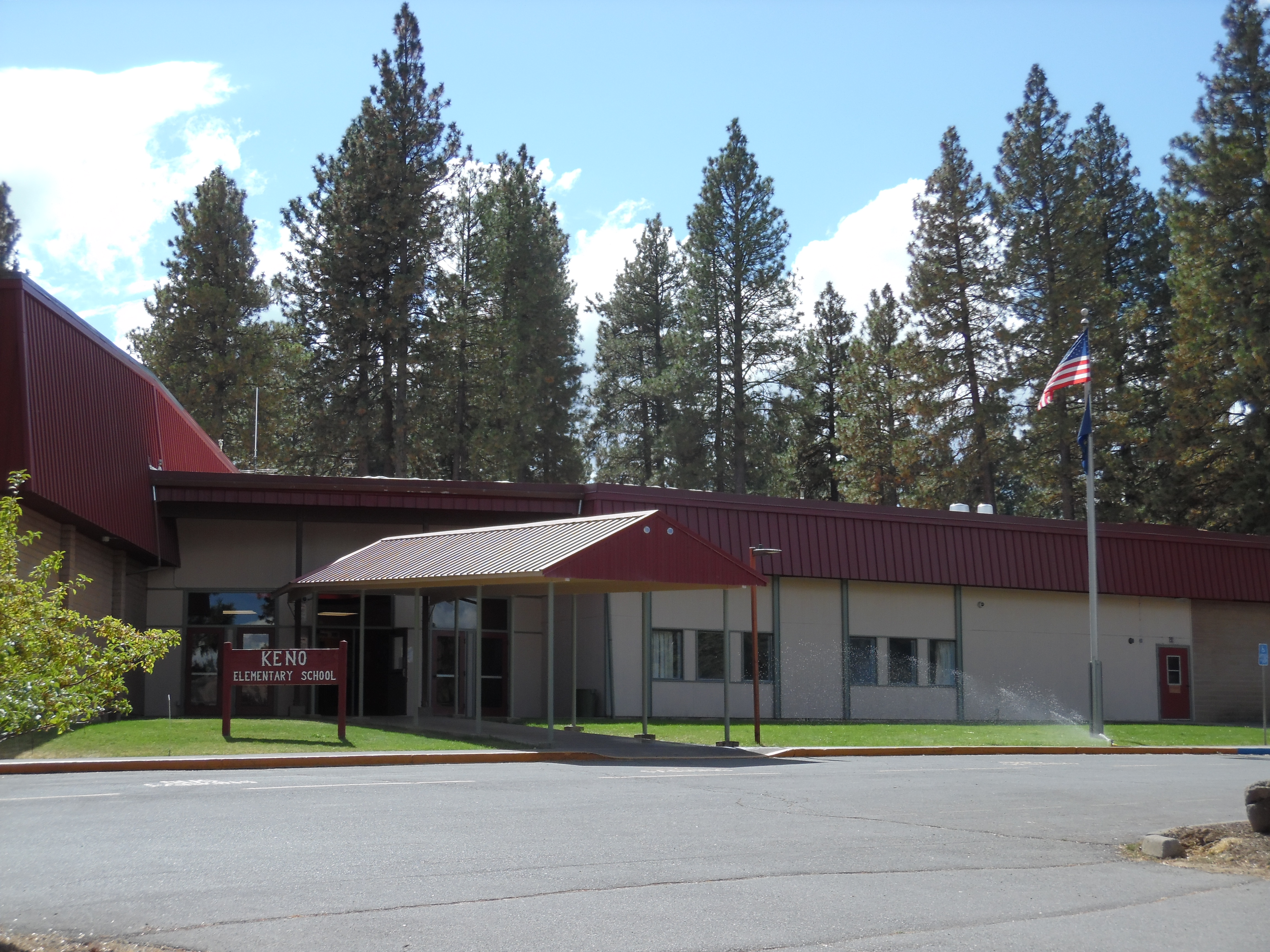
- Keno entrance sign, elementary school in the background.

- Location within Oregon and the United States Keno (the United States)
- Coordinates: 42°07′36″N 121°54′24″W
- Country: United States
- State: Oregon
- County: Klamath

Area
  - Total: 9.57 sq mi (24.79 km^{2})
  - Land: 9.25 sq mi (23.96 km^{2})
  - Water: 0.32 sq mi (0.82 km^{2})
- Elevation: 4,114 ft (1,254 m)

Population (2020)
  - Total: 1,980
  - Density: 214.0/sq mi (82.62/km^{2})
- Time zone: UTC-8 (Pacific (PST))
  - Summer (DST): UTC-7 (PDT)
- ZIP code: 97627
- Area codes: 458 and 541
- FIPS code: 41-38750
- GNIS feature ID: 2805455

Keno is an unincorporated community in Klamath County, Oregon, United States, southwest of Klamath Falls on the Klamath River near Oregon Route 66. As of the 2020 census, Keno had a population of 1,980. Keno has one school, Keno Elementary. It is a K–6 school in the Klamath County School District.

== History ==
A post office called Whittles Ferry was established within the area that is now attributed as Keno on September 22, 1876, with Robert Marple as its very first postmaster. The name thus did not initially derive from the first postmaster, but the Robert Whittle, who operated the ferry.

Postal authorities rejected the initial name, and also the other proposed name for the location, "Klamath River". Another attempt was made, changing the name to "Plevna" on January 9, 1878, and the office was moved northeast where it would however cease to be used after it closed in March 1892.

The local patrons, were furious, and thus created a new post office, named "Keno post office" which established in 1887. Keno was supposedly named after the first postmaster's bird dog.

== Climate ==
This region experiences warm (but not hot) and dry summers, with no average monthly temperatures above 85 °F (29 °C). According to the Köppen Climate Classification system, Keno has a dry-summer humid continental climate, abbreviated "Dsb" on climate maps.

Climate data for Keno, OR
Month	Jan	Feb	Mar	Apr	May	Jun	Jul	Aug	Sep	Oct	Nov	Dec	Year
Record high °F (°C)	58 (14)	62 (17)	65 (18)	81 (27)	85 (29)	94 (34)	97 (36)	99 (37)	92 (33)	86 (30)	61 (16)	55 (13)	99 (37)
Mean daily maximum °F (°C)	38.5 (3.6)	42.6 (5.9)	45.7 (7.6)	53.6 (12.0)	64.5 (18.1)	74.5 (23.6)	83.3 (28.5)	85.1 (29.5)	83.8 (28.8)	67 (19)	44.9 (7.2)	37.8 (3.2)	60.1 (15.6)
Mean daily minimum °F (°C)	20 (−7)	21.2 (−6.0)	26.1 (−3.3)	27.5 (−2.5)	33.3 (0.7)	41.3 (5.2)	46.9 (8.3)	46.2 (7.9)	40.7 (4.8)	31.4 (−0.3)	27.1 (−2.7)	16 (−9)	31.5 (−0.3)
Record low °F (°C)	−7 (−22)	−6 (−21)	1 (−17)	14 (−10)	21 (−6)	26 (−3)	30 (−1)	34 (1)	33 (1)	19 (−7)	11 (−12)	−1 (−18)	−7 (−22)
Average precipitation inches (mm)	2.84 (72)	1.99 (51)	1.92 (49)	1.28 (33)	1.21 (31)	0.88 (22)	0.34 (8.6)	0.45 (11)	0.63 (16)	1.5 (38)	2.59 (66)	3.21 (82)	18.84 (479)
Average snowfall inches (cm)	12.3 (31)	10.6 (27)	5.8 (15)	2.0 (5.1)	0.2 (0.51)	0 (0)	0 (0)	0 (0)	0 (0)	0.4 (1.0)	6.6 (17)	14.8 (38)	52.7 (134.61)
Average precipitation days	12.9	9.9	10.9	9.7	8.8	4.6	2.1	2.5	2.8	5.9	10.5	12.3	92.9
Average snowy days (≥ 0.1 inch)	5.6	4.6	3.5	1.5	0.2	0.0	0.0	0.0	0.0	0.3	2.8	6.8	25.3

== Demographics ==
Historical population
Census	Pop.	Note	%±
2020	1,980		—
U.S. Decennial Census

== Education ==
It is within the Klamath County School District.

It is in the territory of Klamath Community College.
