= Iron Gate Dam (California) =

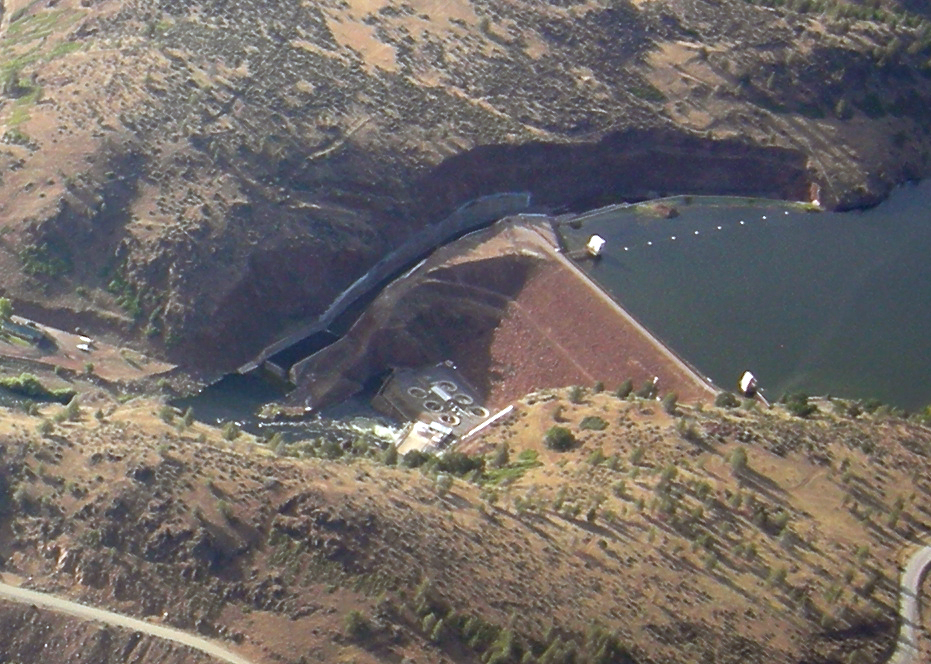
- Iron Gate Dam in 2009

- Location within California
- Country: United States
- Location: Siskiyou County, California
- Coordinates: 41°56′02″N 122°26′07″W
- Opening date: 1964; 62 years ago
- Demolition date: 2024

Dam and spillways
- Type of dam: Earthfill
- Impounds: Klamath River
- Height: 173 ft (53 m)
- Length: 540 ft (160 m)
- Spillway type: Concrete overflow

Reservoir
- Creates: Iron Gate Reservoir
- Total capacity: 58,000 acre⋅ft (72,000,000 m^{3})
- Catchment area: 4,630 mi^{2} (12,000 km^{2})
- Surface area: 1,020 acres (410 ha)
- Maximum water depth: 210 feet (64 m)

Power Station
- Turbines: 2
- Installed capacity: 18 MW
- Annual generation: 112,650,000 kWh

Iron Gate Dam was an earthfill hydroelectric dam on the Klamath River in northern California, outside Hornbrook, California, that opened in 1964. The dam blocked the Klamath River to create the Iron Gate Lake Reservoir. It was the lowermost of a series of power dams on the river, the Klamath River Hydroelectric Project, operated by PacifiCorp. It also posed the first barrier to migrating salmon in the Klamath. The Iron Gate Fish Hatchery was placed just after the dam, hatching salmon and steelhead that were released back into the river.

A movement to Un-Dam the Klamath had been ongoing for 20 years to remove the dams. The Iron Gate Dam (National ID CN 001223), along with the John C. Boyle Dam, were two of four on the Klamath River that would be removed under the Klamath Economic Restoration Act. As of February 2016, the states of Oregon and California, the dam owners, federal regulators, and other parties reached an agreement to remove all four dams by the year 2020, pending approval by the Federal Energy Regulatory Commission. On February 25, 2022, the FERC released its final Environmental Impact Statement (EIS) on the dam's removal.

The Iron Gate Dam was removed in 2024. On January 11, 2024, the bypass tunnel at the dam was opened to drain the reservoir, in anticipation of the dam's removal which began on May 3 and was completed in October.

== Iron Gate Reservoir ==
Iron Gate Reservoir was an artificial lake on the Klamath River in Siskiyou County, California, near the Oregon border of the United States. The lake's waters were impounded by the Iron Gate Dam and operated by PacifiCorp. It had an average depth of 70 feet (21.4 m).

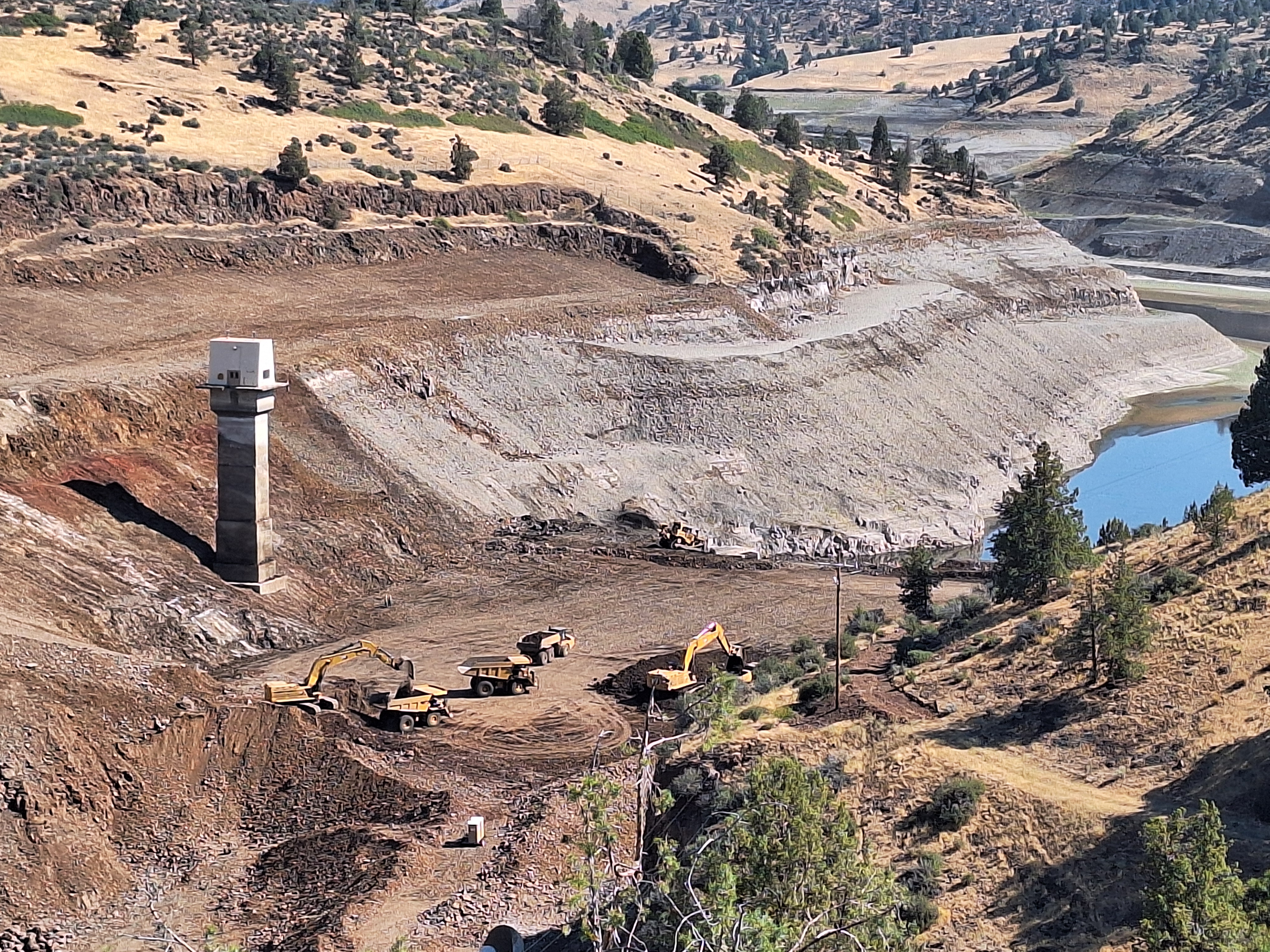
Removal of the Iron Gate Dam in 2024

The Iron Gate Reservoir was host to several recreation activities. There are several campsites on the Western side of the former reservoir. Some campsites, such as Mirror Cove and Juniper Point, are open from May to October. Others, such as Camp Creek, are open year-round. All campsites are free to use. Each site had a launch point, allowing for boating, kayaking, and swimming on the reservoir. The reservoir contained yellow perch, trout, largemouth bass, catfish, and native rainbow trout, which made it a popular fishing location.

In 2020, the state released a danger warning about harmful blue-green algae (cyanobacteria) blooms. These blooms are toxic to humans and animals, so announcements were made warning against swimming in the reservoir and eating any fish from the reservoir. There have been reports in the past, but no warnings have been made since. These algal bloom growths likely occurred due to lower water levels and increasing water temperatures.

In January 2024, the reservoir was drained. Restoration work of the natural river system is ongoing.

== See also ==
- Copco Lake
- List of dams and reservoirs in California
- Un-Dam the Klamath
