= Copco Lake =

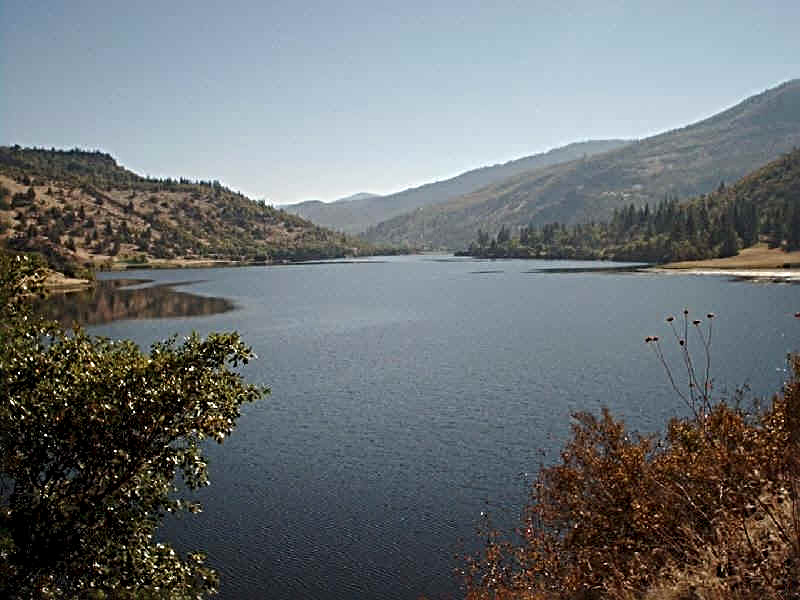
- Copco Lake in the 1990s

- Location within California Location within the United States
- Location: Siskiyou County, California
- Coordinates: 41°58′46″N 122°18′13″W
- Type: reservoir
- Primary inflows: Klamath River, Beaver Creek, Raymond Gulch, Spannaus Gulch, Snackenburg Creek, Milk Creek, Parks Canyon, Indian Creek,
- Primary outflows: Klamath River
- Catchment area: 4,300 square miles (11,000 km^{2})
- Basin countries: United States
- Max. length: 3 miles (4.8 km)
- Max. width: 1,200 yards (1,100 m)
- Surface area: 1,000 acres (400 ha)
- Average depth: 77 feet (23 m)
- Water volume: 77,000 acre-feet (95,000,000 m^{3})
- Surface elevation: 2,605 feet (794 m)

Copco Lake was an artificial lake on the Klamath River in Siskiyou County, California, near the Oregon border. The lake's waters were impounded by the Copco Number 1 Dam, which was completed in 1922 as part of the Klamath River Hydroelectric Project.

The dam was breached in January 2024 as a component of the Klamath River Renewal Project following decades of activism from the Un-Dam the Klamath movement. The dam structure was fully removed by early October 2024.

== History ==
Copco Lake was created by the construction of Copco Number 1 Dam. This dam was completed in 1922 by the California Oregon Power Company (COPCO). COPCO was merged into Pacific Power and Light in 1961, and is now known as Pacificorp.

=== Dam removal ===
Copco Number 1 and Number 2 Dams were two of the four dams in the Klamath River Hydroelectric Project which were removed in the 2020s as part of the Klamath River Renewal Project. The social movement to Un-Dam the Klamath had been ongoing for over 20 years.

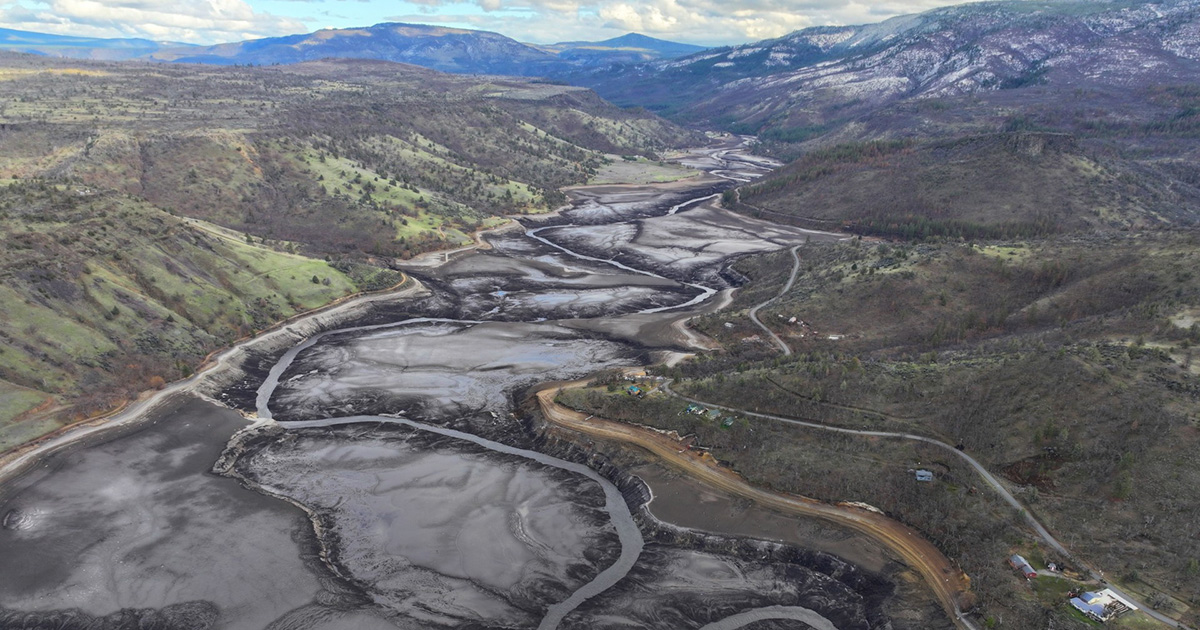
The basin left by the draining of Copco Lake in spring 2024

As of February 2016, the states of Oregon and California, the dam owners, federal regulators and other parties had reached an agreement to remove all four dams by the year 2020, pending approval by the Federal Energy Regulatory Commission (FERC). The plan was delayed in 2020 due to conditions placed on the project by FERC. In February 2022, the FERC released their final Environmental Impact Statement (EIS) on the dam's removal, and the dam was slated for removal in 2024. Copco 2 was demolished in 2023.

On January 23, 2024, the drawdown of water and sediment from Copco Lake was initiated via a detonation at the foot of Copco Number 1 Dam. The lake was expected to take three to four weeks to fully drain, at which point crews will plant native vegetation along the emerged riverbank. This was the last of the four dams to be breached as part of the Klamath River Renewal Project. Removal of the dam structure began in March 2024.

== Climate ==
Climate data for Copco Dam #1, California, 1991–2020 normals
Month	Jan	Feb	Mar	Apr	May	Jun	Jul	Aug	Sep	Oct	Nov	Dec	Year
Mean daily maximum °F (°C)	48.1 (8.9)	53.4 (11.9)	58.4 (14.7)	64.2 (17.9)	73.8 (23.2)	82.0 (27.8)	92.9 (33.8)	92.9 (33.8)	85.2 (29.6)	70.0 (21.1)	55.6 (13.1)	46.8 (8.2)	68.6 (20.3)
Daily mean °F (°C)	37.3 (2.9)	41.1 (5.1)	45.3 (7.4)	49.5 (9.7)	57.8 (14.3)	65.3 (18.5)	74.3 (23.5)	74.1 (23.4)	66.9 (19.4)	54.4 (12.4)	43.7 (6.5)	36.4 (2.4)	53.8 (12.1)
Mean daily minimum °F (°C)	26.5 (−3.1)	28.7 (−1.8)	32.2 (0.1)	34.9 (1.6)	41.9 (5.5)	48.5 (9.2)	55.7 (13.2)	55.3 (12.9)	48.6 (9.2)	38.7 (3.7)	31.9 (−0.1)	26.1 (−3.3)	39.1 (3.9)
Average precipitation inches (mm)	3.37 (86)	2.28 (58)	2.01 (51)	1.69 (43)	1.40 (36)	0.90 (23)	0.47 (12)	0.25 (6.4)	0.48 (12)	1.39 (35)	2.68 (68)	3.51 (89)	20.43 (519.4)
Average snowfall inches (cm)	4.7 (12)	2.7 (6.9)	0.6 (1.5)	0.6 (1.5)	0.00 (0.00)	0.00 (0.00)	0.00 (0.00)	0.00 (0.00)	0.00 (0.00)	0.0 (0.0)	1.5 (3.8)	4.4 (11)	14.5 (36.7)
Source: NOAA

== Recreation ==
The lake was used for kayaking, fishing, swimming, windsurfing, power boating, and sailing. The surrounding area had facilities for picnicking and hiking. In the summer months, the lake often experienced large blooms of toxic cyanobacteria rendering the water unsafe for human contact or consumption.

== Dams ==
=== Copco Number 1 Dam ===
Copco Number 1 Dam
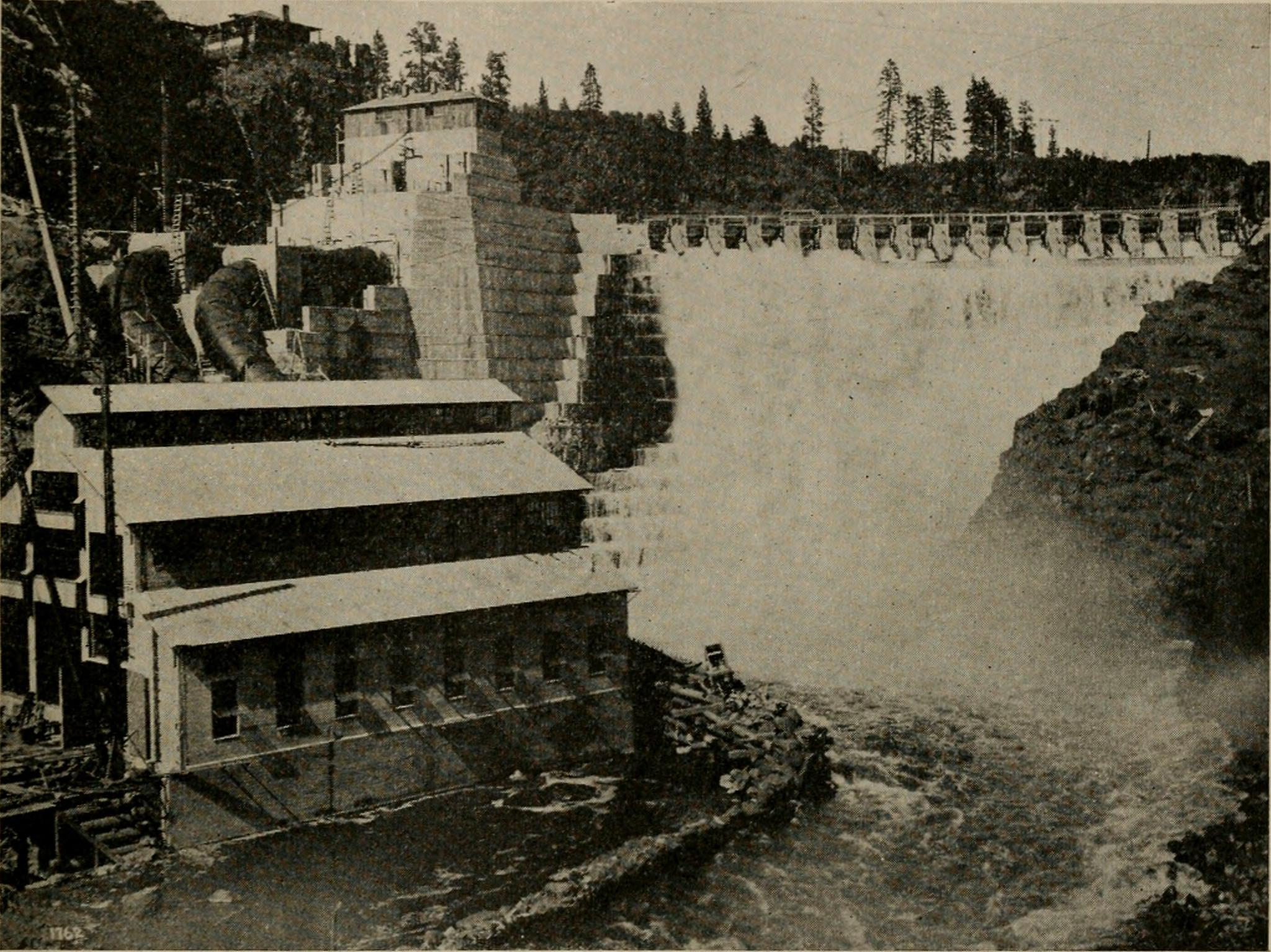
- Interactive map of Copco Number 1 Dam
- Country: United States
- Location: Siskiyou County, California
- Coordinates: 41°58′48″N 122°20′04″W
- Opening date: 1922
- Owner: PacifiCorp

Dam and spillways
- Type of dam: Gravity
- Impounds: Klamath River
- Height: 132 feet (40 m)
- Length: 415 feet (126 m)
- Elevation at crest: 2,613 feet (796 m)
- Width (crest): 9 feet (2.7 m)
- Dam volume: 70,312 cubic yards (53,757 m^{3})

Reservoir
- Creates: Copco Reservoir
- Total capacity: 77,000 acre-feet (95,000,000 m^{3})
- Catchment area: 4,300 square miles (11,000 km^{2})
- Maximum length: 3 miles (4.8 km)
- Maximum width: 1,200 yards (1,100 m)

Copco Number 1 Dam (National ID CA00323) was a gravity dam 415 feet (126 m) long and 132 feet (40 m) high, with 19.5 feet (5.9 m) of freeboard. PacifiCorp owned the dam prior to its transfer to the Klamath River Renewal Corporation in 2022. The dam was demolished in September 2024 as part of the Klamath River Renewal Project.

=== Copco Number 2 Dam ===
Copco Number 2 Dam was a gated diversion dam located just below Dam No. 1. The dam diverted most of the flow of the river, about 2,400 to 2,500 cu ft/s (68 to 71 m^{3}/s), through a flume and tunnels to a 27-megawatt powerhouse 1.5 miles (2.4 km) downstream, on the upstream end of Iron Gate Reservoir. The diversion bypassed a canyon section of the Klamath River that historically consisted of some steep rapids. The dam was required to maintain a minimum release of 10 cu ft/s (0.28 m^{3}/s) to prevent this stretch from being entirely dewatered. Because it had no effective storage capacity, Dam No. 2 depended entirely on the regulated flows released from Copco Lake. The dam was demolished in 2023 during the Klamath River Renewal Project.

== See also ==
- List of dams and reservoirs in California
- List of lakes in California
