= John C. Boyle Dam =

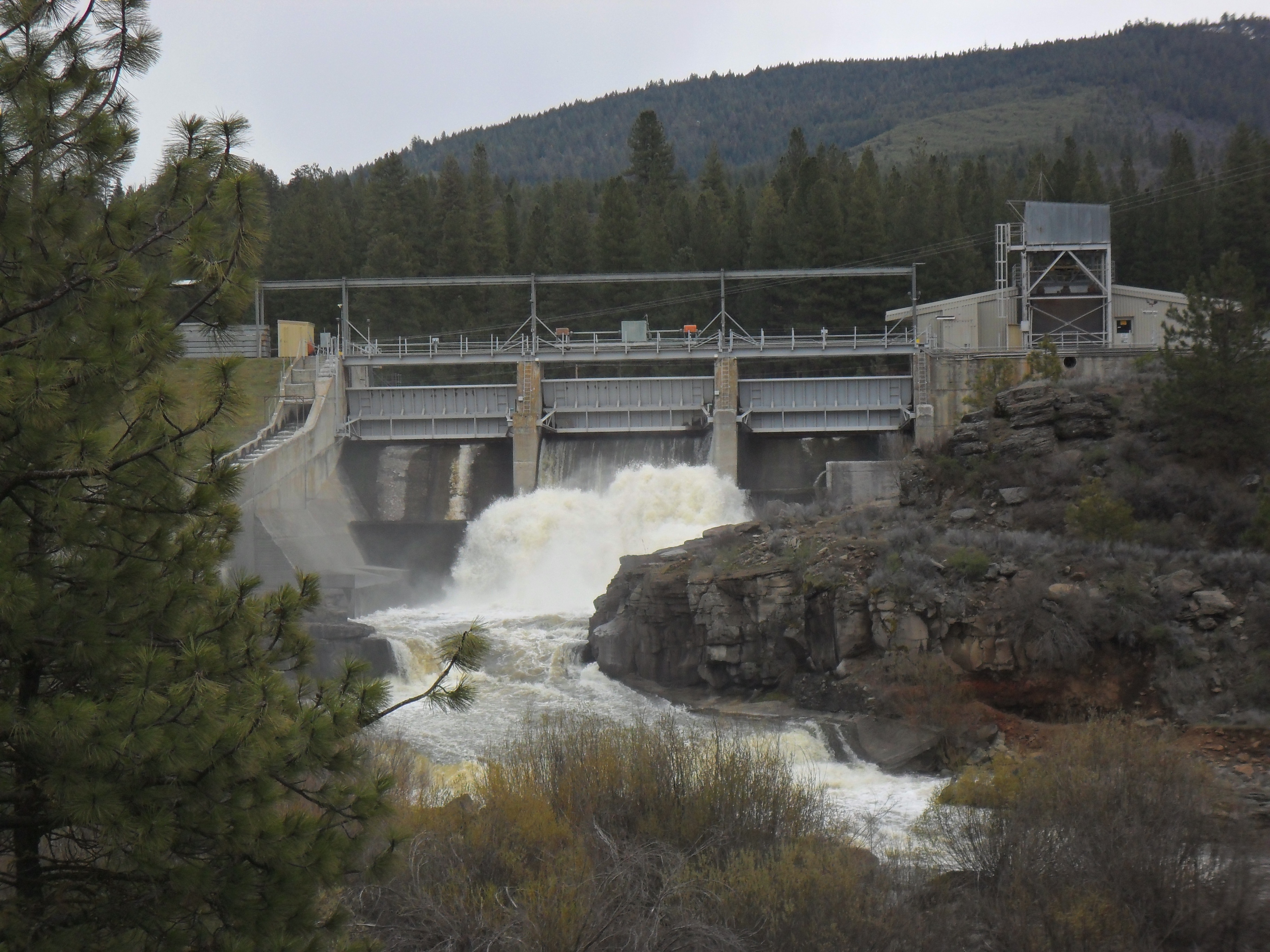
- John C. Boyle Dam, floodgate open.
- Interactive map of John C. Boyle Dam
- Location: Klamath County, Oregon, U.S.
- Coordinates: 42.123476°N 122.048345°W
- Construction began: 1956–1958; 68 years ago

Dam and spillways
- Impounds: Klamath River
- Height: 68 feet (21 m)
- Length: 714.3 feet (217.7 m)

The John C. Boyle Dam was a hydroelectric dam located in southern Oregon, United States. It was on the upper Klamath River, south (downstream) of Keno, and about 12 miles (19 km) north of the California border. Originally developed and known as Big Bend, the John C. Boyle dam and powerhouse complex was re-dedicated to honor the pioneer hydroelectric engineer who was responsible for the design of virtually all of the Klamath Hydroelectric Project.

The Boyle Diversion Dam included several sections (earth-fill, concrete gravity, intake and spillway) that combined to form an overall crest length of 714.3 feet (217.7 m) with a height of 68 feet (21 m). The concrete spillway portion contained three gates and formed the John C. Boyle Reservoir. Fish screens, fish ladder, and related features were also present at the site.

The dam produced power at peak times, meaning sometimes it produces electricity and returns water to the river; other times only a small amount of water is returned to the river. This causes a "bathtub" ring effect downstream of the plant's turbines.

The John C. Boyle Dam is one of four on the Klamath River that was removed under the Klamath Economic Restoration Act. As of February 2016, the states of Oregon and California, the dam owners, federal regulators and other parties reached an agreement to remove all four dams by the year 2020, pending approval by the Federal Energy Regulatory Commission (FERC). As of October 2020, negotiations stalled. As of February 25, 2022, the FERC released their final Environmental Impact Statement (EIS) on the dam's removal. The dam was removed in 2024. The social movement to Un-Dam the Klamath had been ongoing for 20 years.

It was named after John C. Boyle (1899–1979), who was vice president, general manager, and long-time chief engineer of the California Oregon Power Company (COPCO), a privately held utility that served southern Oregon and portions of northern California.

== See also ==
- List of lakes in Oregon
- Klamath River
