= List of freshwater fishes of Oregon =

The following list of freshwater fish species and subspecies known to occur in the U.S. state of Oregon is primarily taken from "Inland Fishes of Washington" by Richard S. Wydoski and Richard R. Whitney (2003), but some species and subspecies have been added from the Oregon Department of Fish and Wildlife (ODFW) website. Some scientific names have been updated or corrected. Asterisks denote introduced fishes. 108 species and subspecies are listed, 33 of them introduced. The list includes several anadromous species, and seven normally marine species–starry flounder, staghorn sculpin, saddleback gunnel, Pacific herring, topsmelt, surf smelt, and shiner perch–that are occasionally found in fresh water.

== Petromyzontiformes ==
=== Family Petromyzontidae ===
- Pacific lamprey, Entosphenus tridentatus
- River lamprey, Lampetra ayresii
- Pit-Klamath brook lamprey, Lampetra lethophaga
- Western brook lamprey, Lampetra richardsoni

== Acipenseriformes ==
=== Family Acipenseridae ===
- Green sturgeon, Acipenser medirostris
- White sturgeon, Acipenser transmontanus

== Atheriniformes ==
=== Family Atherinidae ===
- Topsmelt, Atherinops affinis

== Clupeiformes ==
=== Family Clupeidae ===
- American shad*, Dorosoma sapidissima
- Pacific herring, Clupea pallasi

== Cypriniformes ==
=== Family Catostomidae ===
- Bridgelip sucker, Catostomus columbianus
- Largescale sucker, Catostomus macrocheilus
- Sacramento sucker, Catostomus occidentalis
- Mountain sucker, Catostomus platyrhynchus
- Klamath smallscale sucker, Catostomus rimiculus
- Klamath largescale sucker, Catostomus snyderi
- Tahoe sucker, Catostomus tahoensis
- Warner sucker, Catostomus warneri
- Shortnose sucker, Chasmistes brevirostris
- Lost River sucker, Deltistes luxatus

=== Family Cobitidae ===
- Weatherfish*, Misgurnus anguillicaudatus

=== Family Cyprinidae ===
- Chiselmouth, Acrocheilus alutaceus
- Goldfish*, Carassius auratus
- Lake chub, Couseius plumbeus
- Grass carp*, Ctenopharyngodon idella
- Common carp*, Cyprinus carpio
- Tui chub, Gila bicolor
  - Hutton Springs tui chub, Gila bicolor ssp.
- Borax Lake chub, Gila boraxobius
- Blue chub, Gila coerulea
- California roach, Hesperoleucus symmetricus
- Peamouth, Mylocheilus caurinus
- Oregon chub, Oregonichthys crameri
- Umpqua chub, Oregonichthys kalawatseti
- Northern pikeminnow, Ptychocheilus oregonensis
- Umpqua pikeminnow, Ptychocheilus umpquae
- Longnose dace, Rhinichthys cataractae
- Umpqua dace, Rhinichthys evermanni
- Leopard dace, Rhinichthys falcatus
- Umatilla dace, Rhinichthys umatilla
- Speckled dace, Rhinichthys osculus
  - Foskett specked dace, Rhinichthys osculus ssp.
- Redside shiner, Richardsonius balteatus
- Lahontan redside shiner, Richardsonius egregius
- Golden shiner*, Notemigonus crysoleucas

== Cyprinodontiformes ==
=== Family Fundulidae ===
- Banded killifish*, Fundulus diaphanus
- Rainwater killifish*, Lucania parva

=== Family Poeciliidae ===
- Mosquitofish*, Gambusia affinis

== Perciformes ==
=== Family Centrarchidae ===
- Sacramento perch*, Archoplites interruptus
- Green sunfish*, Lepomis cyanellus
- Bluegill*, Lepomis macrochirus
- Pumpkinseed*, Lepomis gibbosus
- Warmouth*, Lepomis gulosus
- Redear sunfish*, Lepomis microlophus
- Smallmouth bass*, Micropterus dolomieui
- Largemouth bass*, Micropterus salmoides
- White crappie*, Pomoxis annularis
- Black crappie*, Pomoxis nigromaculatus

=== Family Embiotocidae ===
- Shiner perch, Cymatogaster aggregata

=== Family Percidae ===
- Yellow perch*, Perca flavescens
- Walleye*, Sander vitreus

=== Family Moronidae ===
- Striped bass*, Morone saxatilis

=== Family Pholidae ===
- Saddleback gunnel, Pholis ornata

== Percopsiformes ==
=== Family Percopsidae ===
- Sand roller, Percopsis transmontanus

== Gadiformes ==
=== Family Gadidae ===
- Burbot, Lota lota

== Gasterosteiformes ==
=== Family Gasterosteidae ===
- Three-spine stickleback, Gasterosteus aculeatus

== Osmeriformes ==
=== Family Osmeridae ===
- Surf smelt, Hypomesus pretiosus
- Longfin smelt, Spirinchus thaleichthys
- Eulachon, Thaleichthys pacificus

== Pleuronectiformes ==
=== Family Pleuronectidae ===
- Starry flounder, Planichthys stellatus

== Salmoniformes ==
=== Family Salmonidae ===
- Chinook salmon, Oncorhynchus tshawytscha
- Coho salmon, Oncorhynchus kisutch
- Chum salmon, Oncorhynchus keta
- Sockeye salmon/Kokanee, Oncorhynchus nerka
- Pink salmon, Oncorhynchus gorbuscha
- Golden trout*, Oncorhynchus mykiss aguabonita
- Rainbow trout Oncorhynchus mykiss
  - Columbia River redband trout, O. m. gairdneri (includes anadromous steelhead)
  - Coastal rainbow trout, O. m. irideus (includes anadromous steelhead)
  - Great Basin redband trout, O. m. newberri
- Cutthroat trout, Oncorhynchus clarki
  - Coastal cutthroat trout, Oncorhynchus clarki clarki
  - Lahontan cutthroat trout, Oncorhynchus clarki henshawi
  - Westslope cutthroat trout, Oncorhynchus clarki lewisi
- Mountain whitefish, Prosopium williamsoni
- Atlantic salmon*, Salmo salar
- Brown trout*, Salmo trutta
- Bull trout, Salvelinus confluentus
- Brook trout*, Salvelinus fontinalis
- Lake trout*, Salvelinus namaycush
- Arctic grayling*, Thymallus arcticus

== Scorpaeniformes ==
=== Family Cottidae ===
- Coastrange sculpin, Cottus aleuticus
- Prickly sculpin, Cottus asper
- Mottled sculpin, Cottus bairdi
- Paiute sculpin, Cottus beldingi
- Shorthead sculpin, Cottus confusus
- Riffle sculpin, Cottus gulosus
- Marbled sculpin, Cottus klamathensis
- Margined sculpin, Cottus marginatus
- Reticulate sculpin, Cottus perplexus
- Pit sculpin, Cottus pitensis
- Klamath Lake sculpin, Cottus princeps
- Torrent sculpin, Cottus rhotheus
- Slender sculpin, Cottus tenius
- Pacific staghorn sculpin, Leptocottus armatus

== Siluriformes ==
=== Family Ictaluridae ===
- Black bullhead*, Ameiurus melas
- Yellow bullhead*, Ameiurus natalis
- Brown bullhead*, Ameiurus nebulosus
- White catfish*, Ictalurus catus
- Blue catfish*, Ictalurus furcatus
- Channel catfish*, Ictalurus punctatus
- Tadpole madtom*, Noturus gyrinus
- Flathead catfish*, Pylodictis olivaris
