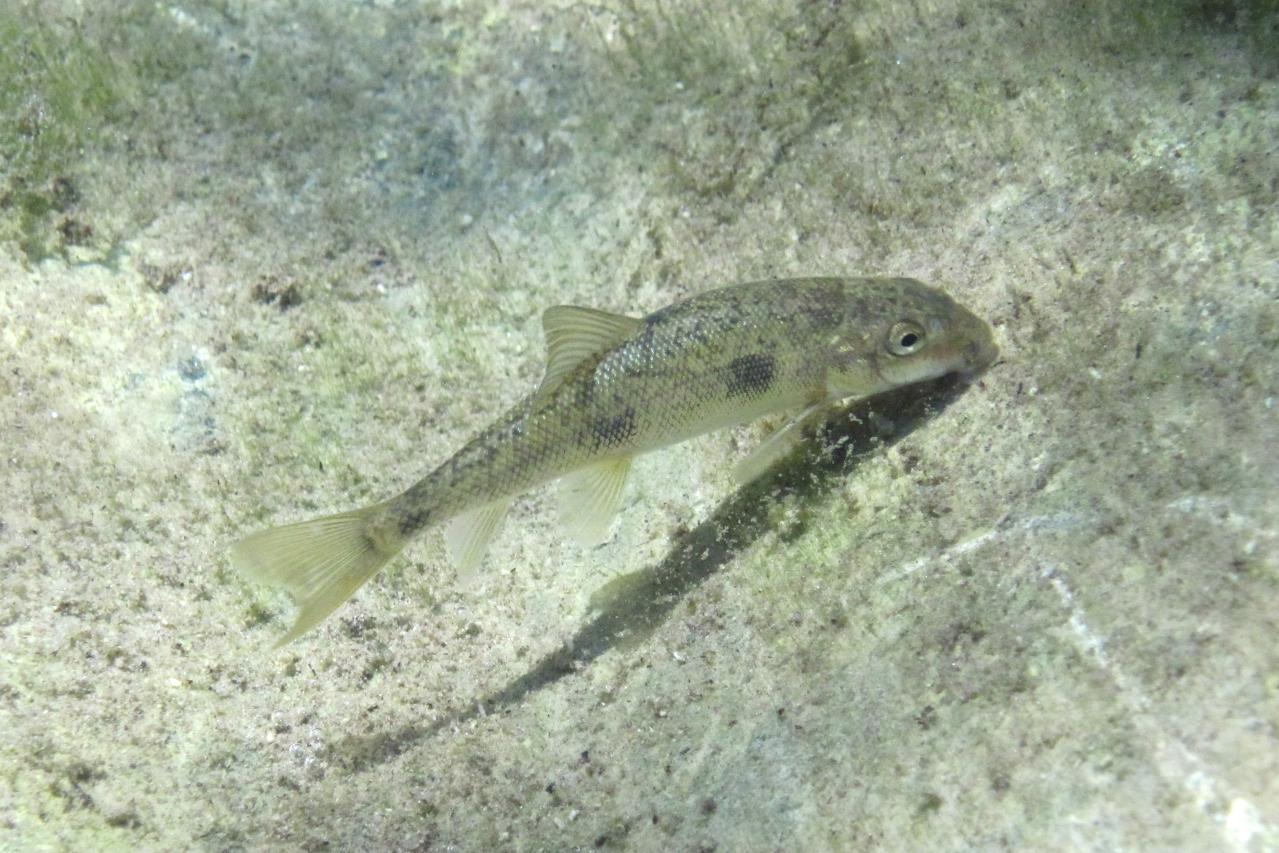

Conservation status
- Least Concern (IUCN 3.1)

Scientific classification
- Kingdom: Animalia
- Phylum: Chordata
- Class: Actinopterygii
- Division: Teleostei
- Order: Cypriniformes
- Family: Catostomidae
- Genus: Catostomus
- Species: C. occidentalis

Binomial name
- Catostomus occidentalis Ayres, 1854

= Sacramento sucker =

Species of fish

The Sacramento sucker (Catostomus occidentalis) is a species of ray-finned fish in the family Catostomidae. It is primarily found in California with some populations extending into Oregon and Nevada. They inhabit a diverse range of habitats from headwater streams to deep lakes to estuaries. The Sacramento sucker scientific name Catostomus occidentalis describes its morphology and origin, respectively, being an inferiorly mouthed (Catostomus) western (occidentalis) species; the name Western sucker has also been used.

== Species description ==
An adult Sacramento sucker representative coloration is a brown or black upperpart and yellow gold or white underpart. At juvenile stage the fish is gray, darker on its dorsal plane, and several spots show on body are present. Other field marks include a conically slender head with a terminally located mouth and medium to large sized lips. The lips are a key characteristic of the fish. Its lips are covered with sensitive papillae, largest in the middle rows. The upper lip and lower lip respectively have 7 rows and 9 rows of papillae. Anterior features include eyes located at the posterior half section of the head, and a minimal number of small gill rakers. Ventral fins such as the pectoral and pelvic, both paired, and an anal fin are present. The fins are geared for stability and steering. The sucker fish has the largest sized scales at its posterior half with a dorsal fin ranging from 0.50-0.53 millimeters in length. Other key anatomical features consist of one possessing a straight lateral line, a homocercal caudal fin, and 12 to 13 rays. Typical size is indicative of specific habitat, so a range of size exists. Determined by annual report, body length ranges from 12-87 millimeters, averaged at 40 millimeters. Male and female suckers grow at the same rate, but the female is the largest after full development.

In 1973, John D. Hopkirk, ichthyologist and emeritus professor of Sonoma State determined the species to be endemic to the Sacramento-San Joaquin province and identified several subspecies. These subspecies included Central Valley C. occidentalis occidentalis, Eel River C. occidentalis humboldtianusi, C. occidentalis lacusanserinus of the Columbia River system, and C. occidentalis mniotilus of the Monterey Bay. Additional subspecies were later identified in Clear Lake, Russian River, and Tomales Bay. Over a decade later, in 1987, California Fish and Game (now recognized as California Fish and Wildlife) studied the morphological differentiation of subspecies within the Catostomus occidentalis species. They determined subspecies populations by region do not remarkably differ except for the Pajaro sucker (C. o. mniotilus) which differs in lateral line scales, scales from the lateral line, and scale rows before the dorsal compared to other relatives.

The Sacramento Sucker is host to several distinctive trematode flukes which have been placed in the Lissorchidae family and Triaganodistomum genus.

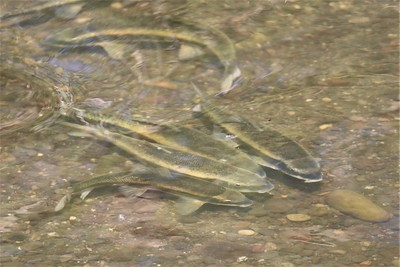
Sacramento sucker fish in Santa Rosa Creek, Sonoma County, California

== Distribution ==
While a native fish to the California Central Valley, the sucker fish can also be found in the state of Oregon. Hopkirk's Endemism in Fishes of the Clear Lake region of Central California publication for University of California Publication in Zoology, explains sucker species morphological features such as scale density varies upon geographical distribution due to hydrographic patterns. For example, the scales of suckers are found in its subspecies relative C. occidentalis mniotilus versus the fine scales of Catostomus occidentalis. The geographic range of the species spans central and northern California. More specifically, drainages of Sacramento-San Joaquin, streams and reservoirs of Oregon Goose Lake upper basin and upper Kern River drainage in San Joaquin and Tulare area as well as coastal spots such as Tomales Bay, and Mad, Bear, Eel, Navarro, Russian, Pajaro, and Salinas River. Suckers inhabit deep pools, undercut banks, or clear streams of river ecosystems from cold to warm temperatures (20-25 degree Celsius). The species occupies elevation zones ranging from 200-600 meters.

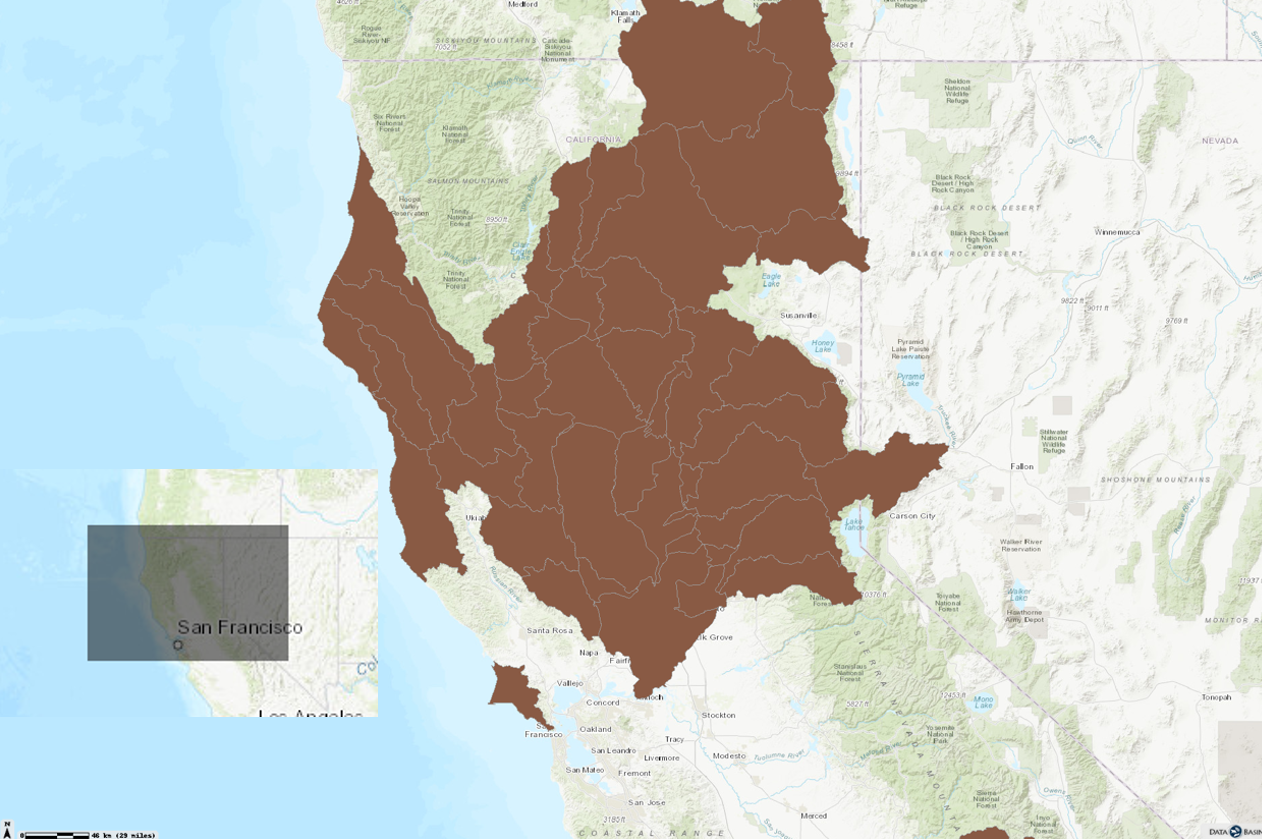
Map of Sacramento sucker (Catostomus occidentalis) distribution for current occupation within historical range

== Biology ==
The species initiates reproduction under changes in water temperature and water flow. The ideal parameters include warm water temperature and an increase in water discharge. Due to the preference for reproduction the fish is expected to spawn in the spring season. The reproduction is most successful in wet years. The spawn time is the fourth, fifth, or sixth year of life and is linked to migration to a river or reservoir; female spawns with 2-7 males. Age ranges from 7-30 years, depending on the residential location. Growth rates are variable due to environmental factors due to temperature of water. Though, the rate of growth decreases as the fish ages. During early life stages, ages four to six years, the fish can exhibit a fork length of 200-320 millimeters. From juvenile to adult stage, the growth is closely linked to where individuals live in general. For example, the average upper Merced River sucker was 47 millimeters for standard length (SL) whereas the lower Merced River sucker was 80 millimeters SL. The sucker feeds on algae, detritus, and small invertebrates from bottom substate using their vacuum-like lips to suck in food; feeding is most active at night.

The Sacramento sucker are strong swimmers overall using strategic sources for water flow and can be found in zones of channel margin or debris. In a 2006 study, researchers captured the strategic movement upon a springtime water release from the Camanche Dam study using radio telemetry. The active dam is in Mokelumne River, California. Results from the study shows the species used the controlled release of water for a boost of speed to travel more distance compared to pre-release water periods. The sucker traveled more than 8100 meters up and downstream. In pre-release water periods it travels significantly less than 550 meters. In addition to water flow, changes of water temperature alter the movement for Sacramento suckers. A 1998 study conducted by Christopher Myrick and Joseph Cech, Jr. recorded the aerobic swim velocity of the sucker and other California stream fish. Study results reveal how the Sacramento sucker did not respond remarkably well to external change. Instead, it was mostly stationary whilst maintaining a roaming nature at the bottom of experimental chamber floor. This behavior was observed as their way to "resist downstream displacement". The fish only made subtle changes to critical holding velocity to manage experimental temperatures at a pace between 0.47-0.51 meters per second.

An experiment in 2003 was performed to explore potential genetic variation among native Sacramento sucker populations in Central Valley of California from pesticide exposure over time It was determined that downstream population had higher genetic diversity compared to upstream populations based on gene flow but not pesticide exposure. Overall, markers for altered genes are minimal or not present, so the contamination does not harm populations or the volume of pesticide in run-offs is negligible.

== Case studies ==
A 1982 study sought to determine if rainbow trout (Salmo gardneri) and the Sacramento sucker were in competition. Researchers measured microhabitat utilization of the species involved in three California streams. The results show there is no competition between the two, in fact, the separation was significant. Due to the suckers spatial preference, staying close to the bottom substrate, makes contact virtually none with trout who occupy water column. Thus, microhabitats are not hugely crossed over with similar size class fish.

An experiment in 2003 was performed to explore potential genetic variation among native Sacramento sucker populations in Central Valley of California from pesticide exposure over time It was determined that downstream population had higher genetic diversity compared to upstream populations based on gene flow but not pesticide exposure. Overall, markers for altered genes are minimal or not present, so the contamination does not harm populations or the volume of pesticide in run-offs is negligible.

Northern California bald eagles (Haliaeetus leucocephalus) prey on native and introduced freshwater fish species including Catostomus occidentalis. The sucker is a common food item for Bald eagles located in bird impoundments adjacent the Pit River and American River.

The archived tissue samples of the Asian clam (Corbicula fluminea), caddisfly (Hydropsyche sp.), as well as the Sacramento sucker (Catostomus occidentalis) were involved in a carbon and nitrogen isotope signature study. The goal of the study was to determine if the archival tissue can provide isotopic signatures. Moreover, the analysis did work and only presented an error of depletion onto the output of signature from formalin fixation.

The advancement of molecular biological technique, amplified length polymorphism (AFLP) and single strand conformation polymorphism (SSCP) technologies, have been applied to the subspecies identification of Catostomus subspecies in the Klamath River Basin. The research will help with species identification for hybridized individuals, and across subspecies populations.

== Conservation status ==
According to the IUCN Red List, the Sacramento sucker has a status of least concern. The status for the species was last assessed on 27 October 2011. However, the sucker was recognized as an endangered fish previously in 1988. Currently, four subspecies populations are endangered, the Klamath largescale (Catostomus snyderi) and smallscale suckers (Catostomus rimiculus) and federally endangered shortnose (Chasmistes brevirostris) and Lost River suckers (Deltistes luxatus), all native to the Klamath River Basin, Oregon. Moyle's Inland Fishes of California expresses the fish "thrives despite massive changes to California's waterways." The Ajumawi tribe harvests the Sacramento sucker - a staple of their diet.

== Relationship with humans ==
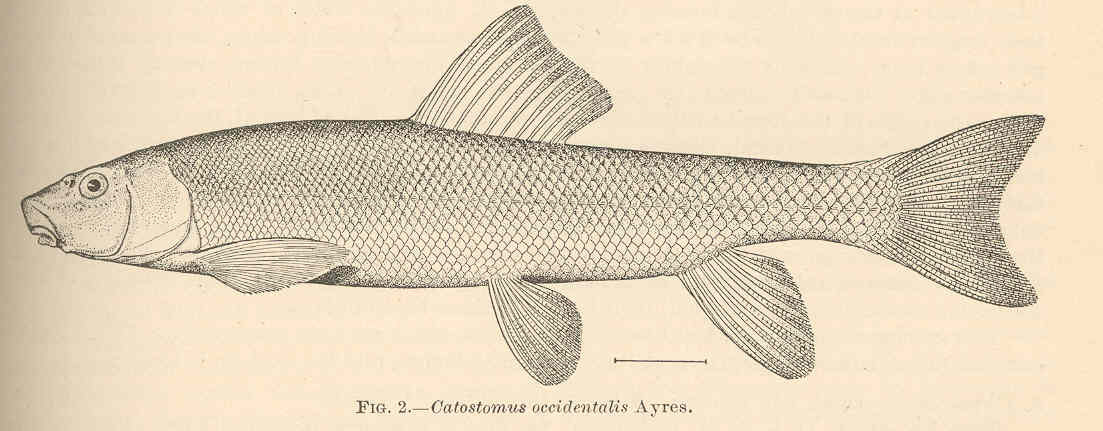
Catostomus occidentalis

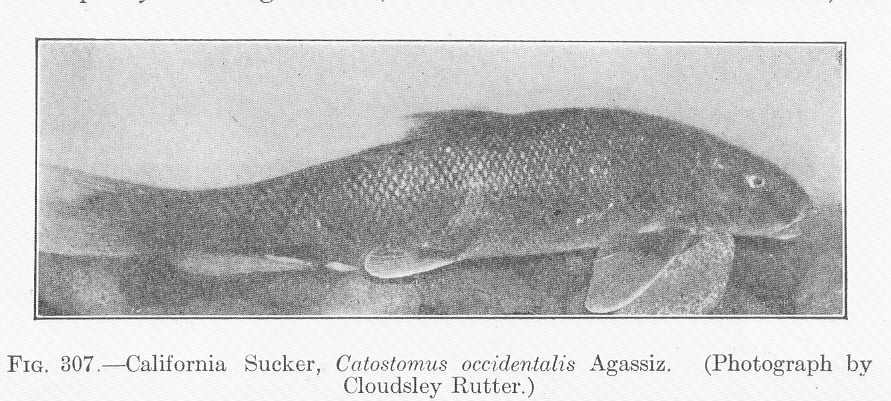
Catostomus occidentalis

The Sacramento sucker is an important food fish for the Native Americans of California. In particular, the Achomawi band of the Pit River relied on the Sacramento sucker, particularly after salmon began disappearing from the river in the 1860s due to pollution from lumber mills and the eventual construction of hydroelectric dams. Sacramento suckers provided an important part of the Achomawi's diet up until the 1950s and the remains of stone traps used to catch the fish in midwinter can still be found in the river. The International Game Fish Association all tackle world record stands at 7 lb 10 oz (3.5 kg) taken from Lake Palmdale near Palmdale, California. The previous record stood at 4 lb 8 oz (2.0 kg) taken from the Stanislaus River near Escalon, California.

At a San Francisco fish market, the Sacramento sucker fish was first described by American ichthyologist William Orville Ayres in 1854
