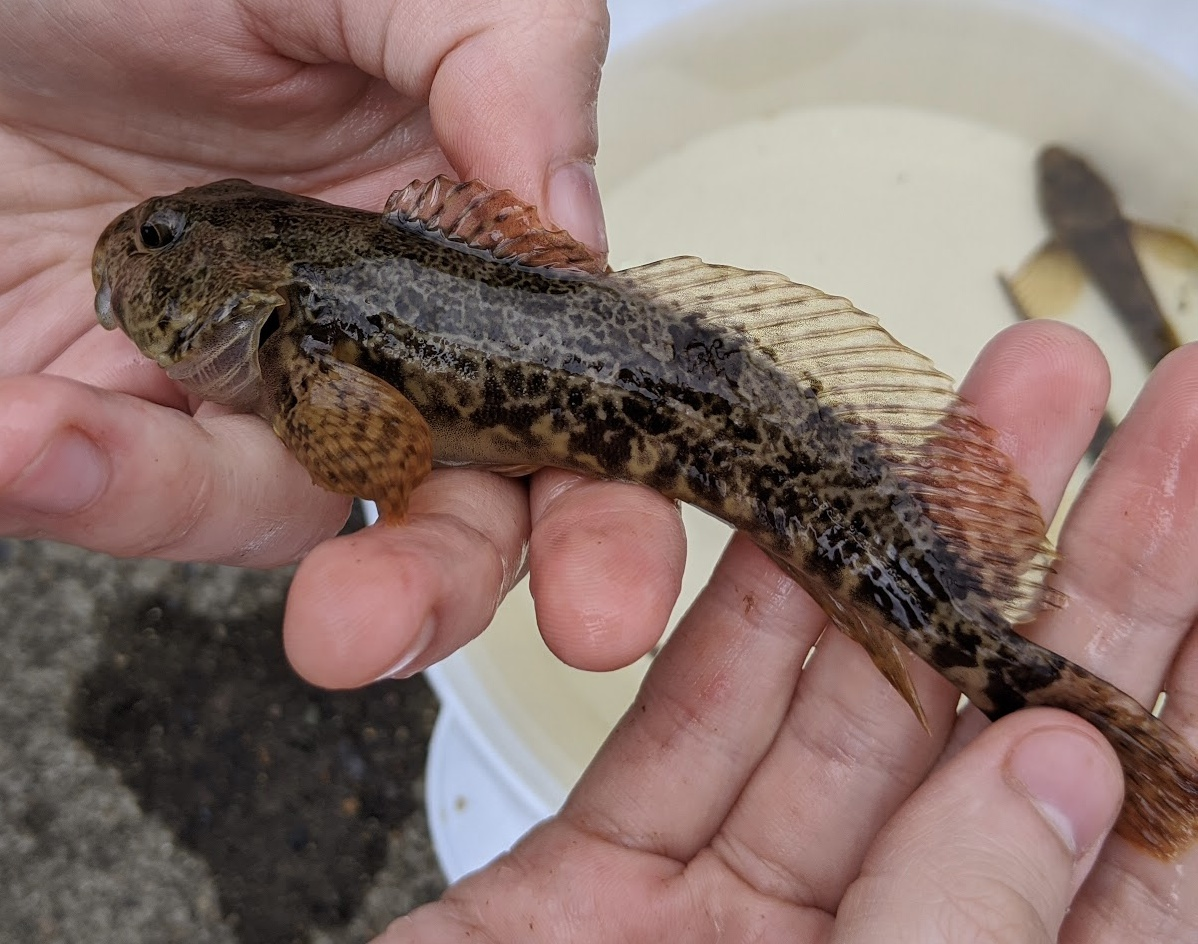

Conservation status
- Least Concern (IUCN 3.1)

Scientific classification
- Kingdom: Animalia
- Phylum: Chordata
- Class: Actinopterygii
- Order: Perciformes
- Suborder: Cottoidei
- Family: Cottidae
- Genus: Cottus
- Species: C. asper

Binomial name
- Cottus asper Richardson, 1836

= Prickly sculpin =

Species of fish

The prickly sculpin (Cottus asper) is a species of ray-finned fish belonging to the family Cottidae, the typical sculpins. It is native to the river drainages of the Pacific Slope of North America from Seward, Alaska south to the Ventura River of Southern California. It extends east of the Continental Divide in the Peace River of British Columbia. It has also been introduced to several reservoirs in Southern California.

== Description ==
This fish can reach about 30 centimeters in length, but it is usually smaller, often around 4–10 cm in length with a large head and wide fan-like pectoral fins. In California, sculpins reach 20 cm in length. It is mature at 2 to 4 years of age, and its maximum lifespan is around 7 years. The prickly sculpin camouflages with muted tones it is brown, gray, or olive green on its upper parts and white or yellowish ventrally. There are dark spots or bars on the back and dark bars on most of the fins. The breeding male is darker in color than the female and nonbreeding male. Both sexes develop an orange coloration along the edge of the first dorsal fin during breeding. The body of the fish is prickly with spines that can pierce bare skin. Inland-dwelling fish tend to be more prickly compared to those at the coast.

== Biology ==
There are two main forms of the species. The inland form lives in lakes, while the coastal form lives in rivers and swims down into brackish estuaries to breed. A catadromous species, it is tolerant of high and low salinities. It is generally a bottom-dwelling species. It is nocturnal, feeding at night.

The diet of the fish includes water invertebrates, insects and their larvae, salmon eggs, fish larvae, especially those of the Sacramento sucker (Catostomus occidentalis occidentalis), and zooplankton, especially Daphnia spp. Larger sculpins eat small fish, frogs, and molluscs. The adults are known to cannibalize the juveniles. The prickly sculpin lives and hunts at the bottom of tide pools and streams. Prickly Sculpins catch their prey by darting at the prey.

In its habitat it lives alongside its relative, the coastrange sculpin (Cottus aleuticus), which is quite similar to it in terms of morphology and behavior. It can also be found with the three-spined stickleback (Gasterosteus aculeatus), steelhead trout (Oncorhynchus mykiss), Klamath small-scale sucker (Catostomus rimiculus), coastal cutthroat trout (Oncorhynchus clarki clarki), Chinook salmon (O. tshawytscha), and coho salmon (O. kisutch). Sculpins avoid predators by hiding along the bottom of the streams under rocks and wood.

Spawning season can extend from February to June. The male creates a nest under debris such as logs or garbage, and the female lays many eggs, from a few hundred up to 11,000. The male guards the nest. He may breed with more than one female per season.

== Distribution ==
This fish is common in most of its range, becoming quite abundant in the summer when recruitment occurs and the previous season's juveniles join the population. Sculpins reside in cold-water streams. Prickly sculpins can be found in Pacific Northwest streams. While it is native to many waterways in California and found all the way up to Alaska, it represents an introduced species in some Southern California lakes, rivers, and tributaries, such as the Santa Clara River, the Santa Ana River, Irvine Lake, and Big Bear Lake. It occurs in reservoirs such as Pyramid Lake. It was likely introduced to many of these places from farther north via the California Aqueduct.

== Conservation status ==
Prickly sculpins are not currently listed under the Endangered Species Act. Sculpins are minimally concerning under the Endangered Species Act.

== Uses ==
The fish is said to be edible by humans, at least the larger individuals. It also makes a good bait fish.
