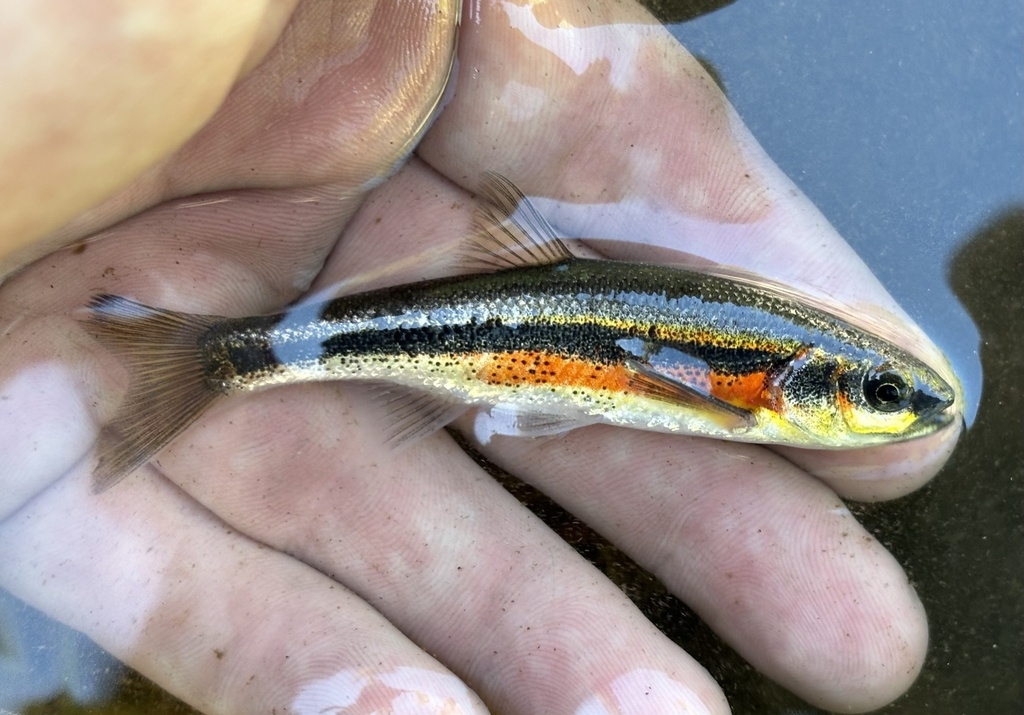

Conservation status
- Least Concern (IUCN 3.1)

Scientific classification
- Kingdom: Animalia
- Phylum: Chordata
- Class: Actinopterygii
- Order: Cypriniformes
- Family: Leuciscidae
- Subfamily: Pogonichthyinae
- Genus: Richardsonius
- Species: R. egregius

Binomial name
- Richardsonius egregius (Girard, 1858)

Synonyms
- Tigoma egregia Girard, 1858; Gila ardesiaca Cope, 1875; Squalius galtiae Cope, 1883; Phoxinus clevelandi C. H. Eigenmann & Eigenmann, 1889

= Lahontan redside =

Species of fish

The Lahontan Redside (Richardsonius egregius) is a species of freshwater ray-finned fish belonging to the family Leuciscidae - which contains true minnows. The Lahontan Redside inhabits the Great Basin in Eastern California, Western Nevada and they very southern tip of Oregon.

They are opportunistic omnivores, preying on whatever they can find in their alpine river or lake habitats. Lahontan Redsides are an important part of their food web serving as prey for many predatory bird and fish species.

== Description ==
Lahontan Redsides are noted for their breeding colors, consisting of a bright red stripe with a yellow border on each side. Males are noted to have a darker red stripe when breeding compared to females. When they are not spawning, the stripe is sometimes still visible, however, the red is faded, leaving a gradual transition from the olive-colored back to silvery underside. They are a slender and agile fish. Their dorsal fin has 7–8 rays, while the anal fin has 8–10 rays. Their pectoral fins are somewhat long, the tips reaching nearly to the bases of the pelvic fins. Their tail is deeply forked. They have hooked pharyngeal teeth and small mouths compared to their size. They also have an S-shaped intestine and stubby gill rakers. The max length ranges up to 17 cm, but an 8 cm length is the average of mature adults.

== Range and habitat ==
The Lahontan Redside's native range is the eastern portion of the Sierra Nevada mountain range in California through Western Nevada and the southern tip of Oregon. They are found in most basins in that range. They occupy the Lahontan, Humboldt, Walker, Carson, Truckee, Susan, Quinn and Reese River systems. They are also found in Tahoe, Pyramid, Eagle and Walker Lakes.

Lahontan Redside's have been introduced to multiple drainages and lakes in California in small sub-populations. These small sub-populations were most likely due to bait bucket introduction. Bait bucket introduction refers to anglers using Lahontan Redside's as bait, and then spilling or releasing them into the waterway in which they were fishing. They have been reported in Mill Creek which is at the headwaters of the Rubicon River. They have are also found in Loon Lake, Saddlebag Lake and Buck Lake in California. They have been found in other drainages including the upper Middle Fork Feather River drainage and Warner Creek which is a tributary of the North Fork Feather River. Finally, they were found in multiple tributaries at the top of the Mokelumne River. These tributaries are near the Frenchman and Bear Valley Reservoirs and are called Frenchman Creek, Little Last Chance Creek and Ramelli creek.

Lahontan Redsides are found in many different habitats in their range. The occupy fast moving mountain tributaries, to large rivers and everything in between, preferring areas with rocky bottoms. They are also found in lakes. They prefer to congregate near cover whether that be wharves, boulders, submerged logs or other objects. They occupy all different types of stream niches from fast riffles to slow deep pools. Juveniles prefer slower water and eddies while adults preferring more swift water in the main channel of the river. In lakes they are mostly found around the margins closer to the shore. In Lake Tahoe specifically, they prefer the literate zone, unless water temperature goes below 10 degrees Celsius, sending them to deeper warmer water sometimes as deep as one hundred feet. They are mostly inactive near the rocky bottom. After they hatch young Lahontan Redsides seek quiet water with cover. they will usually make their way to shallow water at the mouth of their small streams. They live under cover of overhanging bushes or other river debris with the company of other minnow species.

== Diet ==
Lahontan Redsides are omnivores. In lakes they eat a variety of surface insects, crustaceans and bottom dwelling larvae. However, in rivers they prey on benthic insects, algae and even in some cases snails, preferring to prey on insects drifting in the rivers current. The benthic insects they prefer are Caddisflies but will also prey on Mayflies, Midges and other insects they come across. They are opportunistic feeders and eat what they can, resulting in them sometimes eating other fish eggs such as the Tahoe Sucker's.

== Predators and threats ==
Lahontan Redside are a food source for many predatory fish that occupy their same range. One of these predatory fish is the threatened Lahontan Cutthroat Trout who occupy almost they exact same range as the Lahontan Redsides. Brown Trout, Lake Trout, Tiger Trout and Rainbow Trout are also known to feed on Lahontan Redsides. The other main predatory fish that preys on the Lahontan Redsides are Largemouth Bass, Smallmouth Bass and the Sacramento Perch. Kingfishers and Black Terns have also been known to prey on Lahontan Redsides.

Lahontan Redside's do not have any apparent threats, and are listed as least concerned on the IUCN Red List.

== Reproduction ==
Lahontan Redsides usually take around three to four years to mature and reach spawning age, however, some become able to spawn at the age of two years. When they have reached maturity and it is the time of year to spawn they develop breeding tubercules on their body and head. Males develop more overall and some on their pectoral fins as well. The Lahontan Redside's spawning season lasts from late May to August when water temperatures are 13 to 24 degrees Celsius. The Lake Tahoe population typically spawns during June and July. The populations east of Lake Tahoe usually spawn earlier from May to June. They look for shallow water, either at lake margins, or in stream pools with sand and gravel bottoms. In lakes such as Lake Tahoe, they sometimes migrate up small tributaries to spawn. To begin the spawning process they form into sporadic swirling groups of 20–100 fish just above the bottom. The actual egg laying and fertilizing consists of subgroups swimming down and pressing themselves on the bottom, the eggs then adhering to the rocks and crevices.

They been known to hybridize with the Gila Bicolor (Tui Chubb) and the Rhinichthys Oculus (Speckled Dace).

== Human uses ==
Lahontan Redsides are allowed to be used as bait in the state of Nevada. They are primarily used as bait for Largemouth Bass. However, they are used as bait for other species that prey on them as well.

== Relatives ==
Lahontan Redside's are very closely related to Richarsonius Balteatus of the Columbia River basin. They are less closely related to eastern minnows of the genus Clinostomus. They are also related to minnows in the genus Gila.

== Other names ==
The Lahontan Redside is referred to by many other unofficial names. The other names consist of Lahontan Redshiner, Lahontan Redside Shiner, Redside Minnow, Redside Bream and Red Striper Shiner. These names all make reference to their breeding colors.
