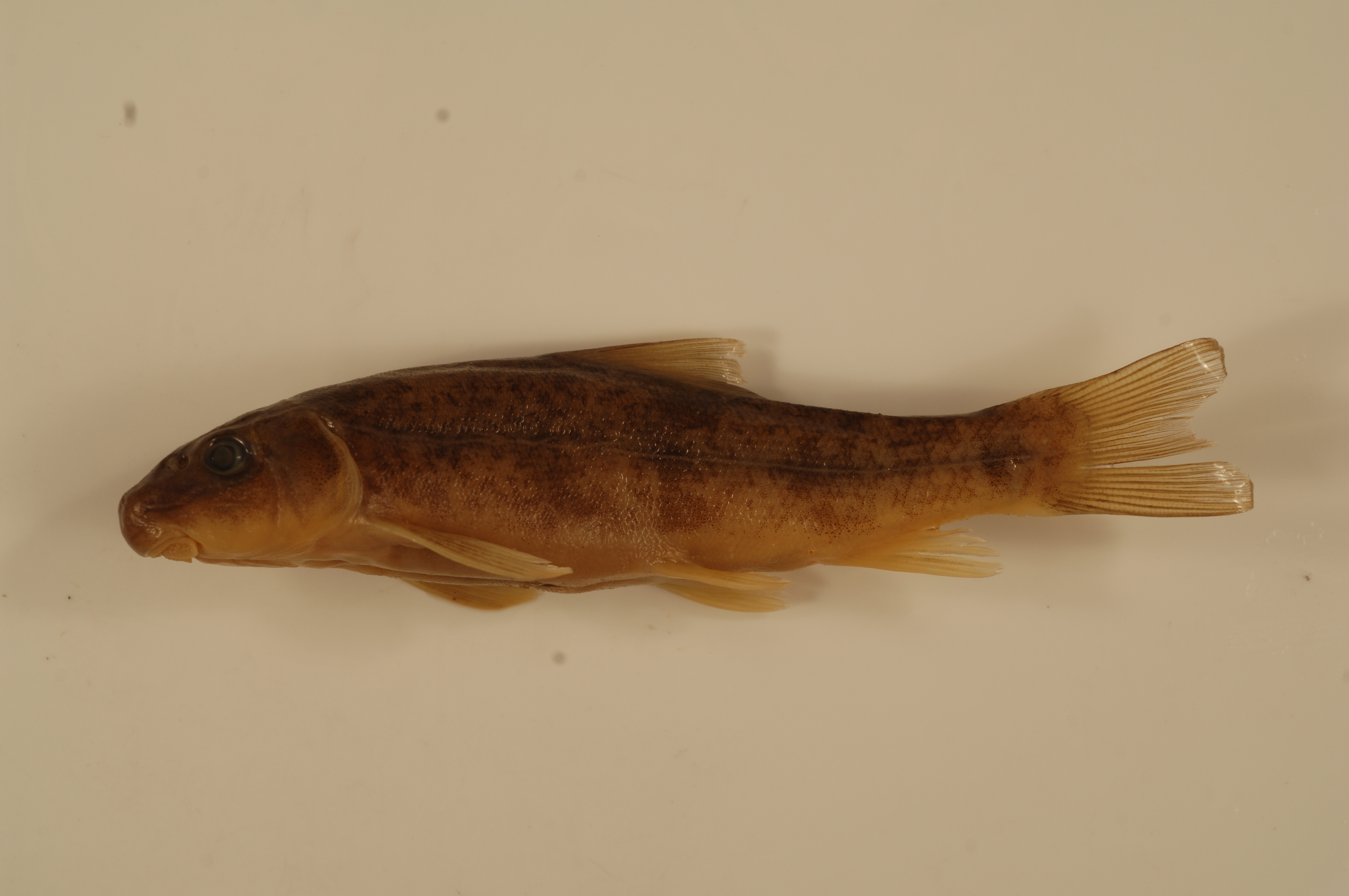

Conservation status
- Least Concern (IUCN 3.1)

Scientific classification
- Kingdom: Animalia
- Phylum: Chordata
- Class: Actinopterygii
- Division: Teleostei
- Order: Cypriniformes
- Family: Catostomidae
- Genus: Catostomus
- Species: C. rimiculus

Binomial name
- Catostomus rimiculus Gilbert and Snyder in Gilbert, 1898

= Klamath smallscale sucker =

Species of fish

The Klamath smallscale sucker (Catostomus rimiculus), also known as the Jenny Creek sucker, is a species of ray-finned fish in the family Catostomidae. It is a freshwater fish that primarily inhabits the Trinity and Klamath River watersheds, as well as the overall region of the Klamath Basin in general. Within the Klamath Basin, they inhabit the area along with three other sucker fish: the Lost River sucker, shortnose sucker, and the Klamath largescale sucker. These fish can vary in length from 35 cm to 50 cm, and usually have a lifespan of around 9-15 years. They often form mixed schools with speckled dace, sculpins, and juvenile steelhead.

A population of the species separated from the Klamath River by a waterfall are called Jenny Creek suckers.

== Distribution ==
The Klamath smallscale sucker is native to the Klamath River basin, where it has been recorded in watersheds from Upper Klamath Lake and the Lost River downstream through the Butte, Shasta, Scott, Salmon, and Lower Klamath watersheds. It also occurs in the Trinity River system including the South Fork Trinity, and in the Rogue River basin of Oregon, including the Upper, Middle, and Lower Rogue and the Applegate watersheds. Unlike the other three Klamath Basin sucker species, which are endemic and restricted to the Klamath Basin, the Klamath smallscale sucker is also found outside it. A population in California’s Smith River is considered introduced, and genetic analysis suggests that six or fewer fish from the Klamath River founded it.

== Relationship with humans ==
Klamath smallscale suckers are listed as a sensitive species of concern in Oregon.Suckers in the Klamath Basin have long been culturally important to the regional tribes and served as a major food source for centuries before European settlement. Today the species is also of some interest to anglers,and the International Game Fish Association all tackle world record for the Klamath smallscale sucker stands at 2 lbs 8 oz taken from the Trinity River near Del Loma, California. Humans may also have influenced the species’ range: Genetic analysis suggests the Klamath Smallscale suckers in California’s Smith River are an introduced population, probably founded by six or fewer fish from the Klamath River.

== Life cycle ==
=== Reproduction ===
Klamath smallscale suckers migrate to tributary streams to reproduce in the spring. Female suckers are able to produce 15,000-20,000 eggs, which male suckers then externally fertilize. They migrate to the larger streams where they spend their adulthood.

=== Growth ===
Jenny Creek Suckers live up to 5-6 years, while the Klamath population has a longer life expectancy up to 17 years. Both populations experience rapid growth in the first half of their lives, with Jenny Creek Suckers and Klamath smallscale suckers reaching their maximum sizes by around 3 years and 10 years, respectively. Compared to Jenny Creek Suckers that reach around 140 mm length at their maturity, Klamath suckers are significantly larger, reaching up to 400 mm in size.

== Genetics ==
Klamath smallscale suckers are genetically closely related to three other species of the Catostomidae family that also inhabit the Klamath River: Klamath largescale suckers, Lost River suckers, and shortnose suckers. The four species and their eggs are highly similar in appearance, leading to frequent misclassification. Research suggests that there is hybridization occurring among the four species, the cause of which has yet to be determined.

== Genetics ==
The Klamath smallscale sucker is one of four sucker species in the Klamath River Basin, along with the Klamath largescale sucker, Lost River sucker, and shortnose sucker. Unlike the other three, which are endemic and restricted to the Klamath Basin, the smallscale sucker also occurs outside it. A genetic study of more than 300 suckers from four Klamath subbasins and the neighboring Rogue River found that the Klamath smalscale and Lost River suckers were each genetically distinct from the other species. By contrast, shortnose and Klamath largescale suckers living together in the Lost River and upper Klamath Sprague River subbasins were genetically indistinguishable, which indicates that these two species have hybridized. The study’s authors recommended preserving the genetic diversity of all four species. Genetic analysis of the Smith River population in California suggests it was founded but six or fewer fish from the Klamath River.
