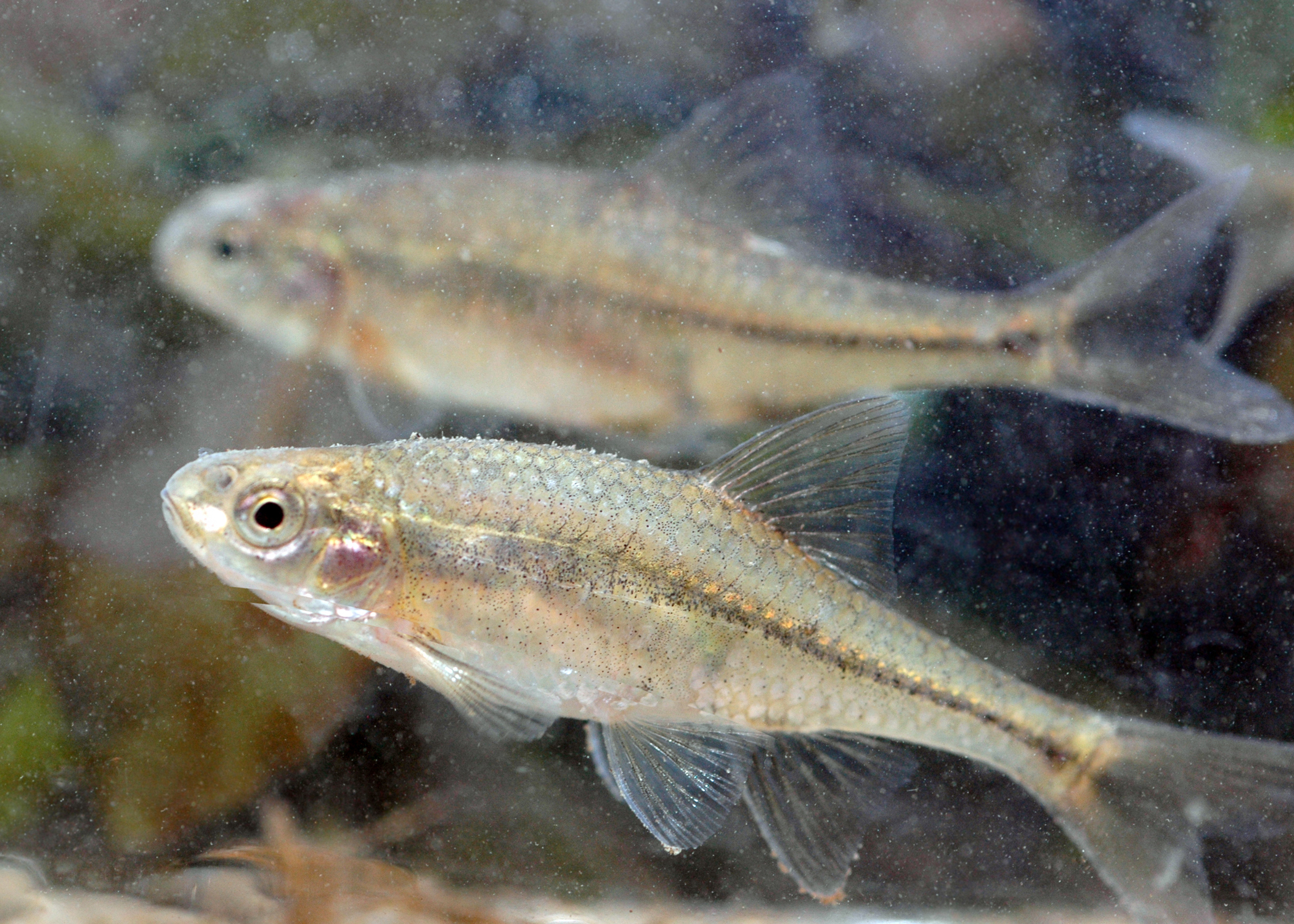
- Oregon chub (O. crameri)

Scientific classification
- Kingdom: Animalia
- Phylum: Chordata
- Class: Actinopterygii
- Order: Cypriniformes
- Family: Leuciscidae
- Subfamily: Pogonichthyinae
- Genus: Oregonichthys; C. L. Hubbs in Schultz, 1929

Type species
- Hybopsis crameri Snyder, 1908

= Oregonichthys =

Genus of fishes

Oregonichthys is a genus of freshwater ray-finned fish in the family Leuciscidae, the shiners, daces and minnows. Collectively known as Oregon chubs, that term can also refer to O. crameri in particular.

== Species ==
Oregonichthys contains the following species:

- Oregonichthys crameri (Snyder, 1908) (Oregon chub)
- Oregonichthys kalawatseti Markle, Pearsons & D. T. Bills, 1991 (Umpqua chub)
