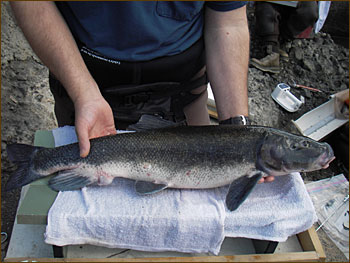
- Delistes luxatus

Scientific classification
- Kingdom: Animalia
- Phylum: Chordata
- Class: Actinopterygii
- Order: Cypriniformes
- Family: Catostomidae
- Subfamily: Catostominae
- Genus: Deltistes; Seale, 1896

Type species
- Chasmistes luxatus Cope, 1879

Species
- see text

= Deltistes =

Deltistes Temporal range: Pliocene–Recent

Genus of ray-finned fish in North America

Deltistes is a genus of North American freshwater ray-finned fish belonging to the family Catostomidae, the suckers.

== Species ==
Deltistes contains one extant and two extinct species:

- †Deltistes ellipticus R. R, Miller & G. R. Smith, 1967
- Deltistes luxatus Cope, 1879 (Lost River sucker)
- †Deltistes owyhee R. R, Miller & G. R. Smith, 1967
