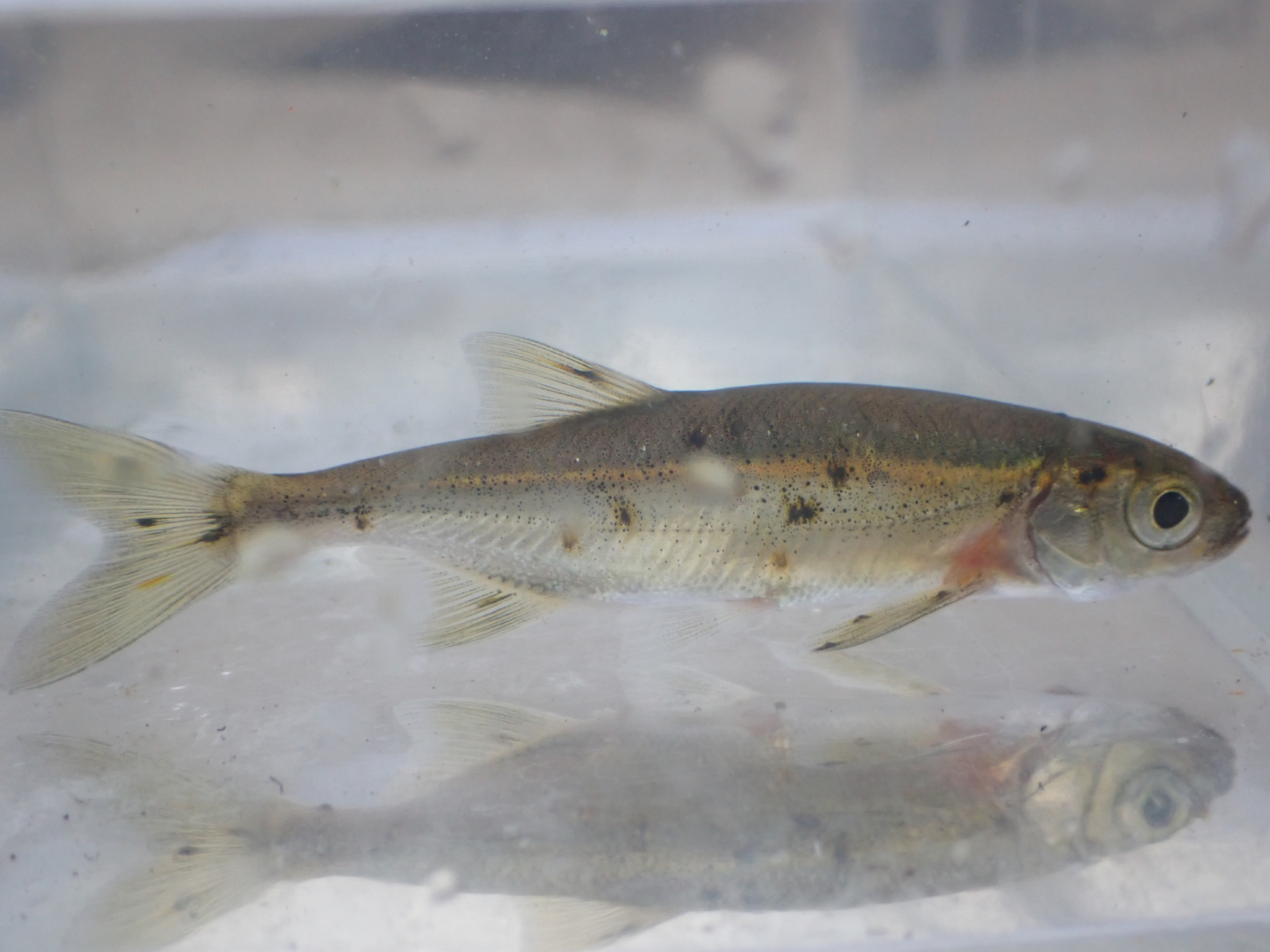
- Redside shiner(Richardsonius balteatus)

Scientific classification
- Kingdom: Animalia
- Phylum: Chordata
- Class: Actinopterygii
- Order: Cypriniformes
- Family: Leuciscidae
- Subfamily: Pogonichthyinae
- Genus: Richardsonius; Girard, 1856

Type species
- Cyprinus (Abramis) balteatus Richardson, 1836

= Richardsonius =

Richardsonius Temporal range: Pliocene–present

Genus of fishes

Richardsonius is a genus of freshwater ray-finned fishes belonging to the family Leuciscidae, the shiners, daces and minnows. The fishes in this genus are found in western North America. Commonly known as redside shiners, that term is also used to refer to Richardsonius balteatus specifically. The genus is named after naturalist Sir John Richardson (1787–1865), who described R. balteatus in 1836.

== Species ==
Richardsonius contains the following valid species:

- Richardsonius balteatus (J. Richardson, 1836) (Redside shiner)
- Richardsonius egregius (Girard, 1858) (Lahontan redside)

In addition, a single fossil species †Richardsonius durranti Smith, 1975 is known from the Pliocene-aged Glenns Ferry Formation of Idaho.
