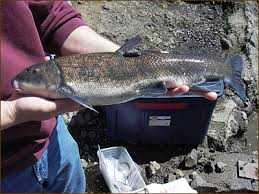

Conservation status
- Near Threatened (IUCN 3.1)

- Vulnerable (NatureServe)

Scientific classification
- Kingdom: Animalia
- Phylum: Chordata
- Class: Actinopterygii
- Order: Cypriniformes
- Family: Catostomidae
- Genus: Catostomus
- Species: C. snyderi

Binomial name
- Catostomus snyderi Gilbert, 1898

= Klamath largescale sucker =

Species of fish

The Klamath largescale sucker (Catostomus snyderi) is a species of ray-finned fish in the family Catostomidae. It is endemic to the Klamath River basin in northern California and southern Oregon, within the Western United States.

== Physical description ==
Notable physical features of the Klamath largescale sucker include its prominent subterminal mouth, a distinctive sucker, and a short, stubby body. The Klamath largescale sucker is fairly large for a sucker, and can grow up to 50cm. It has a short head, a thick caudal peduncle, and a robust body. It has a short dorsal fin that is positioned closer to the snout than the tail. The mouth is subterminal, with a narrow upper lip that has 4–5 rows of papillae, while the lower lip has a deep medial notch and a single row of papillae. The species' back is green, and its underside ranges from yellow to gold. It typically has 11–12 dorsal fin rays and 7 anal fin rays. The lateral line contains 67–81 scales, with 11–14 rows of scales above and 8–12 rows below.

== Diet ==
The species is a benthic omnivore. It is found among a variety of freshwater systems, such as lakes, rivers, and sloughs, respectively. Juveniles' diet consists of zooplankton; adults consume snails, worms, macro-invertebrates, and plant/algae material among the substrate.

== Biology ==
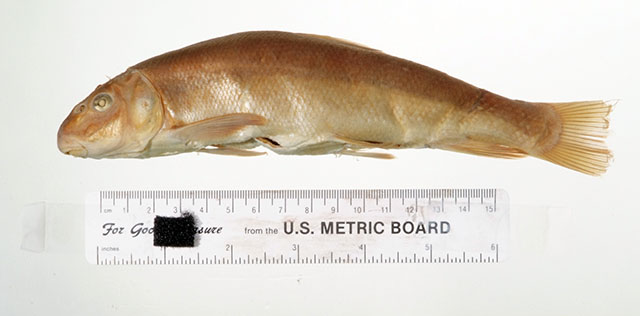
Measurement of Klamath Largescale Sucker

Growth rates for the Klamath Largescale Sucker have not been measured precisely, but they likely reach maturity at 20-30 cm in length, around 4-6 years of age. One male was found to be 7 years old and 31 centimeters long. The oldest recorded Klamath Largescale Sucker was 31 years old and measured 46 centimetres (18 in).

=== Reproductive behavior ===
In Upper Klamath Lake, spawning occurs from March to May, with a peak in late March when males migrate upriver first, followed by females. Spawning is triggered by rising temperatures (5.5-19°C) and water flow, starting when temperatures reach about 10°C. The number of eggs produced by females can vary, with estimates of around 39,000 to 64,000 eggs. After hatching, larvae move quickly from spawning sites to rearing areas, drifting at night during their early swim-up stage. Reproduction is undergone via broadcast spawning (gametes are released into the water to be externally fertilized). Furthermore, these eggs are noted as possessing adhesive properties, allowing them to bind to substrate.

== Range and habitat ==
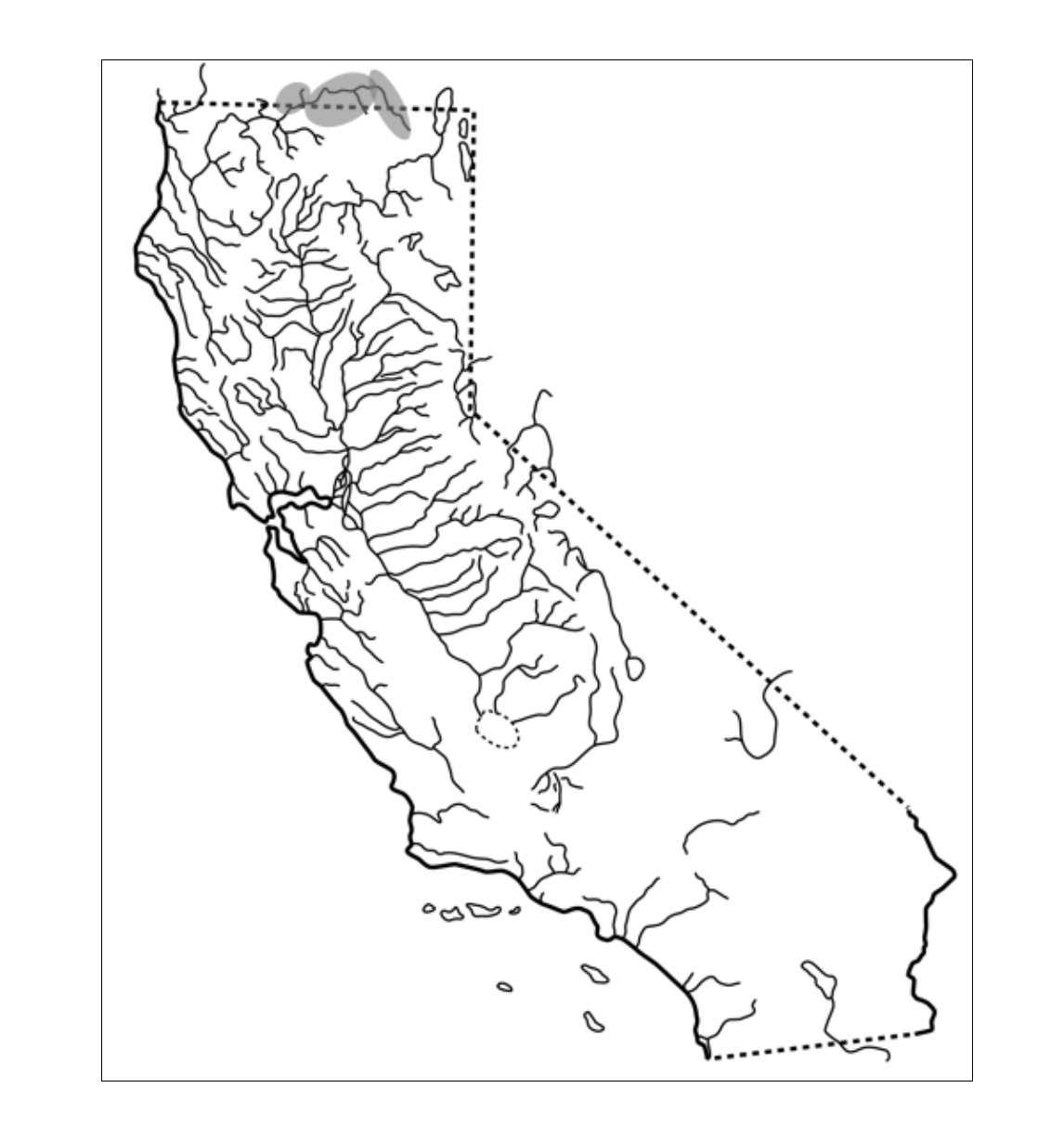
This is the distribution of Klamath Largescale Sucker, Catostomus snyderi, in the Klamath and Lost rivers systems in California. Distribution is shown within shaded areas.

This species is endemic to the Klamath River basin in northern California and southern Oregon, within the Western United States. In addition, although outside of its main range, species have also been observed as far north as British Columbia and far east as Montana. Habitat includes rocky pools and runs of creeks and small rivers, lakes, and reservoirs. Adult Klamath Largescale suckers likely lived in deep lake habitats, while juveniles stayed in streams or along lake margins. Today, several larger streams still support breeding populations. Adults have been found both near-shore and offshore in Upper Klamath Lake. They are most often found in large streams where water quality is fairly high, but can also be found in lakes. However, they cannot survive long in water temperatures that exceed 32°C and where dissolved oxygen levels are around 1 mg/L. Historically, they were likely more abundant in deep water lakes.

== Conservation status ==
The population of the Klamath Largescale Sucker has been judged by the IUCN as in decline. Not included under the Endangered Species Act, the species lacks significant legal protections and is consequently susceptible to human exploitation. Largescale Suckers in Northern California and Oregon face various threats throughout their life stages. These include migration barriers, altered water flows, pollution, habitat degradation (such as stream modifications and habitat loss), harvesting, and competition or predation from invasive species. Most water bodies where suckers are found fail to meet state water quality standards for nutrients, dissolved oxygen, temperature, and pH in both Oregon and California. The greatest contemporary threat now facing the species remains the draining of wetlands along the Klamath river basin. Lacking sufficient vegetation to uptake phosphorus and other organic compounds — themselves often the product of urban runoff — such compounds are free to enter the water en masse. This ultimately results in harmful algal blooms (HABs) and dead zones, which poses significant ecological harm. As these large algae blooms die off, their decomposition depletes oxygen in the water, leading to the death of fish and other aquatic life. The degraded water quality also increases the prevalence of pathogens and parasites, further weakening fish and compounding the challenges to sucker survival.

Klamath largescale suckers will also hybridize with the federally listed Lost River suckers and Shortnose suckers. In Oregon, most populations seem more stable, likely because they inhabit streams rather than the polluted waters of Upper and Lower Klamath Lakes. They are also able to cross barriers when fish ladders are available. In contrast, California populations are confined to a reservoir, a heavily polluted river, and a wastewater sump, making them more vulnerable to these threats.

After the dam removal of the Chiloquin/Sprague River Dam on the lower Williamson River in 2008, higher densities of drifting sucker larvae were observed downstream of the former dam location, but no significant changes were detected upstream. Adult spawning migrations were primarily influenced by water temperature and remained unaffected by the dam's removal. Larvae began consistently emigrating about 3–4 weeks after adults migrated into a specific section of the river. All three sucker species showed increased upstream migrations past the former dam site after its removal. The Klamath Largescale Suckers exhibited the most substantial increase in upstream migration after dam removal.

Going forward, climate change is expected to significantly impact aquatic habitats in California, primarily through rising water temperatures and shifts in the timing and frequency of droughts and floods. Higher water temperatures can negatively affect fish by reducing growth, lowering reproductive success, and increasing susceptibility to diseases. For suckers in the Lost River, already under stress from high summer temperatures, even minor temperature increases could have serious consequences.

Additionally, climate change will alter the timing and intensity of peak and base flows in streams due to decreased snowpack and reduced seasonal water retention. These changes could make streams less suitable for spawning and rearing and lead to lower flow levels in the Lost River, particularly during extended droughts. Klamath Largescale Suckers were identified as critically at risk of extinction due to the combined effects of climate change and existing stressorseven though there is limited data on their actual population numbers.

== Relationship with humans ==
Suckerfish, including the Klamath Largescale Sucker, hold significant cultural value for local tribes and were a primary food source for centuries before European settlement. They were an important food source to the indigenous peoples of the region prior to European/American colonization, particularly the Klamath and Modoc tribes.

Historically, the Klamath and Modoc Tribes harvested thousands of suckers annually while maintaining sustainable populations. Once celebrated for their delicate, flaky meat, Klamath suckers were highly valued well into the 20th century. Many preferred the sweet meat of this fish to any other fish. However, attitudes against "rough fish" began to fester as more desired non-native fish were introduced; Klamath suckerfish were no longer deemed valuable by the public or wildlife management. By 1962, perceptions of these suckers had grown so hostile that wildlife managers poisoned hundreds of miles of the Green River in an attempt to kill off razorback suckers and other native species to clear the way for imported Rainbow Trout.

Today, Klamath Tribes are limited to capturing only a small number of fish, primarily for scientific research and occasional ceremonial use. To support the survival of these species, the tribes, along with government agencies and private organizations, are actively working to protect and restore the habitats critical to sucker populations.

In the language of the Klamath tribes, Lost River and Shortnose Suckers are called c'waam and qapdo, respectively.

== Sources ==
- Markle, Douglas F.; Cavalluzzi, Martin R.; Simon, David C. (2005). "Morphology and Taxonomy of Klamath Basin Suckers (catostomidae)". Western North American Naturalist. 65 (4): 473–489. ISSN 1527-0904. JSTOR 41717483.
- Terwilliger, Mark R.; Reece, Tamal; Markle, Douglas F. (2010-11-01). "Historic and recent age structure and growth of endangered Lost River and shortnose suckers in Upper Klamath Lake, Oregon". Environmental Biology of Fishes. 89 (3): 239–252. Bibcode:2010EnvBF..89..239T. doi:10.1007/s10641-010-9679-9. ISSN 1573-5133.
