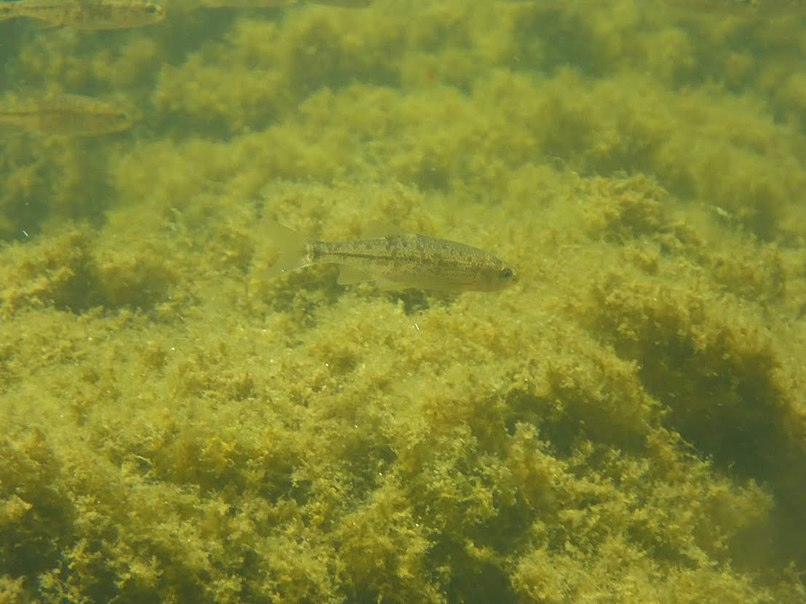
- Three Umpqua chub in the South Umpqua River (Photo taken during snorkel survey).

Conservation status
- Vulnerable (IUCN 3.1)

- Imperiled (NatureServe)

Scientific classification
- Kingdom: Animalia
- Phylum: Chordata
- Class: Actinopterygii
- Order: Cypriniformes
- Family: Leuciscidae
- Subfamily: Pogonichthyinae
- Genus: Oregonichthys
- Species: O. kalawatseti

Binomial name
- Oregonichthys kalawatseti Markle, Pearsons & D. T. Bills, 1991

= Umpqua chub =

Species of fish

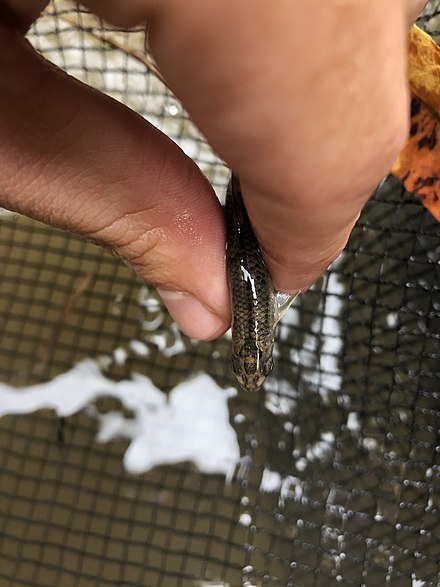
Inverted dark colored heart shape on top of Umpqua Chub head.

The Umpqua chub or Umpqua Oregon chub (Oregonichthys kalawatseti) is a species of freshwater ray-finned fish beloinging to the family Leuciscidae, the shiners, daces and minnows. It is found only in the Umpqua River and partially in its tributaries (North Umpqua, South Umpqua, Smith River, Calapooya, Cow Creek, and Ollala Creek), Oregon in the United States, making it an endemic species to that watershed. While geographic populations are split into six regions, genetic studies suggest that there are four genetically distinct populations: Smith River, Elk Creek, Calapooya Creek-Olalla Creek, and Cow Creek-South Umpqua River.

== Ecology ==
Umpqua chub generally inhabit slower moving waters. When found in faster waters, they typically reside close to banks in small pools and side-channels under riparian vegetation. Dietary habits for Umpqua chub are relatively unknown. In a sample of 20 individuals from the Calapooya River, a gut analysis showed traces of infaunal Chironomids, epifaunal Dytiscids, Ephemeroptera, and sand. Umpqua Chub populations are, overall, in decline. Introduced Smallmouth bass are presumed to be the cause of this decline for a variety of reasons (direct predation, competition, etc.).

== Identification ==
Umpqua Chub are typically less than 65 mm (2.6 in) (Fork Length). They have a dark brown lateral line. Above the lateral line is a peppering of brown scales that extends from the caudal peduncle to the nose of the fish. Umpqua chub have a distinctive upside-down heart shaped mark on top of their head behind their eyes. Umpqua chub have a terminal mouth and a lightly forked caudal fin.
