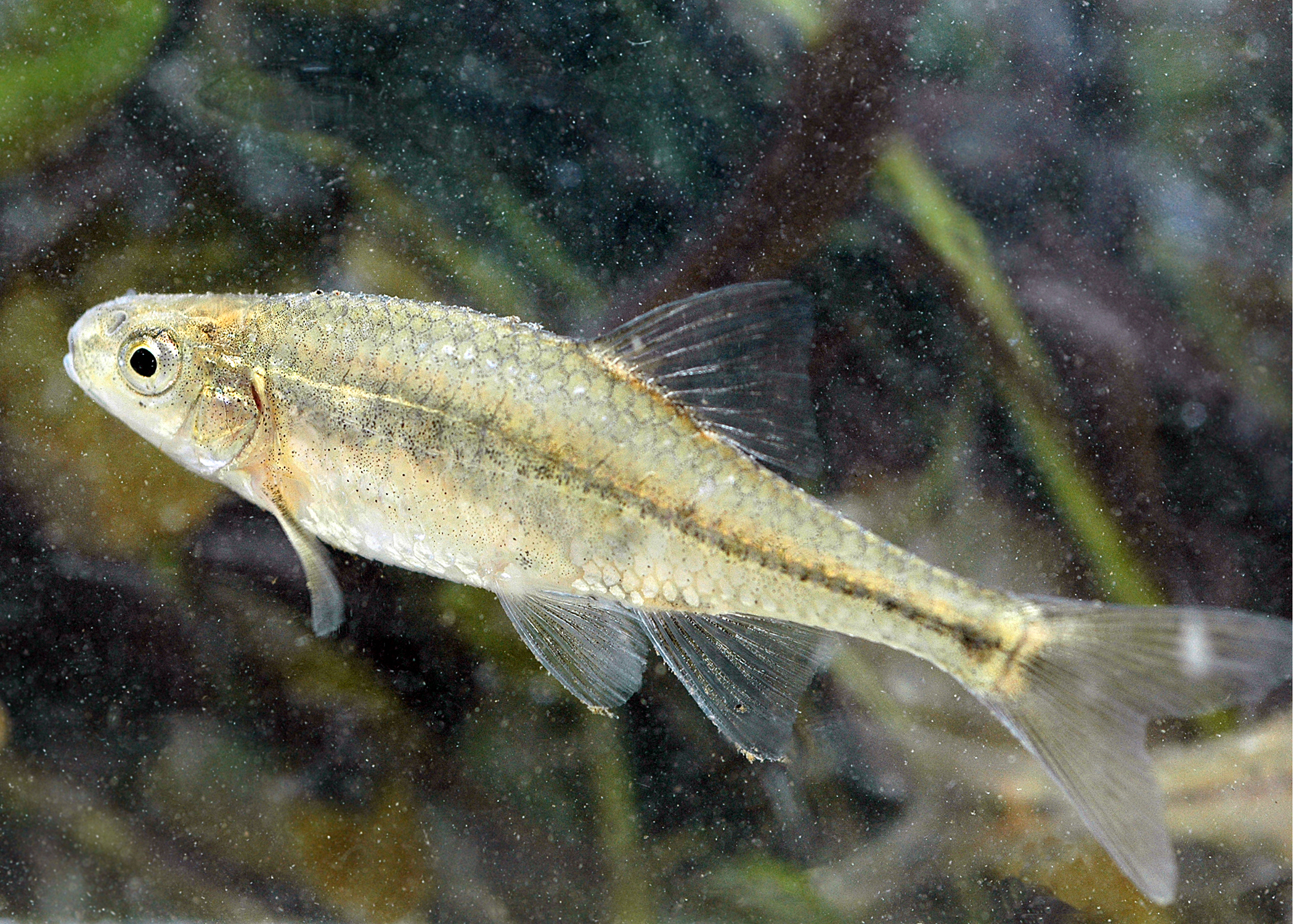

Conservation status
- Least Concern (IUCN 3.1)

- Vulnerable (NatureServe)

Scientific classification
- Kingdom: Animalia
- Phylum: Chordata
- Class: Actinopterygii
- Division: Teleostei
- Order: Cypriniformes
- Family: Leuciscidae
- Genus: Oregonichthys
- Species: O. crameri

Binomial name
- Oregonichthys crameri (Snyder, 1908)

Synonyms
- Hybopsis crameri Snyder 1908

= Oregon chub =

Species of fish

The Oregon chub (Oregonichthys crameri) is a species of freshwater ray-finned fish belonging to the family Leuciscidae, the shiners, daces and minnows. It is endemic to Oregon in the United States. From 1993 to 2015 it was a federally listed threatened species.Their scales are relatively large, with less than 40 on their lateral line. The scales towards the caudal fin are outlined with a darker pigment.

This chub is native to the drainage of the Willamette River in Oregon. It was once distributed throughout the drainage in shallow water habitat, but changes in the hydrology of the region have eliminated much of this habitat and restricted the chub to several streams and rivers. Dams and channels were constructed and non-native species of fish were introduced to the area. The chub was listed as endangered in 1993 and downlisted to threatened in 2010.

In early 2014, the U.S. Fish and Wildlife Service said that the small, silver-speckled minnow would become the first fish to be taken off the endangered species list when its numbers returned from fewer than 1,000 individuals to an estimated 160,000. It was delisted on February 17, 2015 with populations of more than 140,000 in 80 different locations.
