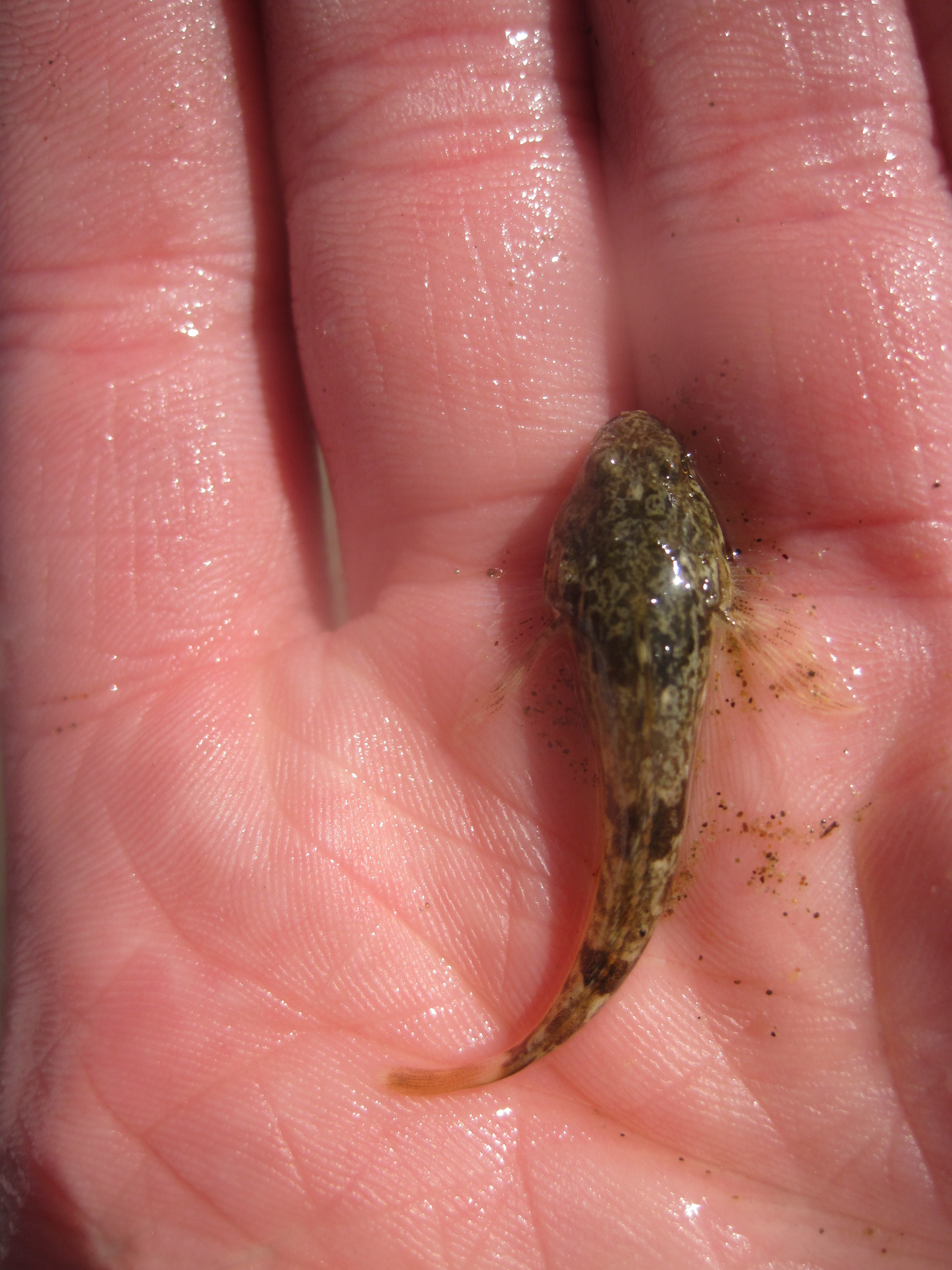
- Juvenile Coastrange sculpin from Morro Bay, California

Conservation status
- Least Concern (IUCN 3.1)

Scientific classification
- Kingdom: Animalia
- Phylum: Chordata
- Class: Actinopterygii
- Order: Perciformes
- Suborder: Cottoidei
- Family: Cottidae
- Genus: Cottus
- Species: C. aleuticus

Binomial name
- Cottus aleuticus (Gilbert, 1896)

Synonyms
- Cottus protrusus (Schultz & Spoor, 1933); Uranidea microstoma (Lockington, 1880)

= Coastrange sculpin =

Species of fish

The Coastrange sculpin (Cottus aleuticus) is a freshwater sculpin of the genus Cottus. They are commonly found near the ocean in western North America, namely Canada and the United States. It is also known as the Aleutian sculpin.

== Taxonomy ==
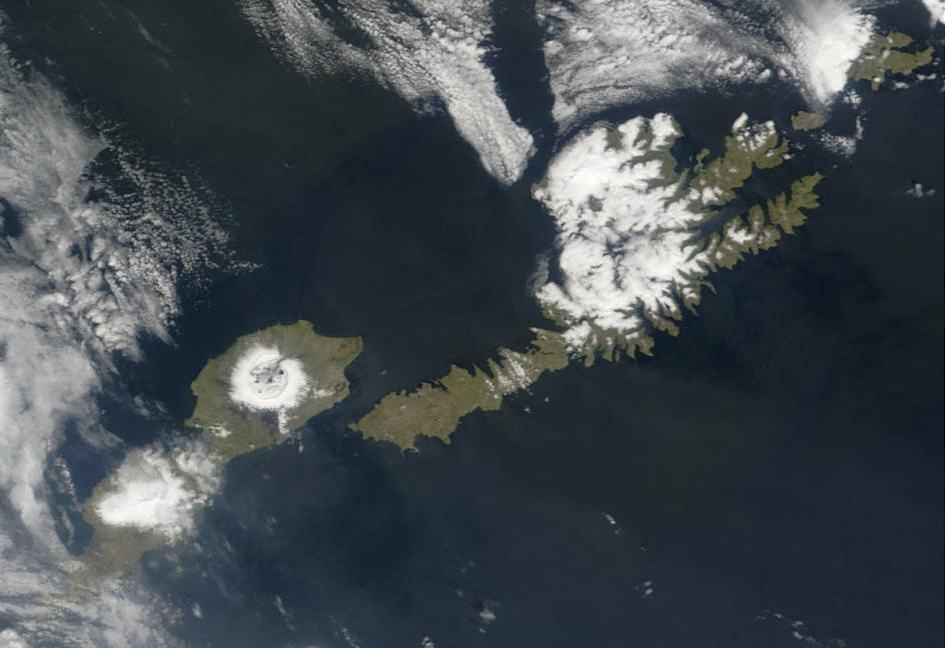
A Satellite view of the type locality: Unalaska (right).

While the name Uranidea microstoma has been used since 1880, it is unclear whether or not it corresponds to the Coastrange sculpin. The species was first officially described by Charles Henry Gilbert in 1896 from specimens he collected in streams of Unalaska island the year before. Cottus protrusus was described in 1933, but it has since been found to be a synonym.

== Description ==
The Coastrange sculpin can be distinguished from other species due to several unique traits. It only has one pore under its chin, no palatine teeth, and no distinct gap between the two dorsal fins. Adults can grow to be as long as 17 cm, although their average length is only 6 cm. Their maximum reported life span is 8 years. Breeding female Coastrange sculpins are generally larger than males. Breeding males are almost entirely black with a tiny bit of orange trim on the first dorsal fin.

=== Cultus Lake population ===
At Cultus Lake in British Columbia, one of the three areas where isolated populations of Coastrange sculpin exist, there exists a form smaller than the norm that lives in the lake depths and migrates to the surface at night to feed. The Adults of this subtype, while smaller are fully mature save for the enlarged head pores that juveniles of the main form exhibit. There is no clear explanation for what produced this phenotype, which differs from all other populations.

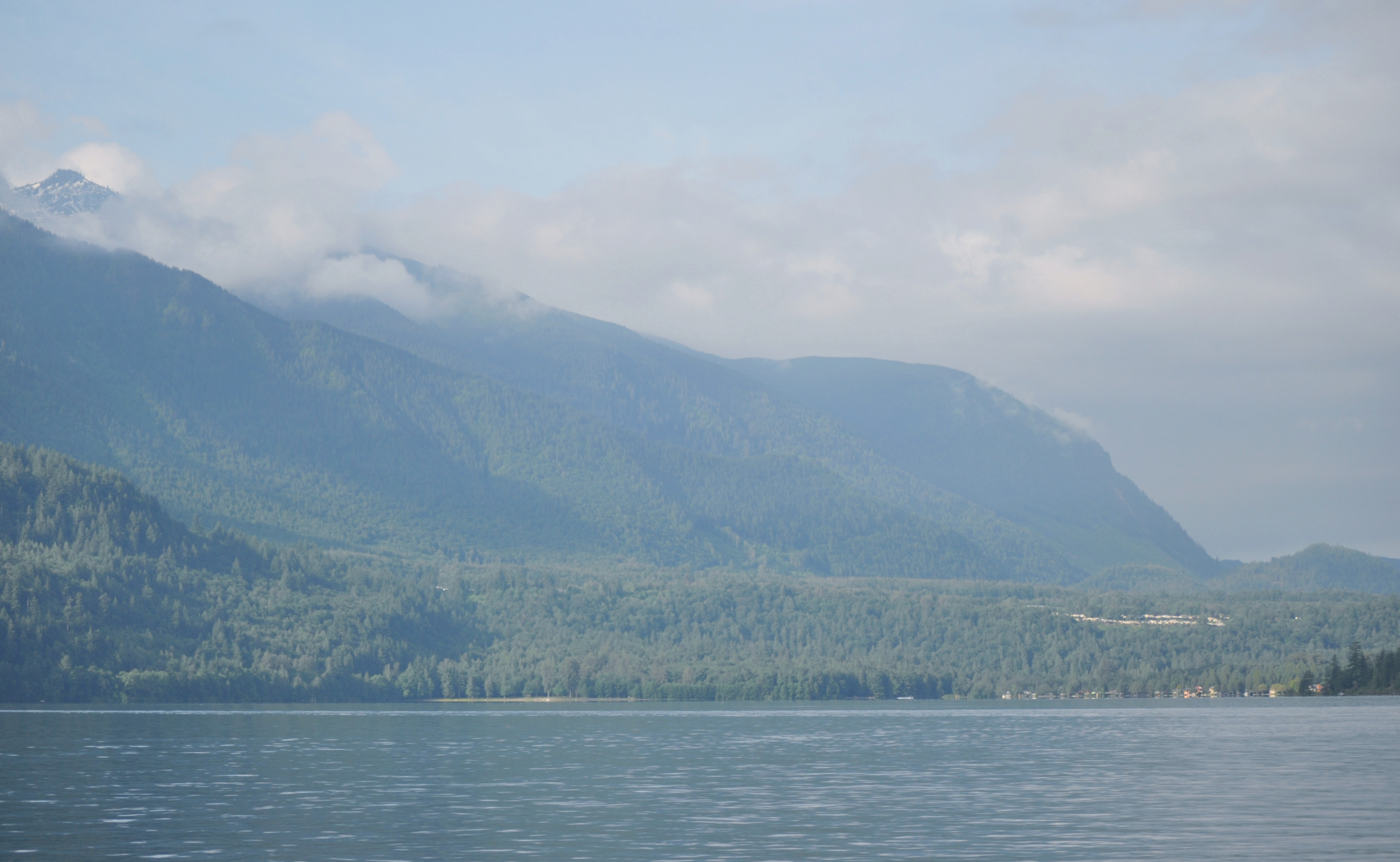
Cultus lake

== Distribution and habitat ==
The Coastrange sculpin is found exclusively along the Pacific coast of North America. They range from Bristol bay and the Aleutian Islands of Alaska, south to Santa Barbara County, California, Though they can also be found sporadically in streams as far south as Mendocino County There are also isolated populations in Alaska's Kobuk river, Lake Washington of Washington state, and British Columbia's Cultus Lake.

Living mostly in rivers and streams, Coastrange sculpins are found in riffles and glides with coarse or cobble stone bottoms from .20m to 1.0m in depth. At night, they move into shallower, calmer waters on the edges of rivers. It occurs in virtually the same habitats as the Prickly sculpin (Cottus asper) and the two species encounter one another and interact regularly. They also tend to encounter salmon and the Three-spined stickleback as well.

== Behavior ==
Coastrange sculpins are solitary, nocturnal carnivores and known to eat nymphs and larvae of insects such as mayflies, stoneflies, and chironomids (and other aquatic invertebrates). They are also known to eat the eggs and fry of the pink and chum salmon. Their larvae are free swimming/floating and feed mostly on plankton, however they become bottom dwellers after they transform and eat the same diet as the adults, except that they take smaller organisms as prey. They are also eaten by coastal cutthroat trout, coho and sockeye salmon, and Dolly Varden trout.

=== Spawning ===
Coastrange sculpins normally spawn in spring, when the water warms past 6 degrees C, though eggs have been found as early as January in British Columbia. During spawning both males and females migrate downstream, stopping just short of estuaries. Males both excavate and defend the nesting site, which is normally under flat rocks. During courtship, a female approaches the nesting site and the male begins a series of head nods, shakes and flares of the gill covers. Sometimes the body undulates during the head movements, sometimes the undulations exist without head motion altogether. Several of these movements are not for visual effect but for producing a distinct sound to attract the female. If the male has gained interest, the female will move closer into the nest site and the male will bite her on the cheek, side, tail, or pectoral fin; the male may even take the female's head into his mouth. If the female is able to lay eggs, she will always enter the nest after being bitten. Inside the nest, the female turns upside down and releases eggs that the male fertilizes. Males will spawn with multiple females this way, and may also spawn with each female multiple times.

Coastrange sculpin eggs are yellow to orange in color and are deposited on the underside of the flat rock at the top of the nest. They are less prolific than other sculpins and only produce an average of ~1000 eggs. Larvae are active immediately after hatching and begin a nocturnal migration further downstream, where they usually grow for about a year in estuaries before returning to freshwater.
