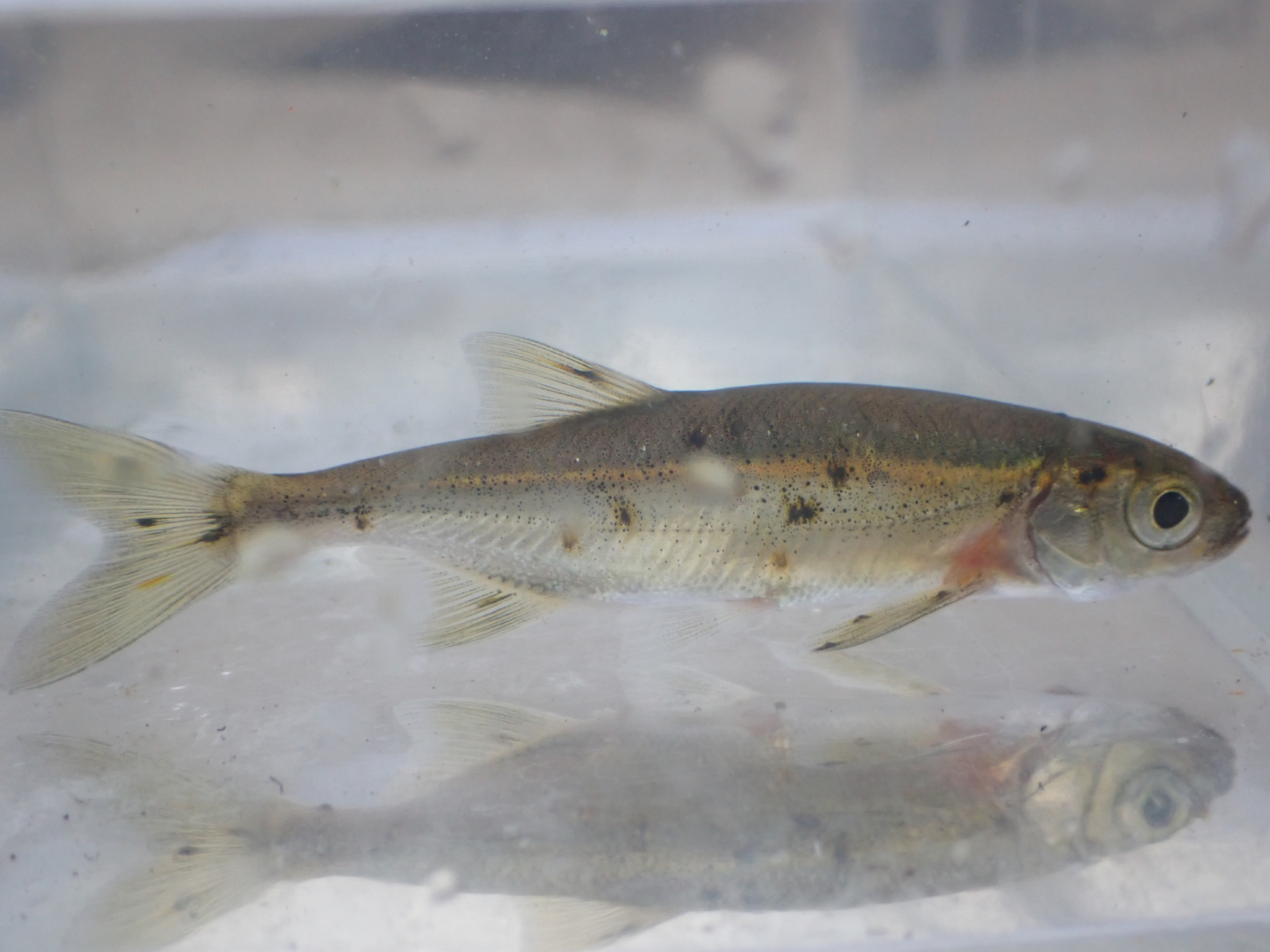

Conservation status
- Least Concern (IUCN 3.1)

Scientific classification
- Kingdom: Animalia
- Phylum: Chordata
- Class: Actinopterygii
- Order: Cypriniformes
- Family: Leuciscidae
- Subfamily: Pogonichthyinae
- Genus: Richardsonius
- Species: R. balteatus

Binomial name
- Richardsonius balteatus (J. Richardson, 1836)

Synonyms
- Cyprinus balteatus Richardson, 1836; Tigoma humboldti Girard, 1856; Richardsonius lateralis Girard, 1856; Clinostomus hydrophlox Cope, 1872; Clinostomis montanus Cope, 1872; Clinostomus taenia Cope, 1876; Leuciscus gilli Evermann, 1892; Leuciscus siuslawi Evermann & Meek, 1898; Rochardsonius thermalis Evermann & Cockerell, 1909

= Redside shiner =

Species of fish

The redside shiner (Richardsonius balteatus) is a species of freshwater ray-finned fish belonging to the family Leuciscidae, the shiners, daces and minnows. This fish is found in the Western United States and British Columbia. This species was first described by Sir John Richardson, a Scottish naturalist and naval surgeon. The type locality is from the Columbia River, and it is believed to have been sampled near Fort Vancouver. This species has a large native range, spanning from southern Utah to northern British Columbia. There are currently two subspecies (R. b. balteatus and R. b. hydrophlox), but phylogeographic analysis based on mitochondrial DNA sequence data suggests that there are three main clades, therefore the two subspecies taxonomy may not accurately reflect the evolution of the group. However, a formal taxonomic update has not been made.

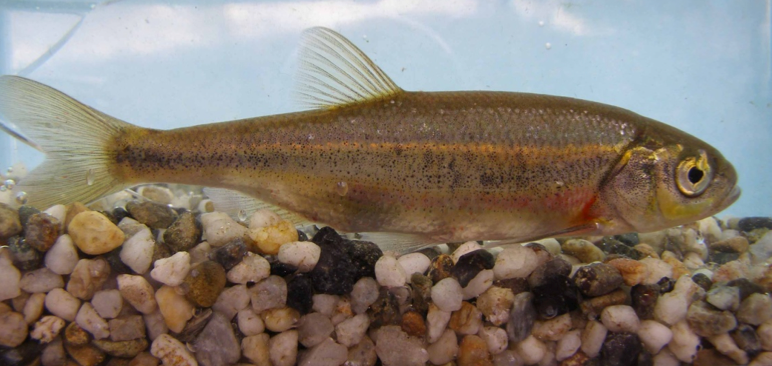

== Habitat and distribution ==
The redside shiner typically inhabits cold waters including ponds, lakes, pools, and backwaters of large rivers as well as small streams and shallow edges of lakes and ponds. Their natural range is mostly west of the Rocky Mountains of North America with the exception of the Peace River in northern British Columbia and Alberta, extending southward through most of Washington, Oregon and Idaho, western Montana, northern Nevada, and the Bonneville Basin in Utah. The species has been introduced into northwestern Colorado, southwestern Wyoming, the upper Missouri River drainage in Montana and in reservoirs outside its native distribution in southern Utah. Some of these introductions are from illegal bait bucket transfers, likely done by well-meaning anglers to increase forage for sport fish, but not an ecologically sound decision in most cases. Being aggressive colonizers, they rapidly expand in waters that fit their ecological niche requirements.

Subspecies R. b. balteaus is distributed across Washington, Oregon, northern Idaho, western Montana and British Columbia as well as the Peace system in northern Alberta. Subspecies R. b. hydrophlox is distributed in Utah's Bonneville Basin and waters in the Snake River Plain above Shoshone Falls as well as a disjunct population in the Malheur region of southeast Oregon.

It is broadly accepted that geological processes (river capture and lake spillover events such as the Bonneville flood) and changing climate (survival in and expansion from Pleistocene refugia) have contributed to this species current geographic distribution as described by Hubbs and Miller (1948), Minckley et al (1981), McPhail and Lindsey (1981).

== Morphology ==
The redside shiner has a silver coloration on its sides and a dark (olive or brown) coloration on its back. It has a thick black stripe and a smaller red/gold stripe along the lateral line. Additional red coloration is exhibited on the lower half of the anterior end of the body during spring spawning, especially in males.

The fish has a deep, laterally compressed body shape, a forked homocercal tail, and a complete, decurved lateral line. Its anal fin is composed of 10–24 rays, and its dorsal fin is composed of 8–12 rays. Neither of these fins have any spines. The fish has between 52 and 67 lateral line scales, and typical specimens are between 55 and 80 millimeters in length (2.2-3.1 inches). It has a conical snout, no barbels, and a terminal mouth with pharyngeal teeth arranged as 2,4-4,2 or 2,5-5,2. Its eyes are relatively large in comparison to its body size. Meristics vary among the subspecies R. b. balteaus and R. b. hydrophlox.

== Life cycle ==
The redside shiner is a short-lived fish, maturing around age 2, living on average 5–6 years but has been recorded living up to 8 years. They spawn in spring into the early summer, and their eggs are coated by a sticky adhesive that allows them to stick to rocks and vegetation. Their diet includes aquatic and terrestrial invertebrates, as well as the eggs and fry of other species. They are an intraguild predator meaning that they are both predators and prey to larger species such as salmon.

== Conservation status ==
The redside shiner is considered to be a species of Least Concern according to the International Union for Conservation of Nature (IUCN). However, in areas where the redside shiner has been introduced outside its native range, the species can become invasive.
