= Clear Lake National Wildlife Refuge =

National Wildlife Refuge of the United States in northeastern California

- IUCN category IV (habitat/species management area)
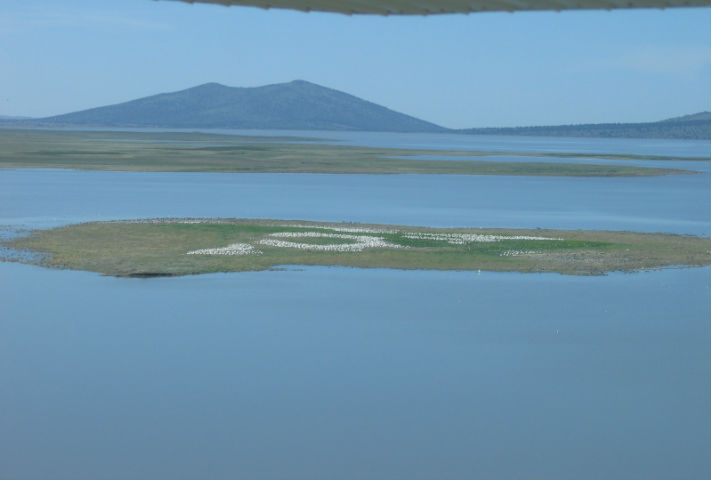

- Location within the United States
- Location: Modoc County, California, United States
- Nearest city: Tulelake, California
- Coordinates: 41.8621°N 121.14331°W
- Area: 46,460 acres (188.0 km^{2})
- Established: 1911
- Governing body: U.S. Fish and Wildlife Service
- Website: Clear Lake NWR

Clear Lake National Wildlife Refuge is a National Wildlife Refuge of the United States in northeastern California. It includes about 20,000 acres (81 km^{2}) of open water surrounded by over 26,000 acres (110 km^{2}) of upland bunchgrass, low sagebrush, and juniper habitat. Small, rocky islands in the wetlands provide breeding sites for American white pelicans, double-crested cormorants, and other colony-nesting birds.

The uplands are inhabited by pronghorn, mule deer, and sage grouse. The Clear Lake Reservoir is the primary source of water for the croplands of the eastern Klamath Basin, with water levels regulated by the Bureau of Reclamation.

Except for limited pronghorn and waterfowl hunting during the state hunting seasons, the refuge is closed to all public access for the protection of habitat and wildlife.
