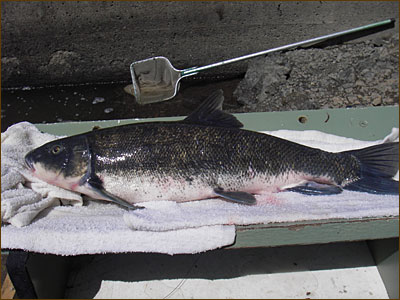

Conservation status
- Endangered (IUCN 3.1)

Scientific classification
- Kingdom: Animalia
- Phylum: Chordata
- Class: Actinopterygii
- Division: Teleostei
- Order: Cypriniformes
- Family: Catostomidae
- Genus: Chasmistes
- Species: C. brevirostris

Binomial name
- Chasmistes brevirostris Cope, 1879

= Shortnose sucker =

Species of fish

The shortnose sucker (Chasmistes brevirostris), also known as the koptu (pronounced /ˈkɒp.tuː/ KOP-too) by the Klamath Tribes, is a rare species of fish in the family Catostomidae, the suckers. It is native to southern Oregon and northern California in the United States. This species and related ones were a major food source for local tribes, and are still considered to be sacred animals. It is a federally listed endangered species of the United States.

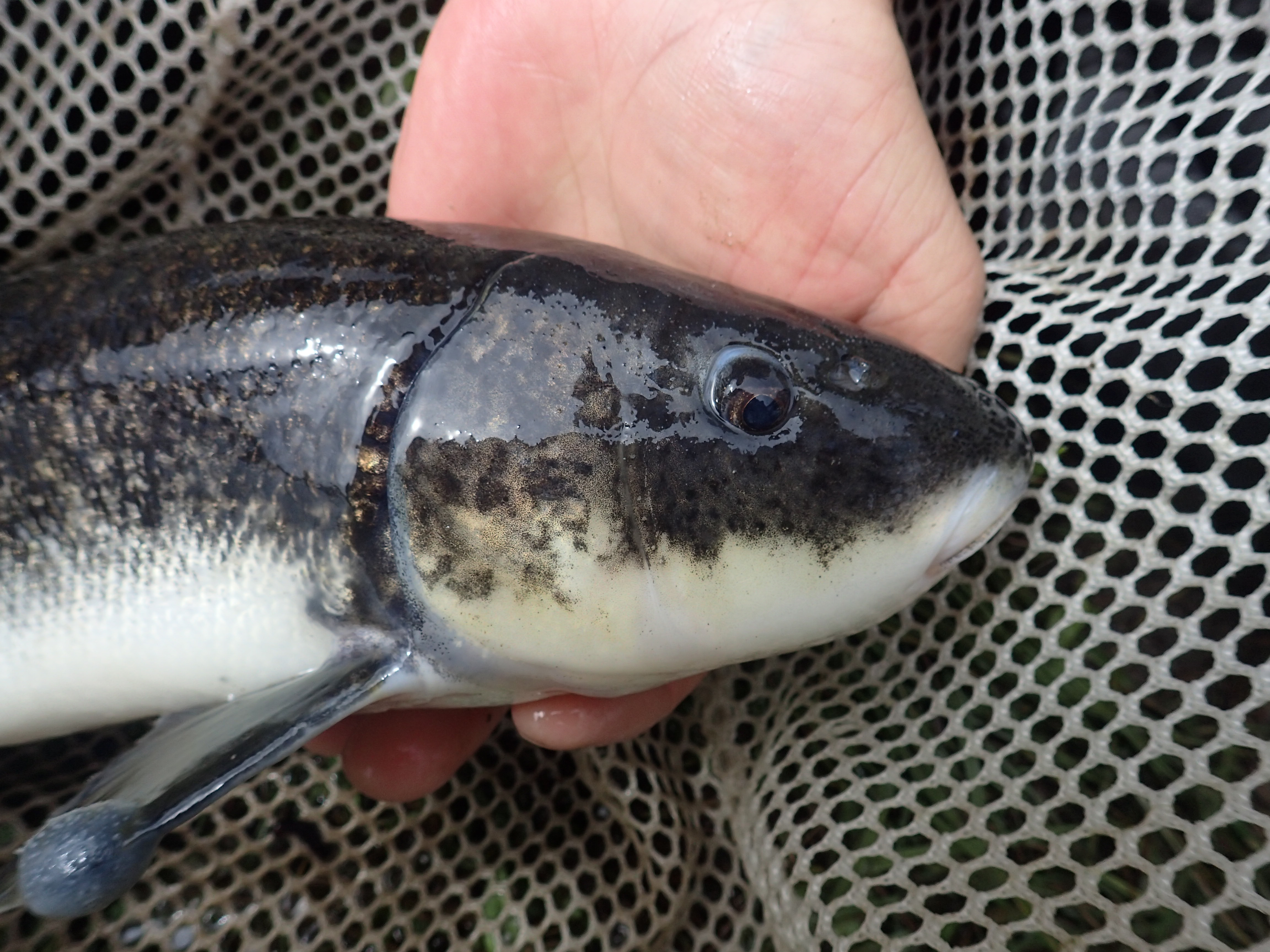
Close up side view of a shortnose sucker's head.

== Description ==
Shortnose suckers have quite a variable shapes and forms, making them difficult to distinguish from other fish (and have been miscategorized as unique species more than once). They nevertheless display all the characteristic features of this family as well as unique ones to brevirostris.

=== Morphology ===
Though their appearance can vary, they are generally characterized by a fusiform, cylindrically shaped body. C. brevirostris have relatively large, wide heads, with terminal mouths and thinner lips than typically found in this family. Their noses are blunted and may have a small hump at the tip. They tend to be darkly colored on their tops and sides but silvery to white on their bellies and lower lips. When spawning the fish gain a reddish tint to the scales surrounding the lateral line. They have thin triangularly shaped gill rakers with tufted or knobbed ends.

Juveniles tend to have separated lower lip lobes, a short but deep peduncle, with a relatively long anal fin (reaching past the beginning of the caudal fin when laid flat).

=== Identification ===
When trying to identify this fish amongst its close relatives, look for a notched lower lip, striped patterns on both lips, and few or no papillae on the lips (fewer than five pairs).

While meristics can assist with identification, the shortnose suckers' habit for variation makes ranges wide and accuracy difficult. On average, the number of anal fin rays present in this fish is seven, the number of lateral line scales ranges from 67 to 92, the number of pairs of gill rakers ranges from 32 to 41, and the number of dorsal fin rays ranges from 10 to 13.

Accurately identifying shortnose suckers, despite their variable morphology and tendency to hybridize with nearby sucker species, is very important for conservation work. Brand new techniques analyzing vertebral structures and genetic markers have been developed to more accurately identify these fish, amidst their challenges, when morphology and meristics cannot.

== Natural history ==
The sucker family has a long history in the fossil record, going back millions of years. Shortnose suckers share characteristics with other suckers in the Klamath River Basin, but most closely resemble Lost River suckers; which they are known to frequently hybridize with. The Lost River population of shortnose suckers have more subterminally located mouths and wider lips, possibly as a result of hybridization.

=== Ecology ===
Shortnose suckers are susceptible to avian predation and are often victims and intermediate hosts for trematodes aiming to parasitize the birds that attack unfortunate fish. There may be adverse effects to the development of larvae encountering parasites, though studies remain inconclusive.

The juveniles generally stay along the shoreline in vegetated or unvegetated habitat. They are vulnerable to predation from shorebirds, preferring to stay out of sight in the daytime to remain safe.

=== Taxonomy ===
The shortnose sucker was formally named and described in 1879 by E.D. Cope. "Chasmistes" translates to "one who yawns" and the specific "brevirostris," means "short snouted", Chasmistes brevirostris.

== Distribution ==
=== Geographic range ===
Today this fish can be found in Upper Klamath Lake and its tributaries, the Lost River, Clear Lake, the Klamath River, and Gerber Reservoir of the Klamath Project. Though, only the Upper Klamath Lake, Gerber Reservoir, and Clear Lake have been seen to be active spawning populations. They historically resided in deeper areas of the river as well as extended further within the basin in Tule and Sheepy Lakes.

=== Habitat ===
The preferable habitat for the fish is a large, turbid, shallow, somewhat alkaline, clear, well-oxygenated lake that is cool, but not cold, in the summer season.

As California's drought conditions have continued, driven by the rising climate, the habitat range of Shortnose Suckers has shrunk significantly. Many of the lakes they could once inhabit have become warm, shallow, and anoxic as a result of toxic algal blooms produced by agricultural runoff. While the fish have some tolerance for adverse conditions, they are not ideal. To overcome this challenge, C. brevirostris in the Upper Klamath tend to aggregate near river inflow points in the lake where water is clearer and conditions are more favorable.

== Biological information ==
=== Reproduction ===
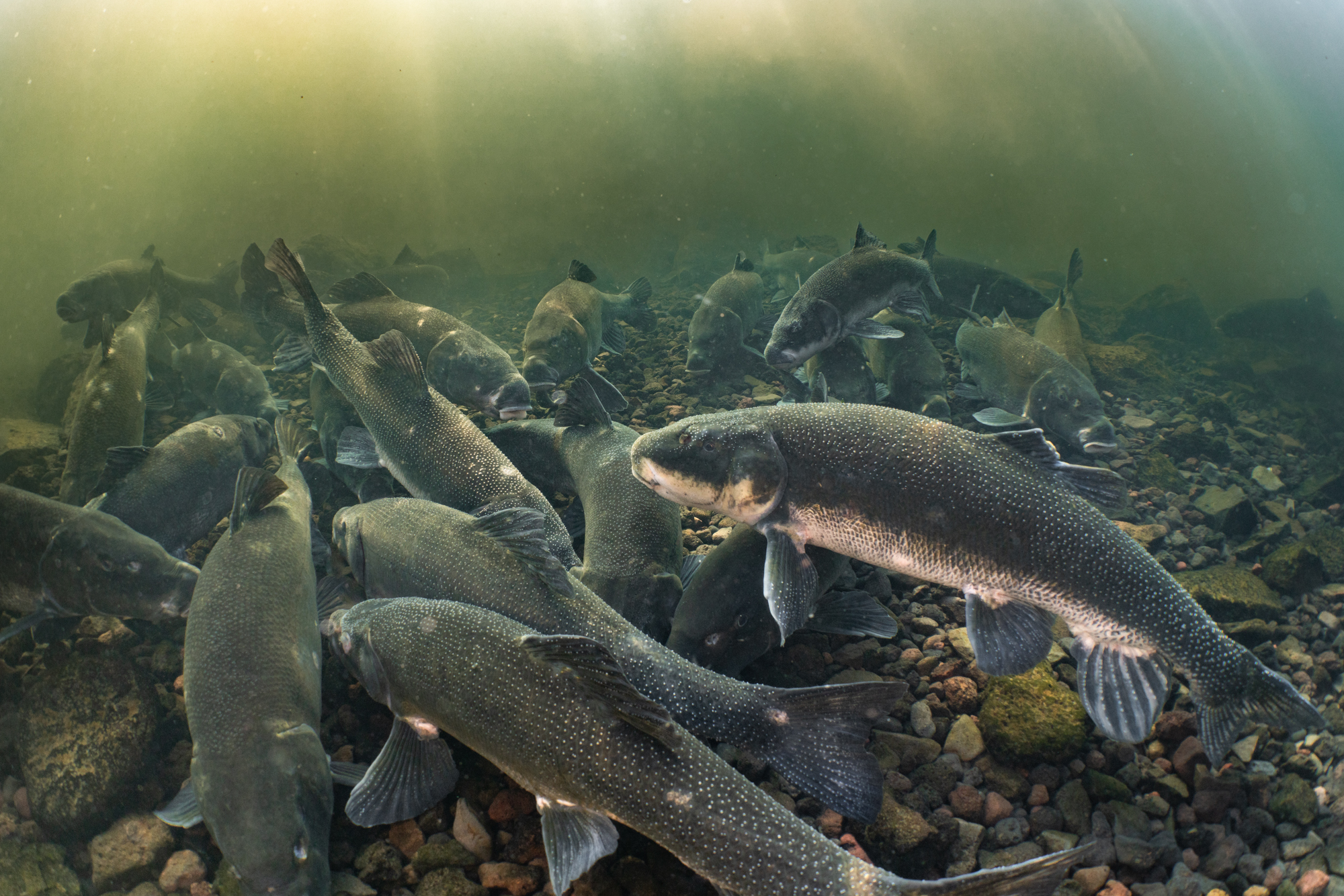
Several shortnose suckers congregated in the bottom waters of a river.

The fish usually spawns in flowing river habitat, such as riffles, with gravelly or rocky substrates. It was at one time observed to spawn at lakeshores, but it apparently does this rarely today. The eggs incubate for two weeks and the juveniles hatch between April and June. The exact time it takes for eggs to develop is temperature dependent.

=== Development ===
Juvenile shortnose suckers hide during the day, to avoid predation, and migrate toward their adult, lake habitat, downstream in the nighttime. When juveniles have reached their home lakes, they shift to a benthic lifestyle. They will congregate in vegetation near the bottom to forage and take advantage of the oxygen rich environment.

=== Diet ===
C. brevirostris largely eat cladoceran zooplankton, algae, and other small marine invertebrates and crustaceans. Juveniles feed more in benthic areas, eating mostly insect larvae.

== Importance ==
=== Conservation status ===
Threats to this species include the reduction of its spawning habitat, much of which was eliminated by the construction of dams in local waterways. Upper Klamath Lake experiences periodic blooms of cyanobacteria and reduction of dissolved oxygen in the water. Land alteration along the waterways has caused loss and degradation of the habitat.

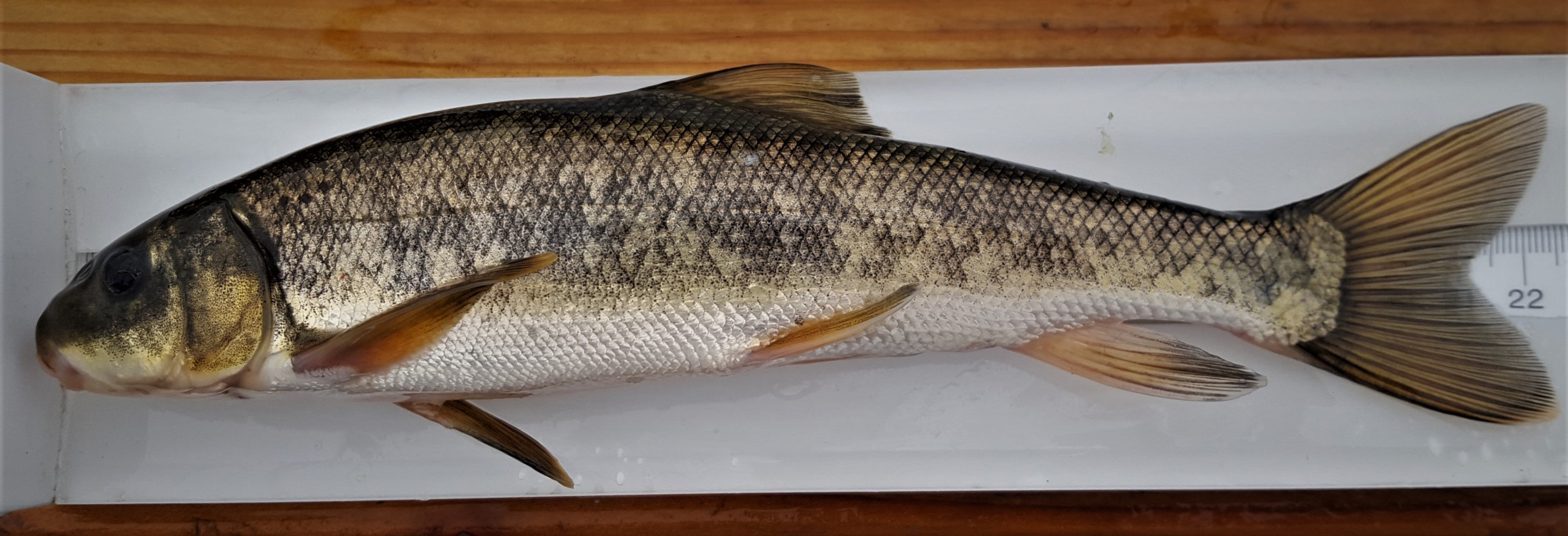
Shortnose sucker, also known as koptu (and quadpo), seen from the side.

Beginning in 2023, a conservation project went underway to remove four dams in large portions of the Klamath River. State agencies worked in conjunction with the Klamath tribes to create a plan for best conserving C’waam and Koptu. The dams had blocked the spawning path of these important suckers and many other fish for over a century. All four dams were fully removed by October 2024, allowing fish to finally swim freely.

=== Cultural significance ===
This species and related ones were a major food source for local tribes, and are still considered to be sacred animals. The Karuk, Klamath, and Modoc tribes have all used shortnose suckers and related fish as food sources of great cultural significance. The efforts to remove the dams on the Klamath River were led largely by members of these tribes, attempting to restore these fish to ecological stability while strengthening their own communities as well.
