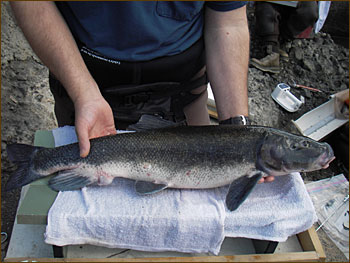

Conservation status
- Endangered (IUCN 3.1)

- Endangered (ESA)

Scientific classification
- Kingdom: Animalia
- Phylum: Chordata
- Class: Actinopterygii
- Order: Cypriniformes
- Family: Catostomidae
- Genus: Deltistes
- Species: D. luxatus

Binomial name
- Deltistes luxatus (Cope, 1879)

Synonyms
- Catostomus luxatus (Cope, 1879); Chasmistes luxatus Cope, 1879; Catostomus rex Eigenmann, 1891

= Lost River sucker =

Species of fish

The Lost River sucker (Deltistes luxatus), known as the c'waam (pronounced /tʃwɑːm/ CHWAHM) by the Klamath Tribes, is a species of ray-finned fish in the family Catostomidae. It is the only living member of the genus Deltistes. It is found only in California and Oregon. Its population is much reduced from historical numbers for a number of reasons. It is federally listed as an endangered species of the United States.

== Description ==
This fish is one of the largest suckers, capable of reaching 86 cm (34 in) in length. It can be identified by its long snout with a small hump on top. It is dark on the back and sides and whitish or yellowish on the belly. Its lifespan can exceed 40 years. It does not reach sexual maturity until six to fourteen years of age, most maturing around age nine.

== Distribution and habitat ==
The sucker prefers deep lakes and pools and fast currents. It goes to the shoreline to obtain food and shelter in the vegetation. It spawns in streams with riffles and substrates of gravel and cobble. Spawning occurs in March, April, and May. The female contains many eggs, up to 235,000, and spawns with several males. The fish spawns several times during its life. The eggs incubate on the stream bottoms for two or three weeks and the larval stage is 40 to 50 days long. The larvae find shelter in emergent vegetation near the shore. The sucker eats a variety of animal material, including zooplankton, various other invertebrates, and periphyton.

This fish is endemic to the Upper Klamath Basin straddling the border between southern Oregon and northern California. Its distribution included Upper Klamath Lake, its tributaries, and most of the creeks that drain into it, as well as the Lost River, Tule Lake, Lower Klamath Lake, Sheepy Lake, and Clear Lake. It was historically abundant in the basin. It was the most common food fish in the area, providing food for the Klamath and Modoc people, as well as local settlers, who also fed it to their livestock. It supported a cannery, which processed it for food and oil.

Today, the fish can be found in Upper Klamath Lake and its tributaries, Clear Lake and its tributaries, Tule Lake, part of the Lost River below the Anderson-Rose Dam, and part of the Klamath River. Its range declined as dams were built, flows were diverted, marshes were dredged and drained, and exotic species were introduced to the area. The landscape changed as it was altered for agriculture, livestock were transported in, trees were taken for timber, and riparian vegetation was cleared. Eutrophication occurred in Upper Klamath Lake, a major cause of the decline of this and other local fish, and a major reason why the sucker is not recovering.

== Conservation ==
Much of the sucker's spawning habitat was destroyed when the first dams were built. Dams also created habitat fragmentation and restricted the movement of the fish, isolating populations from one another. A number of water diversion projects reduced river flows, causing streams to become shallower and causing stagnation in some areas, possibly having a negative effect on the fish. Irrigation canals have been known to trap suckers, and their pumps can cause mortality. Fish larvae also become trapped.

About 70% of the wetlands surrounding Upper Klamath Lake have been impounded and drained, eliminating much of the habitat used by juvenile suckers during their development. Healthy wetlands also absorb contaminants such as phosphorus, which in excessive amounts causes blooms of organisms, especially the cyanobacterium Aphanizomenon flos-aquae. These blooms have led to sucker die-offs because the blooms deplete the dissolved oxygen in the water. The water quality in Upper Klamath Lake is poor, especially during the summer. While the sucker is relatively tolerant of poor water quality, compared to other fish, there is a history of multiple sucker die-offs.

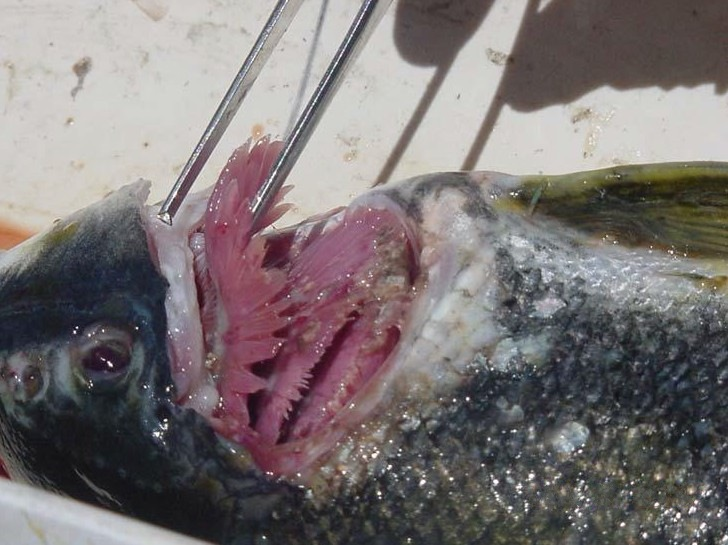
Gills infected with Flavobacterium columnare

Introduced fish species in the area include brown bullhead, fathead minnow, yellow perch, Sacramento perch, pumpkinseed, bluegill, green sunfish, largemouth bass, and brown trout. A number of these species readily feed upon juvenile suckers, especially the fathead minnow and yellow perch. These species may also compete with the sucker for food and space.

Pathogens may cause morbidity and mortality in the fish. Many have been observed with columnaris or "gill rot", a disease featuring lesions on the gills caused by Flavobacterium columnare. This is believed to be associated with lowered resistance to the bacterium from the fish, caused by ammonia-contaminated waters. Parasitism by a copepod in genus Lernea is becoming more common. This copepod feeds upon the living fish, causing wounds.

Conservation efforts include habitat restoration projects, hundreds of which have been started in the Upper Klamath Basin. It is too early to know whether these interventions will increase populations of the sucker.
