= Merel S. Sager =

American architect

- Born: September 25, 1899; Tiffin, Ohio
- Died: June 1982 (aged 82)
- Occupation: Architect

Merel S. Sager (September 25, 1899 – June 1982) was an American architect and landscape architect. He was employed by the National Park Service where he was a pioneer the form of "rustic architecture" that became known as "National Park Service rustic" architecture. He began working for the Park Service in 1928 and became its Chief Landscape Architect.

Sager was born and raised in Tiffin, Ohio. He received a master's degree from Harvard University's School of Landscape Architecture in 1928 and was hired by the National Park Service. By 1930, he had moved to San Francisco. He was assigned to the Western Division and was given responsibility in the 1930s for Sequoia National Park, the General Grant Grove of giant sequoias, Lassen Volcanic National Park, and Crater Lake National Park. He later assumed responsibility for the Hawaiʻi Volcanoes National Park as well.

Sager's works include the Moro Rock Stairway, several structures at Giant Forest Village-Camp Kaweah Historic District (1926-1927) in Sequoia National Park, and the House of the Sun Visitor Center at that Crater Historic District in Haleakala National Park. In the early 1930s, he was also the assistant park architect at Crater Lake National Park. In 1933, he prepared a general plan for the Crater Lake headquarters area. His works at Crater Lake include the Sinnott Memorial Observation Station, Watchman Lookout Station, Comfort Station No. 72, and structures in the Munson Valley and Rim Village Historic Districts.

At the time of the 1930 U.S. Census, he was living as a boarder in a home in San Francisco. He was identified as a landscape architect.

As of 1933, he was an associate landscape architect with the National Park Service, Branch of Plans and Design, Western Division.

In October 1933, he arrived in Hawaii where he worked on landscaping and beautification of federal highways and roads in national parks on the islands of Oahu, Hawaii, and Maui. He was transferred back to the mainland in 1936.

At the time of the 1940 U.S. Census, he was living as a lodger at the Kilauea Volcano House in Hawaii. He was identified as a landscape architect with the Civilian Conservation Corps.

== See also ==
- Architects of the National Park Service
