= Rim Village Historic District =

Historic district in Oregon, United States

- U.S. National Register of Historic Places
- U.S. Historic district
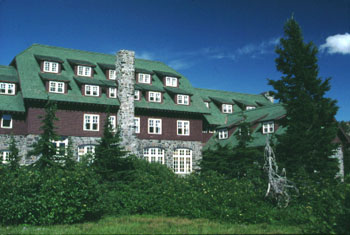
- The Crater Lake Lodge in Rim Village.
- Location: Crater Lake National Park, Oregon
- Nearest city: Fort Klamath, Oregon
- Coordinates: 42°54′36″N 122°08′36″W
- Area: 38 acres (15 ha)
- Built: 1909
- Architect: Charles Puchard, Jr., Thomas Vint
- Architectural style: National Park Service rustic
- MPS: Crater Lake National Park MRA
- NRHP reference No.: 97001155
- Added to NRHP: September 18, 1997

Rim Village is the main area for tourist services in Crater Lake National Park in southern Oregon, United States. It is located on the southwest rim of the caldera overlooking Crater Lake. The National Park Service designed Rim Village to concentrate park services at a location that provided easy access to rim trails and view points. Because of the unique rustic architecture of the Rim Village structures and the surrounding park landscape, the area was listed as Rim Village Historic District on the National Register of Historic Places in 1997.

== Early history ==
Crater Lake lies inside a caldera created 7,700 years ago when the 12,000 feet (3,658 m) high Mount Mazama collapsed following a large volcanic eruption. Over the following millennium, the caldera was filled with rain water forming today's lake. The Klamath Indians revered Crater Lake for its deep blue waters. In 1853, three gold miners found the lake, and named it Deep Blue Lake. However, because the lake was so high in the Cascade Mountains the discovery was soon forgotten.

In 1886, Captain Clarence Dutton, commander of a United States Geological Survey party, carried a half-ton survey boat, the Cleetwood, up the steep mountain slope and lowered it 2,000 feet (610 m) into the lake. From the Cleetwood, Dutton used piano wire to measure the depth of the lake at 168 different points. The survey team determined the lake was 1,996 feet (608 m) deep. This is surprisingly close to the modern sonar based readings made in 1959 that established the lake's deepest point at 1,932 feet (589 m).

William Gladstone Steel accompanied Dutton to Crater Lake in 1886. He named many of the lake's landmarks including Wizard Island, Llao Rock, and Skell Head, and participated in lake surveys that provided scientific evidence of the lake's uniqueness. After his return, he began advocating that Crater Lake be established as a national park.

== Park history ==
On 22 May 1902, President Theodore Roosevelt signed the bill making Crater Lake the Nation's sixth national park. The United States Department of Interior was charged with developing road access and visitor services for the park. This was a difficult job because of the park's remote location at the summit of the Cascade Mountains. By 1905, a "steep and tortuous" road leading to the crater rim was completed. This access road was essential for the development of the Rim Village area.

In 1905, William Gladstone Steel brought professional photographer Frederick H. Kiser to Crater Lake. Many of the early photographs of the park are Kiser's work. In 1907, Steel established the Crater Lake Company to run "Camp Crater" which provided park visitors with basic services.

Crater Lake Lodge was the first major building constructed in the area that is now Rim Village. It was begun in 1909 by the Crater Lake Company. The lodge was located close to the edge of the rim to ensure visitors had views of the lake and the surrounding caldera. Because of the remote location and short construction season, the lodge was not finished until 1915.

The National Park Service was established in 1916. This was an important step toward creating long-term development plans for National Parks like Crater Lake. In addition to establishing the National Park Service, the United States Congress began appropriating funds for various park projects. However, the United States' entry into World War I slowed development of the park's infrastructure.

After the war, the Army Corps of Engineers built several hiking trails radiating out from the lodge area. This allowed park visitors to make day-trip to Watchman Peak on the west rim and Garfield Peak on the south rim, and return to the lodge by evening. In 1921, Fred Kiser was given permission to construct a stone building near the edge of the rim where he could sell his hand colored photographs of Crater Lake. By 1924, a number of amenities were available in the "Village" area. These included the lodge, a public campground, Kiser's studio, a park community center for special programs, and public comfort stations.

== Village development ==
By 1927, the area around the lodge was called "Rim Village" by both visitors and park staff. The National Park Service approved a master plan for development of Rim Village in 1927, and Congress provided funds to begin implementing the plan. The development program was overseen by the National Park Service's Landscape Engineering Division, headed by Thomas C. Vint. Over the next fourteen years, Crater Lake's infrastructure was developed in accordance with the park's master plan. As a result, park buildings from this era reflect a common character consistent with National Park Service's rustic design style.

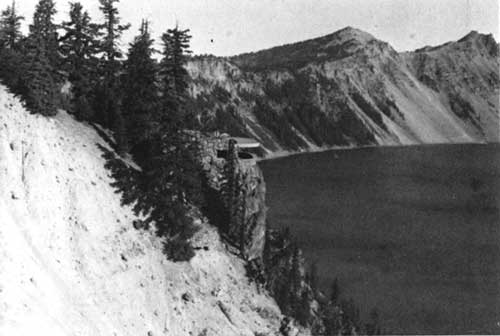
Sinnott Memorial Observation Station overlooking Crater Lake

Rim Village was developed in two phases. The first phase, between 1927 and 1932, included road improvements, new rustic style buildings, a paved strolling path along the rim, and careful landscape plantings. Housekeeping cabins, a general store, a cafeteria, and the Sinnott Memorial Observation Station were all built during this period. These upgrades were accomplished by National Park Service staff and contract labor. The second phase of development, between 1933 and 1941, was accomplished with the help of the Civilian Conservation Corps. During this time, there were two Civilian Conservation Corps camps in the park, with more than four hundred men. The Civilian Conservation Corps worked on facility construction projects, did landscape work, improved existing roads, built new trails, and performed general maintenance throughout the park. Their work on the heavily used Rim Village campground was particularly important. For the first time, the campground was organized around a formal internal circulation plan that controlled the flow of people and automobiles within the campground. In addition, individual camp sites were marked and rustic-style picnic tables, benches, and fireplaces were built. This significantly reduced the impact of visitors on the campground's natural environment.

Development at Rim Village was curtailed during World War II. Maintenance became the primary concern of the park staff, as Civilian Conservation Corps manpower disappeared with the onset of the war. This began a period of decline in Rim Village.

In 1955, the National Park Service implemented a new program to restore park facilities throughout the nation. The program's main thrust was to standardize national park facilities across the country. In Rim Village, some rustic features were replaced or covered over in the effort to modernize park facilities and original landscape elements were altered or removed. Later the Rim Village campground was removed entirely and the site converted into a day-use picnic area. The rustic tables and fireplaces were replaced with more contemporary models.

Despite the changes, the design features of the original master plan still dominate Rim Village. The main buildings, general landscape, pathways, and rim trails remain consistent with the original design. As a result, Rim Village was listed as a historic district on the National Register of Historic Places in 1997 (NRHP #97001155).

== Structures ==
There are six primary buildings in the Rim Village Historic District. Five of them are original structures; however, all six reflect the rustic style of architecture which is the common design theme that makes the Rim Village historically unique.

Crater Lake Lodge is located at the east end of Rim Village. It was built by a private developer between 1909 and 1915. The lodge was expanded in 1922. The National Park Service acquired the lodge in 1967. It was completely reconstructed in 1991. The lodge was listed on the National Register of Historic Places in 1981 (NRHP #81000096).

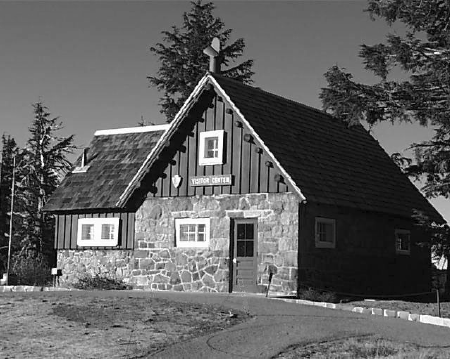
Kiser Studio in Rim Village Historic District, 2002

The Kiser Studio was constructed in 1921. It was originally a private studio where photographer Fred Kiser displayed and sold park photographs, painting, and postcards. The National Park Service took over the building in 1929 to use as an exhibit hall. Today, it is the park's summer visitor center.

The Sinnott Memorial Observation Station was built into the caldera cliff overlooking the lake. The structure was designed by landscape architect Merel S. Sager, a pioneer of the rustic style of park architecture. The building includes a small natural history museum with exhibits that highlight the geologic history of Mount Mazama and the formation of Crater Lake. The building was officially dedicated on 16 July 1931 as the Nicholas J. Sinnott Memorial Observation Station and Museum. The Sinnott Memorial was listed on the National Register of Historic Places in 1988 (NRHP #88002623).

The park's public Cafeteria and Gift Shop was built in 1928. The cafeteria was renovated in 1956 and 1970. In 2007, the original cafeteria was torn down and replaced with a modern dining facility designed in the rustic style so it remains consistent with the character of the historic districts.

The Community House was built in 1924. It was used for park programs until 1989. The National Park Service considered demolishing the building, but decided to renovate it instead. It was returned to its historic use in 2001.

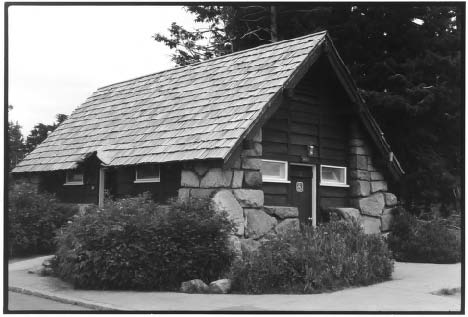
Plaza Comfort Station in Rim Village Historic District

The Plaza Comfort Station (building 68) was built in 1938 to provide public showers, restrooms, and general services to park visitors. It is located on the east side of the Rim Village plaza area. The building is a one-story, wood-frame structure with heavy native stone applied to the exterior. The Plaza Comfort Station was listed on the National Register of Historic Places in 1988 as Comfort Station No. 68 (NRHP #88002624).

In addition to the six main buildings there are several secondary buildings in the Rim Village Historic District. Significant among these minor buildings is Comfort Station #4 (building 72). It is an original building constructed in the early 1930s. This building was listed on the National Register of Historic Places in 1988 as Comfort Station No. 72 (NRHP #88002625). The building remains an important part of the Rim Village landscape, despite minor alterations made to the structure when it was converted from a comfort station to an electrical transformer vault.

== Roads and pathways ==
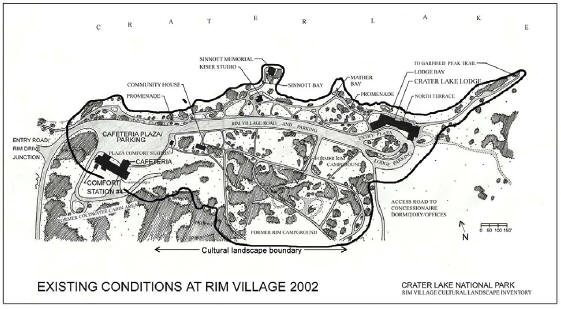
Rim Village Historic District in Crater Lake National Park, 2002

Today, the Rim Village roads and pathways still follow the original design. Rim Village has approximately one-half mile of roadway plus several parking areas. The historic district also has over 1,450 feet (442 m) of stone walls and rustic stone masonry observation points that were constructed as part of the original Rim Village master plan.

Pathways are located throughout Rim Village to provide pedestrian access to the rim viewing areas, buildings and parking lots. The main pedestrian paths have not changed from the original Rim Village design. The most important path is the "Rim Promenade" constructed between 1928 and 1932. It follows the crater rim approximately 2,500 feet (762 m) from the Garfield Peak trailhead east of Crater Lake Lodge to a point at the west end of Rim Village. View points along the Promenade provide excellent vistas of Crater Lake's blue water, Wizard Island, and the 1,000-foot (300 m) high caldera walls that surround the lake. Various spur pathways provide access to the Crater Lake Lodge, Sinnott Memorial, Rim Village Plaza, and parking areas.

== Access ==
Rim Village is located in the Cascade Mountains, 7,100 feet (2,164 m) above sea level. In the Rim Village area, winter lasts eight months with an average snowfall of 533 inches (13.5 m) per year, and many snow banks remain well into the summer. While access to the Rim Village is normally year-round, the cafeteria and gift shop are the only facilities open in winter. During the winter months, park rangers led snowshoe walks on weekends and holidays. In the summer, rangers offer daily programs that highlight the geologic history of Mount Mazama, the formation of Crater Lake, the lake's unique nature features, the science behind the lake's blue water, and park history.
