= Crater Lake Lodge =

- U.S. National Register of Historic Places
- U.S. Historic district – Contributing property
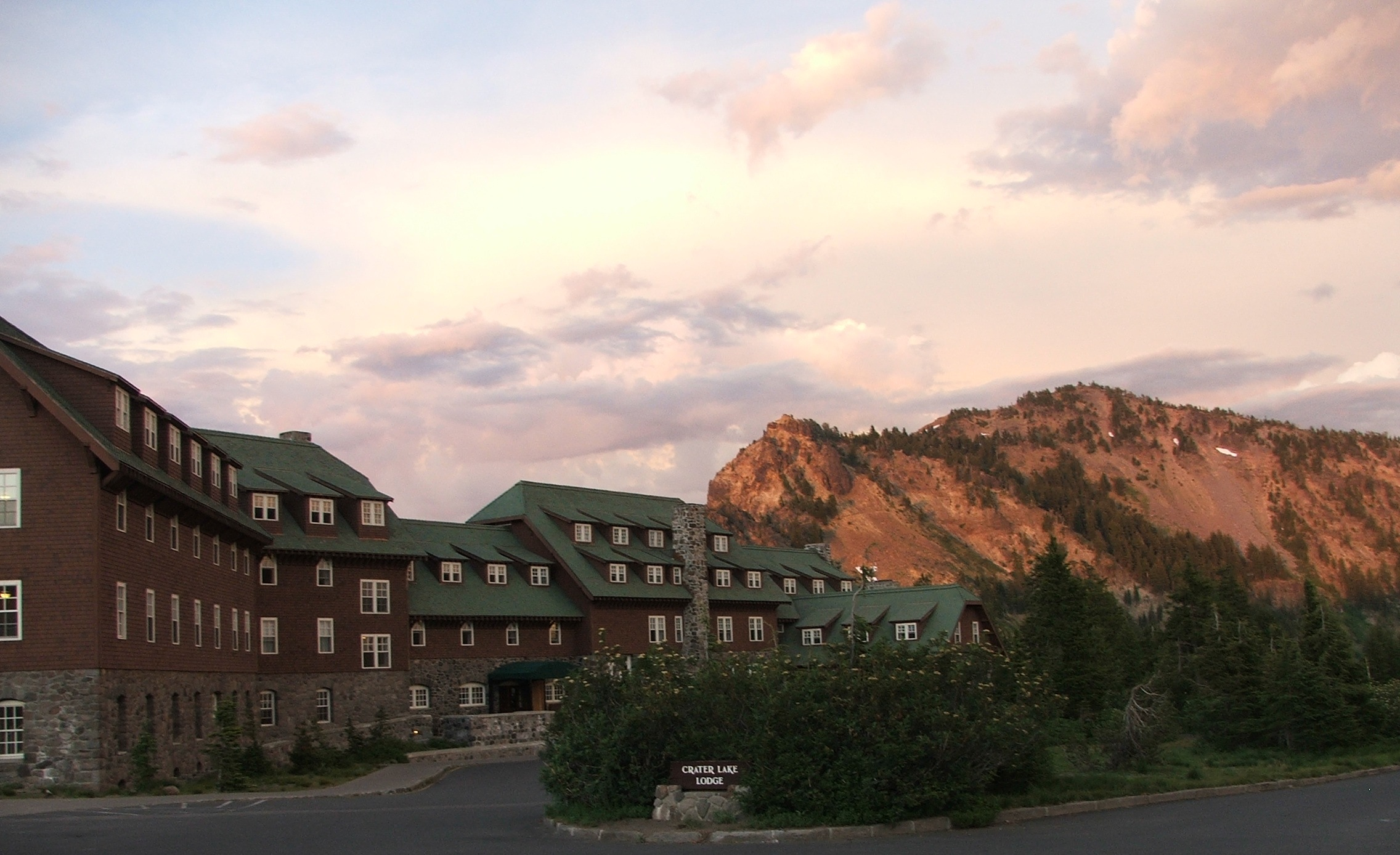
- The lodge in 2007

- Location within Oregon
- Location: Crater Lake National Park, Oregon
- Nearest city: Fort Klamath, Oregon
- Coordinates: 42°54′35″N 122°08′27″W
- Built: 1915
- Built by: Crater Lake Co.
- Architect: R.N. Hockenberry & Co.
- Architectural style: National Park Service rustic
- Part of: Rim Village Historic District (ID97001155)
- NRHP reference No.: 81000096
- Added to NRHP: May 5, 1981

Crater Lake Lodge is a hotel built in 1915 to provide overnight accommodations for visitors to Crater Lake National Park in southern Oregon, US. The lodge is located on the southwest rim of the Crater Lake caldera overlooking the lake 1,000 feet (300 m) below. The lodge is owned by the National Park Service, and is listed on the National Register of Historic Places. As of 2024, the hotel is a Historic Hotels of America program member, and has been so since 2012.

== Local history ==
Crater Lake lies inside a caldera created 7,700 years ago when the 12,000-foot (3,700 m)-high Mount Mazama collapsed following a large volcanic eruption. Over the following millennium, the caldera was filled with rain water forming today's lake. The Klamath Indians revered Crater Lake for its deep blue waters. In 1853, three gold miners found the lake. They named it Deep Blue Lake, but because the lake was so high in the Cascade Range the discovery was soon forgotten.

In 1886, Captain Clarence Dutton led a United States Geological Survey party to Crater Lake. Dutton's team carried a half-ton survey boat, the Cleetwood, up the steep mountain slope and lowered it 2,000 feet (610 m) into the lake. From the Cleetwood, Dutton used piano wire to measure the depth of the lake at 168 different points. The survey team determined the lake was 1,996 feet (608 m) deep. This is surprisingly close to the modern sonar-based readings made in 1959 that established the lake's deepest point at 1,932 feet (589 m).

William Gladstone Steel accompanied the Dutton party in 1886. He named many of the lake's landmarks including Wizard Island, Llao Rock, and Skell Head, and participated in lake surveys that provided scientific evidence of the lake's uniqueness. After he returned, Steel began advocating that Crater Lake be established as a national park. On 22 May 1902, President Theodore Roosevelt signed a bill making Crater Lake the United States' sixth national park. The idea of building a guest lodge at Crater Lake was first raised by Steel shortly after the park was established.

== Construction ==
In 1909, Steel finally convinced a Portland developer, Alfred Parkhurst, to build a lodge on the rim above Crater Lake. The average winter snowfall at Crater Lake is 533 inches (13.5 m). As a result, the lodge structure was required to carry an extremely heavy snow load for up to eight months every year. Neither Parkhurst or the project's architects R. N. Hockenberry & Company had experience building structures in a demanding environment like the Crater Lake rim site. In addition, building materials had to be trucked to the site over very poor park roads, and the construction season was limited to only three summer months. These factors combined to slow construction and drive up project costs. To compensate, Parkhurst kept the structure very simple. For example, the exterior was covered in tar-paper and the interior walls were finished with a thin cardboard-like wallboard called "beaver board." The lodge had no private bathrooms and the only electricity came from a small generator.

== Early development ==
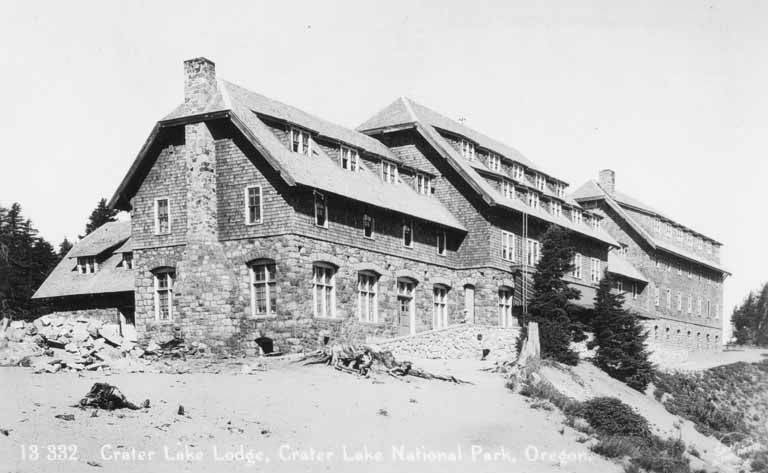
Photograph of the lodge taken between 1915 and 1920.

When Crater Lake Lodge opened in 1915, it drew many visitors despite the lack of amenities. The views of Crater Lake and the surrounding peaks of the Cascade Mountains kept a steady flow of visitor coming to the lodge.

In 1922, a two-year facility upgrade project was begun. The project doubled the number of guest rooms, and added private bathrooms in the lodge's new wing. However, lack of money left many of the new rooms unfinished. The number of visitors to the park decreased during the Great Depression, and the lodge suffered financially from the decline in visitation. As a result, very little was spent on facility maintenance. However, the guest rooms on the second and third floors were finished in the mid-1930s.

Over the years, cars had destroyed most of the vegetation around the lodge. During the 1930s, the Civilian Conservation Corps built Rim Village adjacent to the lodge. Their work included landscaping around the lodge, something the privately operated lodge could not afford to do on its own. The new landscape included hundreds of indigenous trees and shrubs that helped blend the lodge structure into its surroundings environment. In addition, the National Park Service paved the lodge parking areas and adjacent walkways. This significantly reduced the dust and erosion problems around the building.

During World War II, both Crater Lake National Park and the Crater Lake Lodge were closed to the public. After the war, park visitation increased dramatically and the lodge benefited from the increase in tourism. The National Park Service continually pushed the lodge operator to upgrade the facility, but little was done to maintain the structure beyond basic utilities maintenance and required fire safety measures. Eventually, cables had to be stretched between the north and south walls to keep them from bowing.

== National Park Service ownership ==
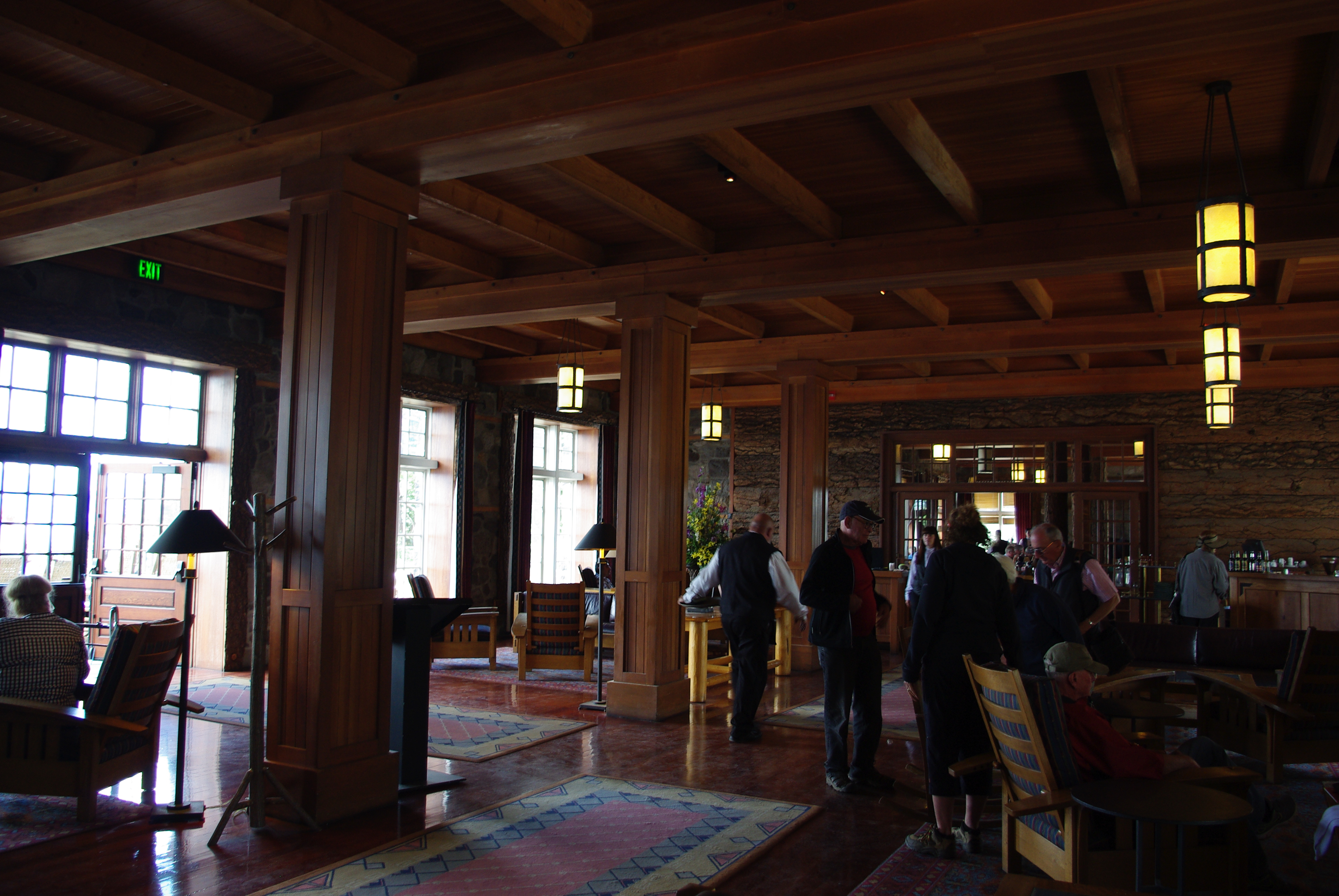
The lodge's lounge

In 1967, the National Park Service acquired the Crater Lake Lodge. The lodge was listed on the National Register of Historic Places in 1981. The lodge was documented in 1981 by the Historic American Buildings Survey, which produced a set of measured drawings. However, the building continued to deteriorate due to lack of funds. Despite being listed on the National Register of Historic Places, the National Park Service felt restoring the old building was too costly so it was scheduled to be demolished. The decision was later reversed due to public opposition. In 1988, the National Park Service approved a plan to rebuild the lodge as part of the comprehensive Rim Village redevelopment program.

In the spring of 1989, just before the lodge was to open for its summer season, structural engineers advised the National Park Service that the Great Hall was unsafe. It was so unstable they feared it might collapse from its own weight, bringing down the rest of the lodge with it. This forced the National Park Service to close the lodge pending renovation. After two years of planning, construction began in 1991. Some original materials were salvaged for reuse, but most of the original building had deteriorated to the point it could not be saved or reused. However, the Great Hall was carefully dismantled. The rest of the building was gutted and a steel support structure, modern utilities and fire suppression system were installed, and guest rooms were upgraded to modern hotel standards. The renovation was completed in the fall of 1994 at a cost of $15 million (equivalent to $33 million in 2025). On May 20, 1995, Crater Lake Lodge reopened to the public.

As of 2007, according to the operator the Great Hall had been completely restored, and the lodge's dining room overlooking the lake was in operation. An exhibit room just off the lobby provided information about the history of the lodge, Crater Lake, and the park. The lodge then had 71 rooms.

It was operated by Xanterra Parks and Resorts (formerly Amfac Resorts) from 2002 to 2018. Aramark took over operations in 2018.

In 2012 the hotel became a member of Historic Hotels of America, a program of the National Trust for Historic Preservation, and it remains a member as of 2024.
