= Watchman Lookout Station =

- U.S. National Register of Historic Places
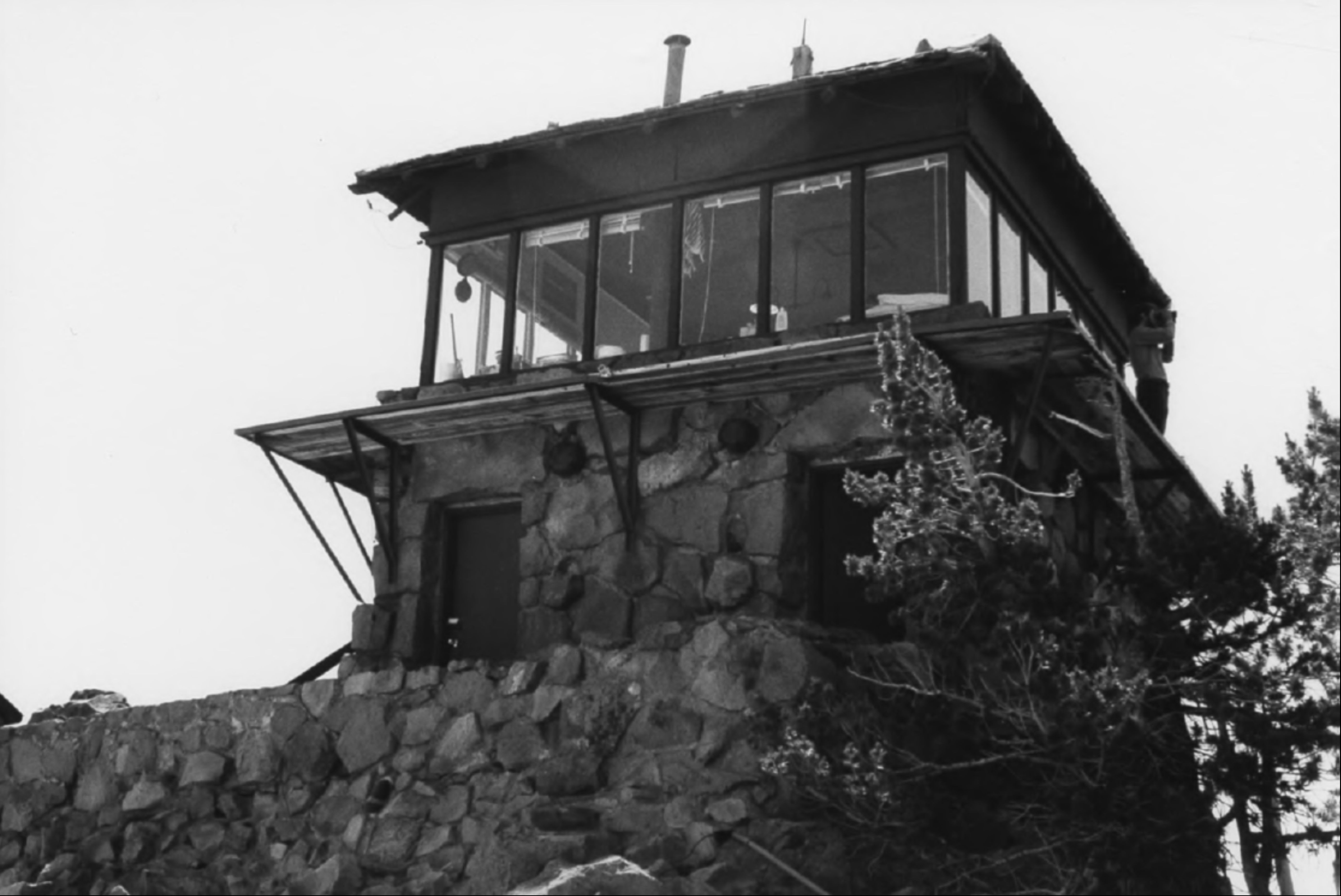
- Location: Crater Lake National Park, Oregon
- Nearest city: Fort Klamath, Oregon
- Coordinates: 42°56′35″N 122°10′21″W
- Built: 1932
- Architect: National Park Service, Merel S. Sager
- Architectural style: National Park Service rustic
- MPS: Crater Lake National Park MRA
- NRHP reference No.: 88002626
- Added to NRHP: December 1, 1988

The Watchman Lookout Station No. 168 is one of two fire lookout towers in Crater Lake National Park in southern Oregon. For many years, National Park Service personnel used the lookout to watch for wildfires during the summer months. It is also a common hiking destination because of its views of Crater Lake and the surrounding area. The building is unusual because it serves the dual purpose of fire lookout and museum. The Watchman Lookout Station is listed on the National Register of Historic Places.

== History ==
The Watchman Lookout Station is located 8,025 feet above sea level on Watchman Peak, a high point on the western rim above Crater Lake. Watchman Peak was named by William Gladstone Steel in 1886 when he brought a survey team to Crater Lake to measure its depth. The lookout structure (designated "Building 168") was constructed in 1932, and served the dual purpose of fire lookout and trail museum. The lookout location was selected by Merel S. Sager of the National Park Service Landscape Division.

Early detection and prompt suppression of forest fires was a primary responsibility of the National Park Service. Lookouts, like the one on Watchman Peak, were located on heights overlooking great expanses of forest area. The Watchman tower was part of the fire detection network for Crater Lake National Park which included a number of National Park Service, United States Forest Service and Bureau of Indian Affairs lookouts. A trained observer, usually a park ranger, staffed the lookout and kept in contact with the fire dispatcher at the park headquarters on short-wave radio. During the 1930s, the Civilian Conservation Corps also provided observers. The National Park Service staffed the Watchman Lookout Station during fire season until 1974 and intermittently since then.

Today, the Watchman Lookout Station has significant interpretive value. Since the lookout was built, there has been a major philosophical change in how forest managers deal with wildfires. The Watchman tower provides visitors the opportunity to experience the essential elements of 1930s-era fire lookout. The accessibility of the site, the unobstructed view on all sides, and the use of native materials that blend the structure into the surrounding landscape combine to make the Watchman Lookout Station a unique and historically significant structure. As a result, it was listed on the National Register of Historic Places in 1988.

== Structure ==
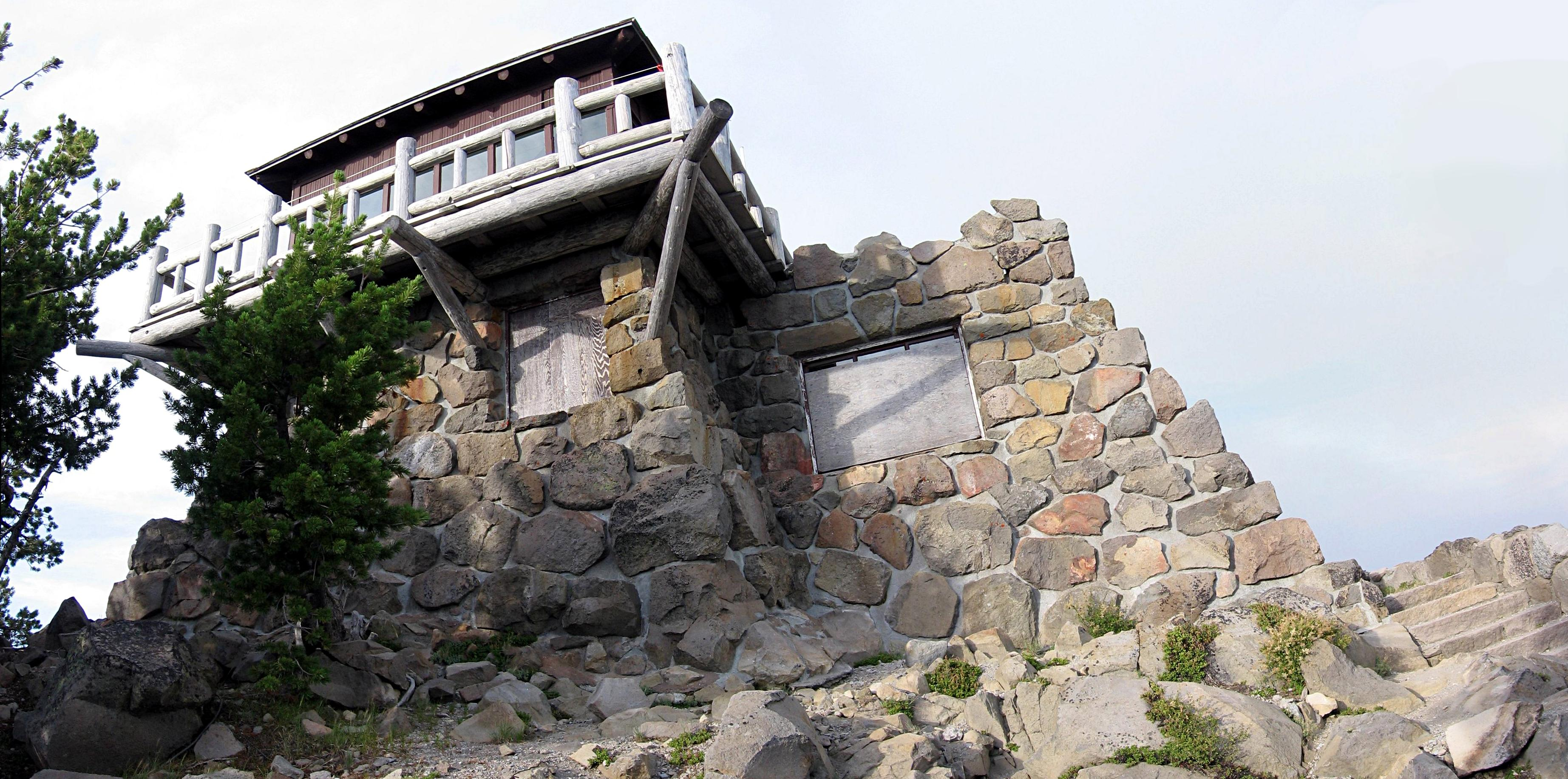
Massive masonry walls on Watchman Lookout

The lookout is a simple two-story blockhouse design with a 14 feet (4.3 m) by 20 feet (6.1 m) wing extending east from the southeast corner of the main structure. The bottom floor of the main building has a 17 feet (5.2 m) by 17 feet (5.2 m) footprint. The first floor is constructed with massive stone masonry walls. It originally houses a small exhibit room. The exhibit area was unusual for a working fire lookout. However, because it was readily accessibility to visitors, the Watchman lookout provided an opportunity for the National Park Service to educate the public about the park and its fire prevention program. The first floor also has a restroom and storage area. An eight-foot glass window provides views of Crater Lake.

The second floor is a four-sided observation room entirely enclosed in glass with a 17 feet (5.2 m) by 17 feet (5.2 m) catwalk around the outside. The first floor was built into the hill-top so the building's footprint is somewhat irregular. Therefore, the lookout's second story is supported by a steel frame rather than resting entirely on the first floor structure. The lookout's native stone and log construction helps blend the structure into its mountain top environment. There is also a stone parapet in front of building that overlooks Crater Lake, 1,849 feet below.

== Watchman trail ==
The trail to Watchman Lookout Station is approximately three-quarters of a mile up a modest grade. To reach the trailhead from Crater Lake National Park's Rim Village, take Rim Drive north 4 miles to a well marked pull-off parking area. The trail begins about 100 yards south of the parking area. The trail is normally open from mid-July through October.

== See also ==
- Firefighting in Oregon
