= Comfort Station No. 68 =

- U.S. National Register of Historic Places
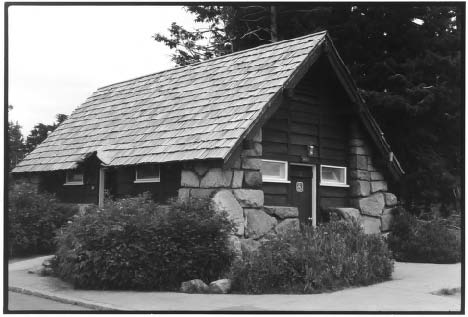
- Plaza Comfort Station in Rim Village
- Location: Crater Lake National Park
- Nearest city: Klamath Falls, Oregon, USA
- Coordinates: 42°54′40″N 122°08′45″W
- Built: 1938
- Architectural style: National Park Rustic
- NRHP reference No.: 88002624
- Added to NRHP: 1988

Comfort Station No. 68 (or Plaza Comfort Station) is a historic visitor services building in Crater Lake National Park in southern Oregon, United States. It was built in 1938 to provide a public toilet and shower facilities for park visitors. It was constructed in the National Park Service Rustic style of architecture, and was listed on the National Register of Historic Places in 1988.

== Structure ==
The Plaza Comfort Station (building 68) is located in Rim Village in Crater Lake National Park. It was built to provide public showers and restrooms for park visitors. It is located on the east side of the Rim Village plaza area.

The building is a one-story, wood-frame structure with native stones applied to the exterior. The structure rests on a stone foundation. It has a wooden-shake roof with extended eaves and exposed rafter at each end. Entrances are centered on the gable ends with windows on the north and south side. The original design included a central stone chimney, however, that feature was removed. Despite the alteration, the Plaza Comfort Station retains its original rustic character. Today, it is one of the main buildings in the Rim Village plaza area. In 1988, the Plaza Comfort Station was listed on the National Register of Historic Places as Comfort Station No. 68 (NRHP #88002624).

== History ==
On May 22, 1902, President Theodore Roosevelt signed the bill making Crater Lake the nation's sixth national park. The United States Department of the Interior was charged with developing visitor services in the park. The National Park Service approved a master plan for development of Rim Village in 1927. Implementation of the plan was overseen by the National Park Service's Landscape Engineering Division, headed by Thomas C. Vint. Over the next fourteen years, Crater Lake's infrastructure was developed in accordance with the park's master plan. As a result, park buildings from this era reflect a common character consistent with National Park Service's rustic design style. The Plaza Comfort Station was an element of the master plan.

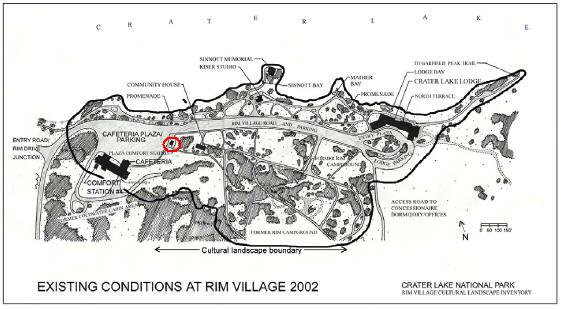
Plaza Comfort Station in Rim Village Historic District

Between 1933 and 1941, the Civilian Conservation Corps maintained two work camps in Crater Lake National Park. Civilian Conservation Corps personnel worked on facility construction projects throughout the park. The Plaza Comfort Station was one of the Rim Village buildings they constructed with the help of park staff. The building was completed in 1938.

Today, the Plaza Comfort Station is one of the six main buildings in Rim Village. Five of these are original structures; however, all six reflect the rustic style of architecture which is the common design theme that makes the Rim Village historically unique. Because these structures still reflect the rustic design character of the original National Park Service master plan, Rim Village was listed as a historic district on the National Register of Historic Places in 1997.

== Access ==
Rim Village is located high in the Cascade Mountains, 7,100 feet (2,164 m) above sea level. In the Rim Village area, winter lasts eight months. While access to the Rim Village is normally year-round, the Plaza Comfort Station is only open during the summer months due to the heavy winter snowfall that averages 533 inches (1,354 cm) per year.
