= Shadow Mountain Lookout =

- U.S. National Register of Historic Places
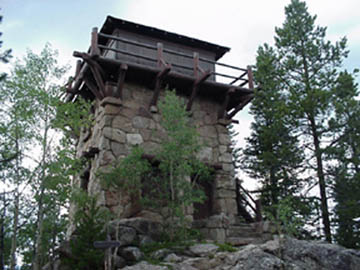
- Front of the lookout

- Location within Colorado Location within the United States
- Nearest city: Grand Lake, Colorado
- Coordinates: 40°13′50″N 105°48′52″W
- Built: 1932
- Architect: NPS Landscape Architecture Division
- MPS: Rocky Mountain National Park MRA (AD)
- NRHP reference No.: 78000279
- Added to NRHP: August 2, 1978

The Shadow Mountain Lookout, also known as the Shadow Mountain Patrol Cabin, was built in Rocky Mountain National Park in 1932, to the design of the National Park Service San Francisco Landscape Architecture Division. It was regarded as one of the best National Park Service Rustic buildings in the national park system. It is now the only fire lookout surviving in Rocky Mountain National Park. Three other lookouts, now gone, were located at Twin Sisters Peak, the north fork of the Thompson River and near Long's Peak. The lookout was built by Civilian Conservation Corps labor.

Situated at an elevation of 9923 feet, the lookout is a three-story structure, with the first two stories in stone masonry, appearing to grow from a rock outcropping. The frame third story is topped by a pyramidal roof. The structure is near the summit of Shadow Mountain, looking over Grand Lake. The first floor has been used for visitor contact, while the second floor has been used as employee accommodation, usually for a married couple who would keep watch and deal with the public. The last summer season for use was 1978.

== See also ==
- National Register of Historic Places listings in Grand County, Colorado
