= Crater Historic District =

Historic district in Hawaii, United States

- U.S. National Register of Historic Places
- U.S. Historic district
- Hawaiʻi Register of Historic Places
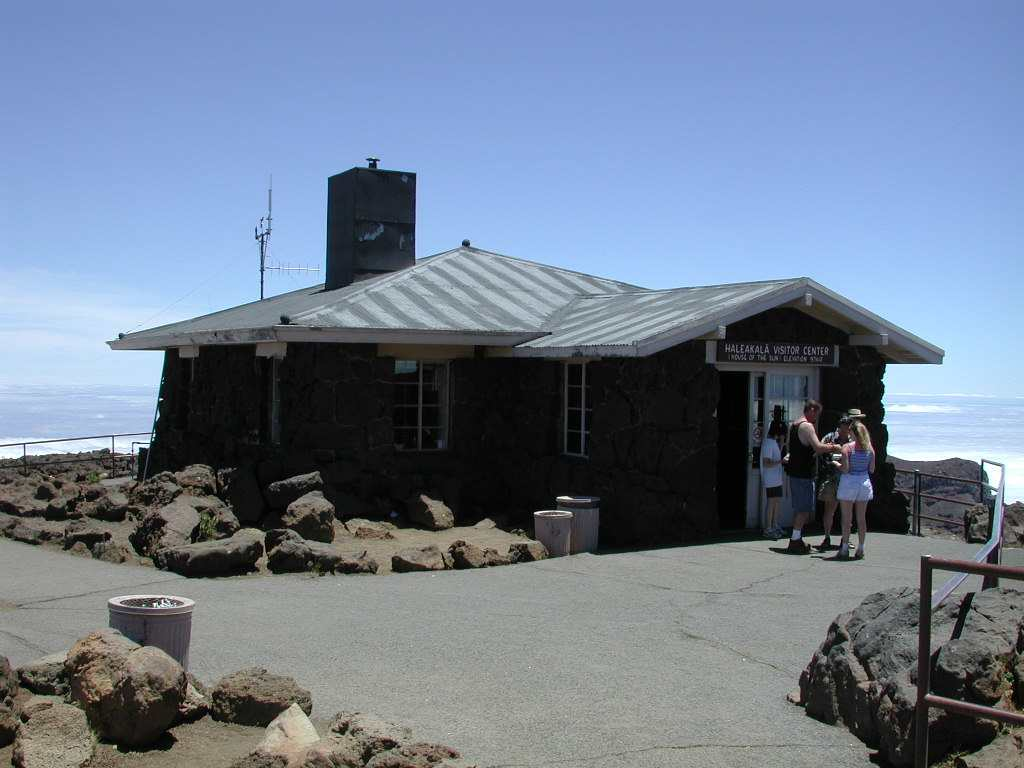
- House of the Sun Visitor Center

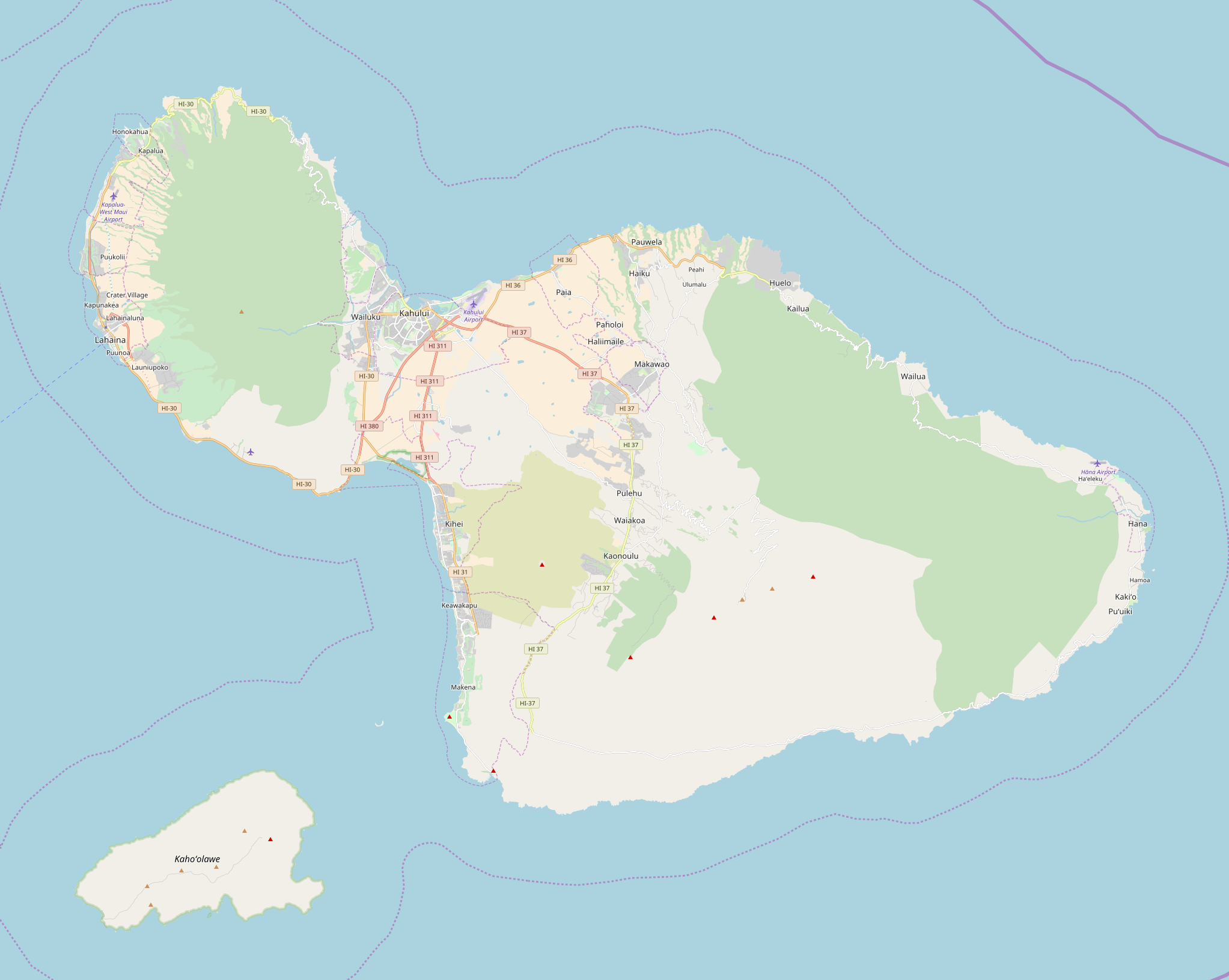
- Location within Maui Location within Hawaii
- Location: Address restricted
- Nearest city: Kahului, Hawaii
- Built: AD 800
- NRHP reference No.: 74000289
- HRHP No.: 50-50-12-01739

Significant dates
- Added to NRHP: November 1, 1974
- Designated HRHP: January 1, 1992

The Crater Historic District encompasses National Park Service structures within Haleakala National Park. The buildings include utility structures, employee housing, administration and visitor services facilities. The Civilian Conservation Corps built most to standard Park Service designs in the 1930s. A few World War II era buildings survive from United States Army construction and are included in the historic district. The Crater Historic District was added to the National Register of Historic Places on November 1, 1974.

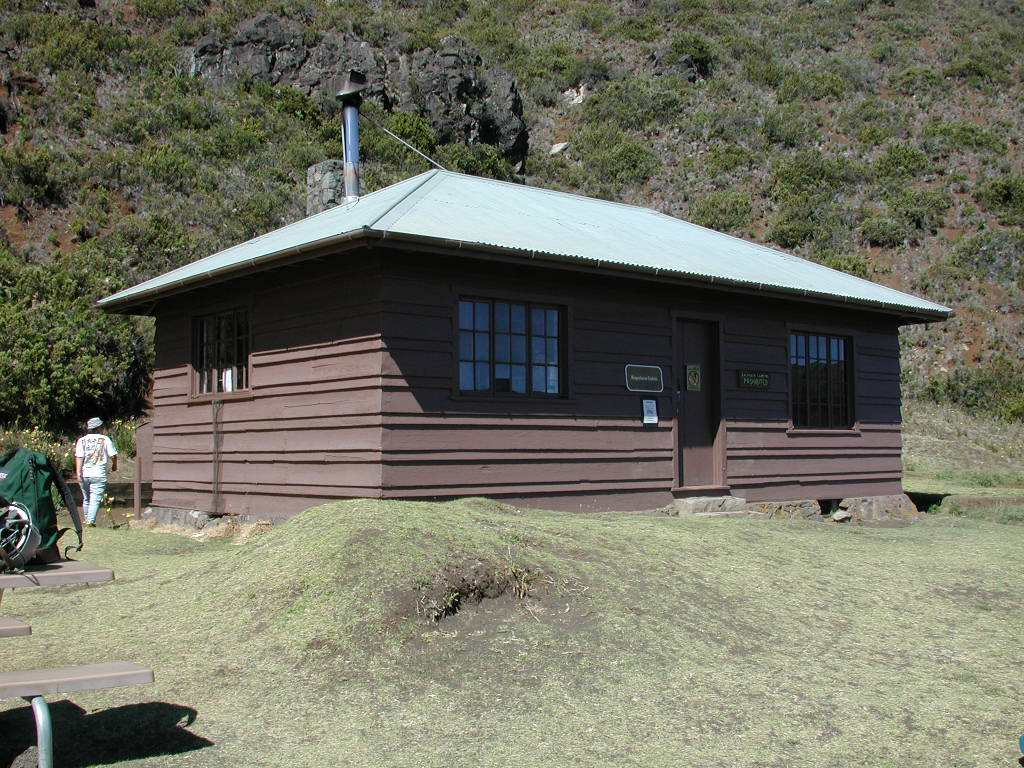
Kapalaoa Cabin

The Park Service adapted its preferred National Park Service rustic style to the Hawaiian Islands, avoiding the heavy log construction characteristic of the western continental United States parks in favor of a frame-construction interpretation for most buildings. The House of the Sun Visitor Center is the closest example of the mainland style of rubble construction with heavy framing. Designed by Park Service architect Merel Sager, it is also one of the few buildings that were not built with CCC labor.
