= Sinnott Memorial Observation Station =

Historic building in Oregon, U.S.

- Sinnott Memorial Building No. 67
- U.S. National Register of Historic Places
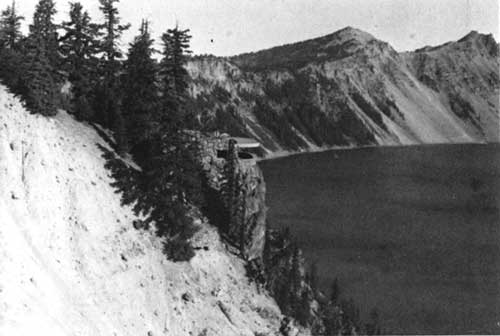
- Location: Crater Lake National Park, Oregon
- Nearest city: Fort Klamath, Oregon
- Coordinates: 42°54′41.72″N 122°08′34.15″W
- Built: 1931
- Architect: National Park Service, Merel Sager
- Architectural style: National Park Service Rustic
- MPS: Crater Lake National Park MRA
- NRHP reference No.: 88002623
- Added to NRHP: December 1, 1988

The Sinnott Memorial Observation Station is a sheltered viewpoint built into the caldera cliff 900 feet above Crater Lake in southern Oregon, United States. It is located near the Rim Village Visitor Center in Crater Lake National Park. The structure includes a small natural history museum with exhibits that highlight the geologic history of Mount Mazama and the formation of Crater Lake. The building was officially dedicated as the Nicholas J. Sinnott Memorial Observation Station and Museum; however, it is commonly known as the Sinnott Memorial Overlook or Sinnott Viewing Area. It is architecturally significant because it was the first National Park Service building constructed specifically as a museum and the first structure built in Crater Lake National Park using rustic stone masonry construction. It is listed on the National Register of Historic Places as Sinnott Memorial Building No. 67.

== History ==
The Sinnott Memorial was funded by a $10,000 appropriation from the United States Congress. It was intended to honor Nicholas J. Sinnott who represented eastern Oregon in the United States House of Representatives from 1913 to 1928. As chairman of the House Public Lands Committee, Sinnott had actively supported Crater Lake National Park. He died in 1929 shortly after retiring from Congress. While the Sinnott Memorial was to serve as an observation point, Congress also intended the building to be a museum. In fact, it was the first museum building constructed in a national park at the specific direction of Congress.

The structure was designed by landscape architect Merel S. Sager, a pioneer of the rustic style of park architecture. To ensure a spectacular view, Sager chose a site on Victor Rock, 900 feet above the lake. Construction of the observation station began in the fall of 1930. During construction, Sager spent hours in a rowboat on the lake, ensuring the building blended perfectly into the caldera cliff. As a result, the building provides a spectacular view of Crater Lake and surrounding caldera and mountains, but is virtually invisible from the lake below. The building was finished the following summer. It was dedicated on July 16, 1931. Horace M. Albright, the director of the National Park Service, attended the dedication ceremony along with William Gladstone Steel and many other dignitaries. Once it was open, the public quickly made it one of Crater Lake's most popular viewing areas.

Prior to the park's centennial in 2003, the Sinnott Memorial Building was completely renovated and the museum exhibits updated. The new exhibits cost $425,000, and include easy-to-understand displays with a video program that shows how Mount Mazama was created, how the mountain collapsed, and how the lake formed.

== Structure ==
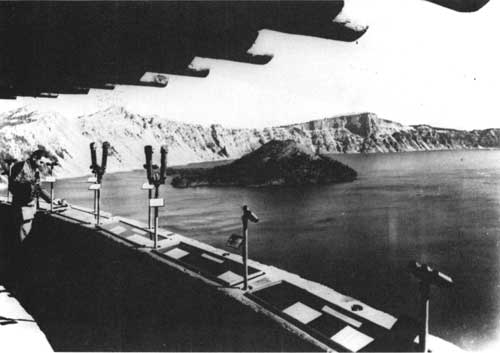
View of Wizard Island from Sinnott Memorial, 1938

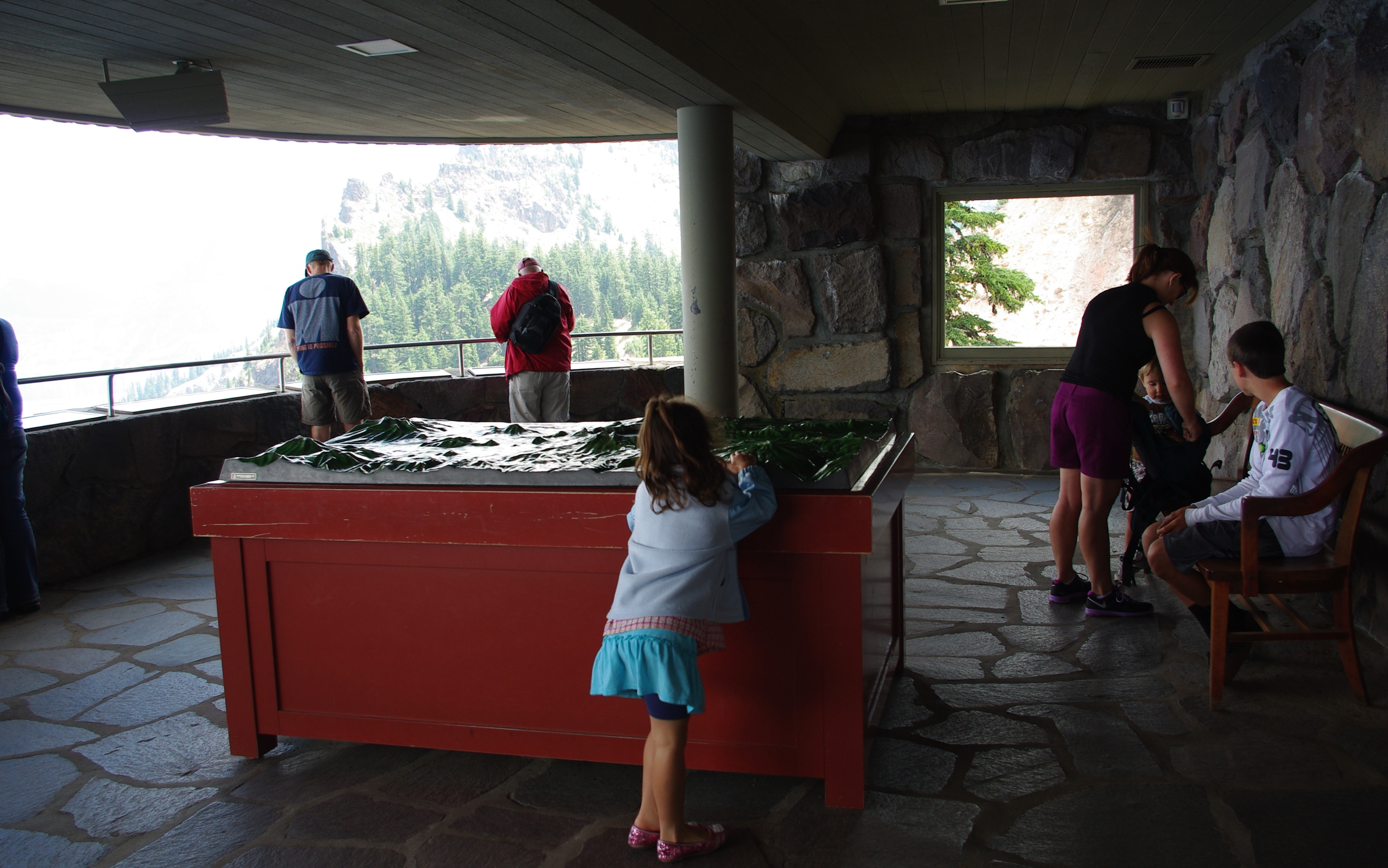
Interior of Sinnott Memorial, 2013

The Sinnott Memorial Observation Station is built on Victor Rock, an outcropping on the cliff face of Crater Lake's caldera wall, approximately 50 feet below the crest. The structure was the first in the park to use log and stone masonry construction. The structure's rustic style set the architectural standard for future buildings constructed at Crater Lake National Park.

To get to the Sinnott building, visitors follow a short, stairstep trail from Rim Village to the entrance. The entrance door opens to a 40 foot by 40 foot observation room. On the north side of the room, an open-air balcony offers visitors a spectacular view to the lake. The balcony is covered by a cantilever log roof. The museum exhibits are located in the center of the observation room and around the walls. The exhibits highlight the geologic history of Mount Mazama and the formation of Crater Lake. There is also a hidden 12 by 14 foot workroom adjacent to the museum space. A door on the east side of the room leads to the exit stairs which is hidden from view by a stone wall.

The building is constructed of heavy, native stone and concrete with log beams supporting the roof. The structure's footprint is somewhat irregular because the building was designed to merge the cliff. The stone walls are load-bearing with rough rock exposed on the outer walls to blend with the surrounding landscape.

In the 1930s, the building's roof was re-built with asphalt and lead flashing to stop leaking. In 1961, flagstone paving was added to the interior floor and the exterior entry patio area. The entire structure was renovated in 2003. Despite the changes required over the years, the National Park Service has been careful to maintain the rustic look of the building. Because of its architectural and historic significance, the Sinnott Memorial Building was listed on the National Register of Historic Places in 1988.
