= Comfort Station No. 72 =

- U.S. National Register of Historic Places
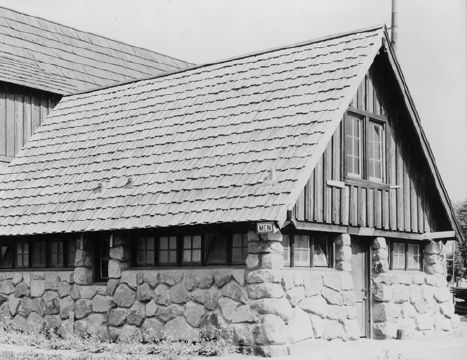
- Comfort Station #4 in Rim Village
- Location: Crater Lake National Park
- Nearest city: Klamath Falls, Oregon, USA
- Coordinates: 42°54′40″N 122°08′50″W
- Built: 1930
- Architectural style: National Park Rustic
- NRHP reference No.: 88002625
- Added to NRHP: 1988

Comfort Station No. 72 (also known as Comfort Station #4) is a historic visitor services building in Crater Lake National Park in southern Oregon, United States. It was built in 1930 to provide a public toilet and shower facilities for park visitors. It was constructed in the National Park Service Rustic style of architecture, and was listed on the National Register of Historic Places in 1988.

== Structure ==
The Comfort Station #4 (building 72) is located in Rim Village in Crater Lake National Park. It was built to provide public showers and restrooms for park visitors. It is located on the southwest side of the Rim Village behind the main cafeteria and gift shop.

The building is a one-story, wood-frame structure with native stones applied to the exterior to match the exterior of the nearby Rim Village cafeteria. Originally, an oil-burning water heater was used to heat shower water for park visitors. Today, the building remains an important part of the Rim Village landscape, despite minor alterations made to the structure when it was converted from a comfort station to an electrical transformer vault. Because it is now a utility building, it is no longer open to the public. Nevertheless, the structure retains its rustic appearance and contributes to the character of the Rim Village area. Because of its unique rustic character, the building was listed on the National Register of Historic Places in 1988 as Comfort Station No. 72 (NRHP #88002625).

== History ==
On 22 May 1902, President Theodore Roosevelt signed the bill making Crater Lake the Nation's sixth national park. The United States Department of the Interior was charged with developing visitor services in the park. The National Park Service approved a master plan for development of Rim Village in 1927. Implementation of the plan was overseen by the National Park Service's Landscape Engineering Division.

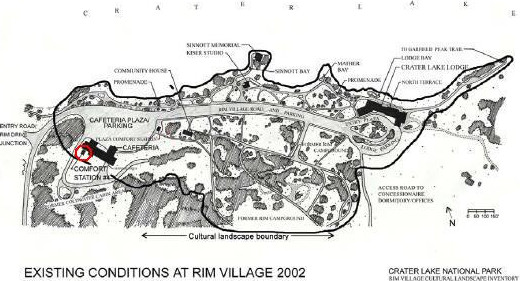
Comfort Station #4 (building 72) in Rim Village Historic District

Over the next fourteen years, the infrastructure of Crater Lake National Park was developed in accordance with the park's master plan. As a result, park buildings from this era reflect a common character consistent with National Park Service's rustic design style. Comfort Station #4 was an element of the master plan. It was constructed in 1930 by National Park Service staff under the direction of Merel S. Sager, the park's landscape architect and a pioneer of the rustic style of park architecture.

Today, the six main buildings in Rim Village and a number of minor structures like Comfort Station #4 still reflect the rustic design features of the original National Park Service master plan. As a result, Rim Village was listed as a historic district on the National Register of Historic Places in 1997 (NRHP #97001155).

== Access ==
Rim Village is located high in the Cascade Mountains, 7,100 feet (2,164 m) above sea level. In the Rim Village area, winter lasts eight months. While access to the Rim Village is normally year-round, most of the facilities are only open during the summer months due to the heavy winter snowfall that averages 533 inches (1,354 cm) per year.
