= National Park Service rustic =

20th century American architectural style

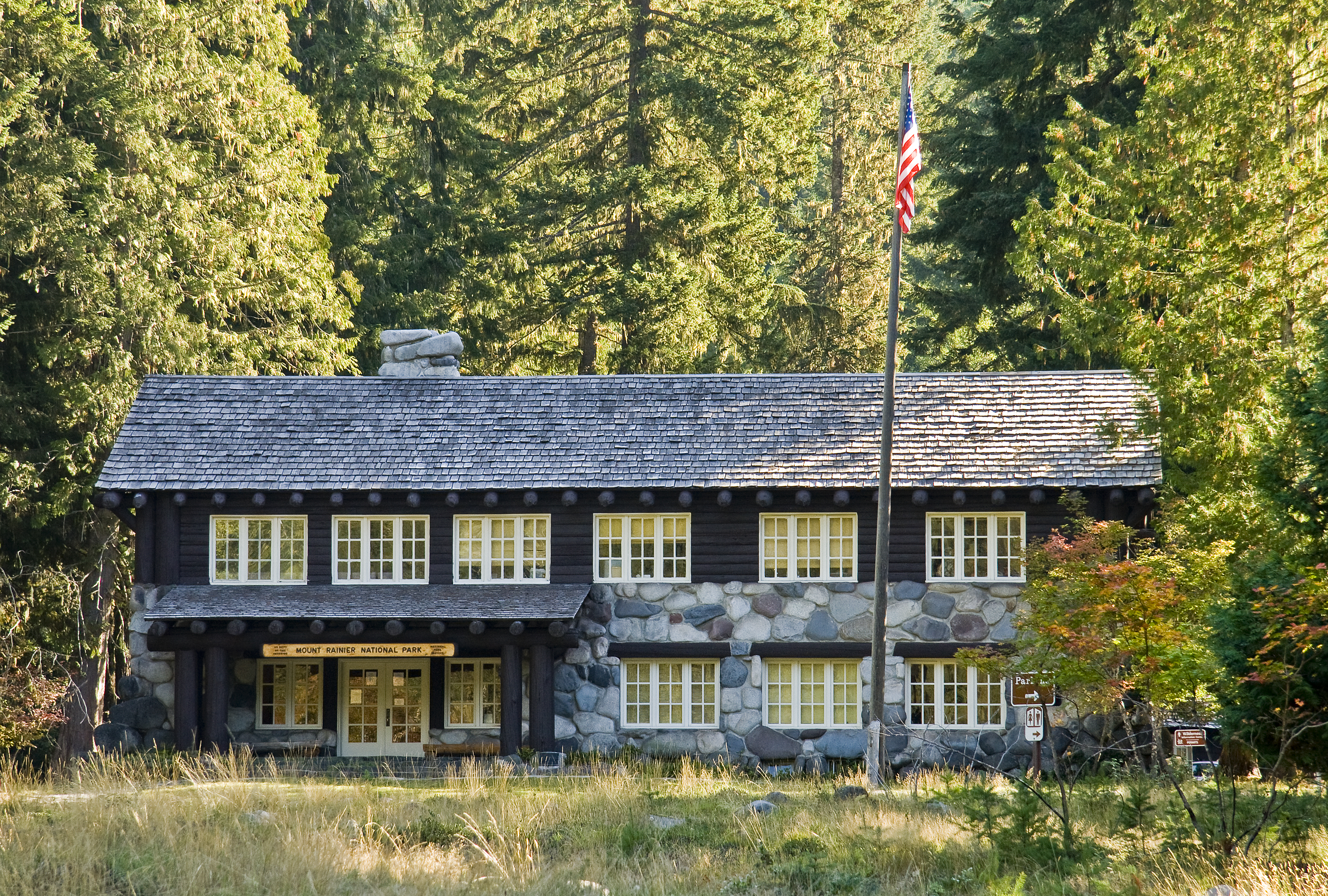
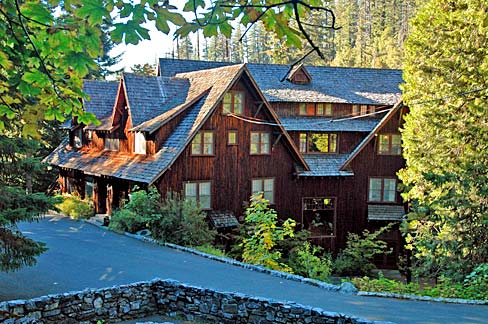
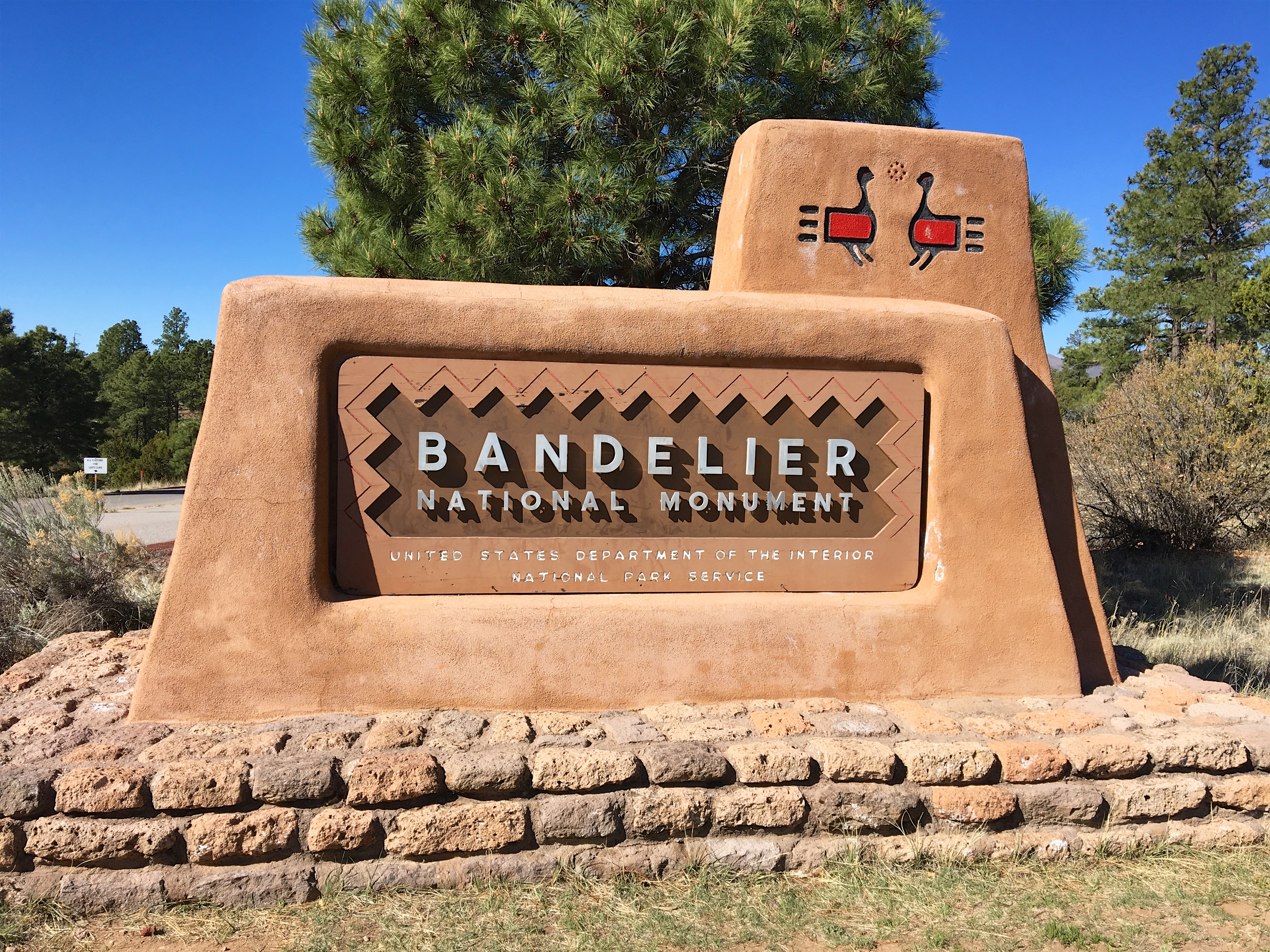
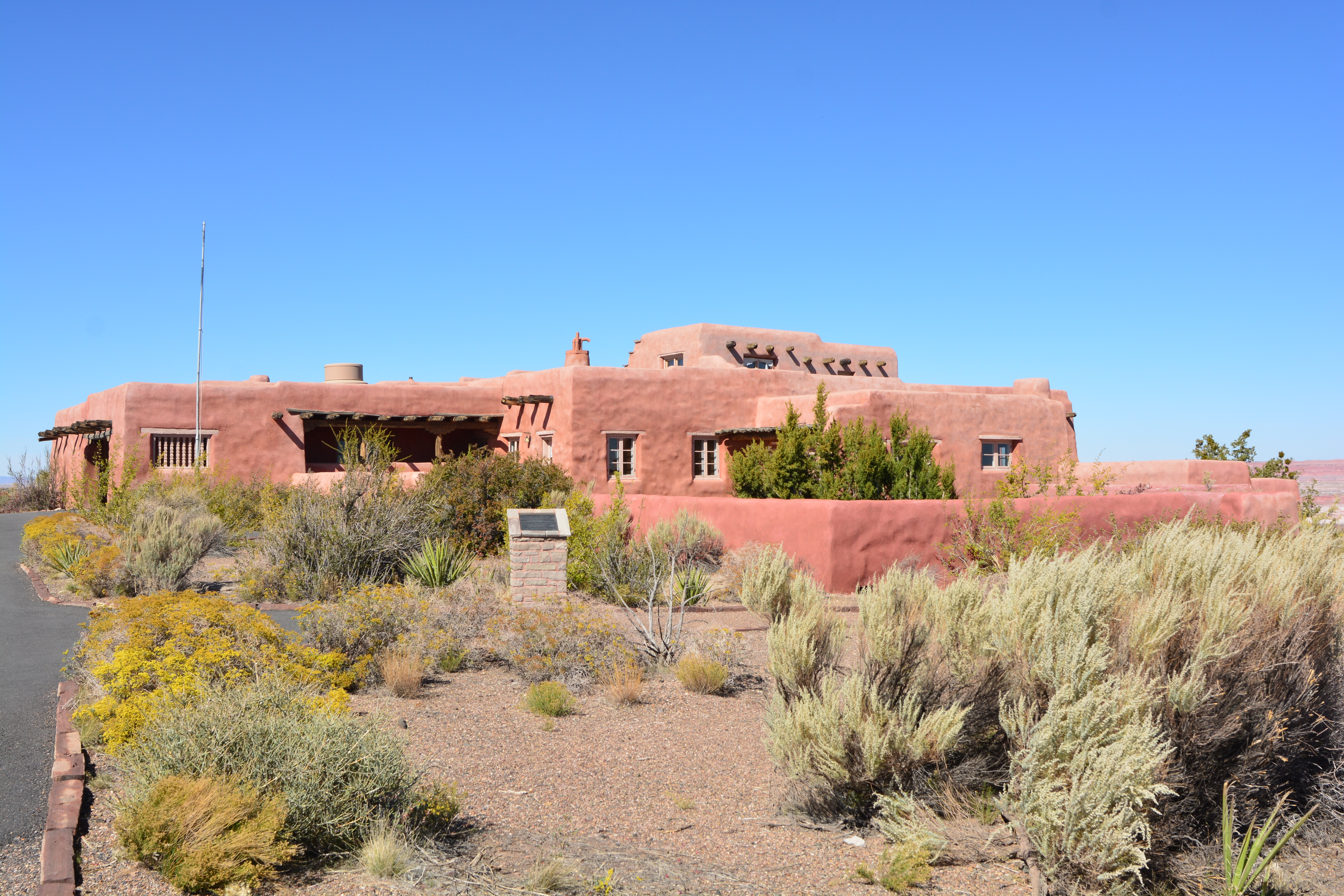
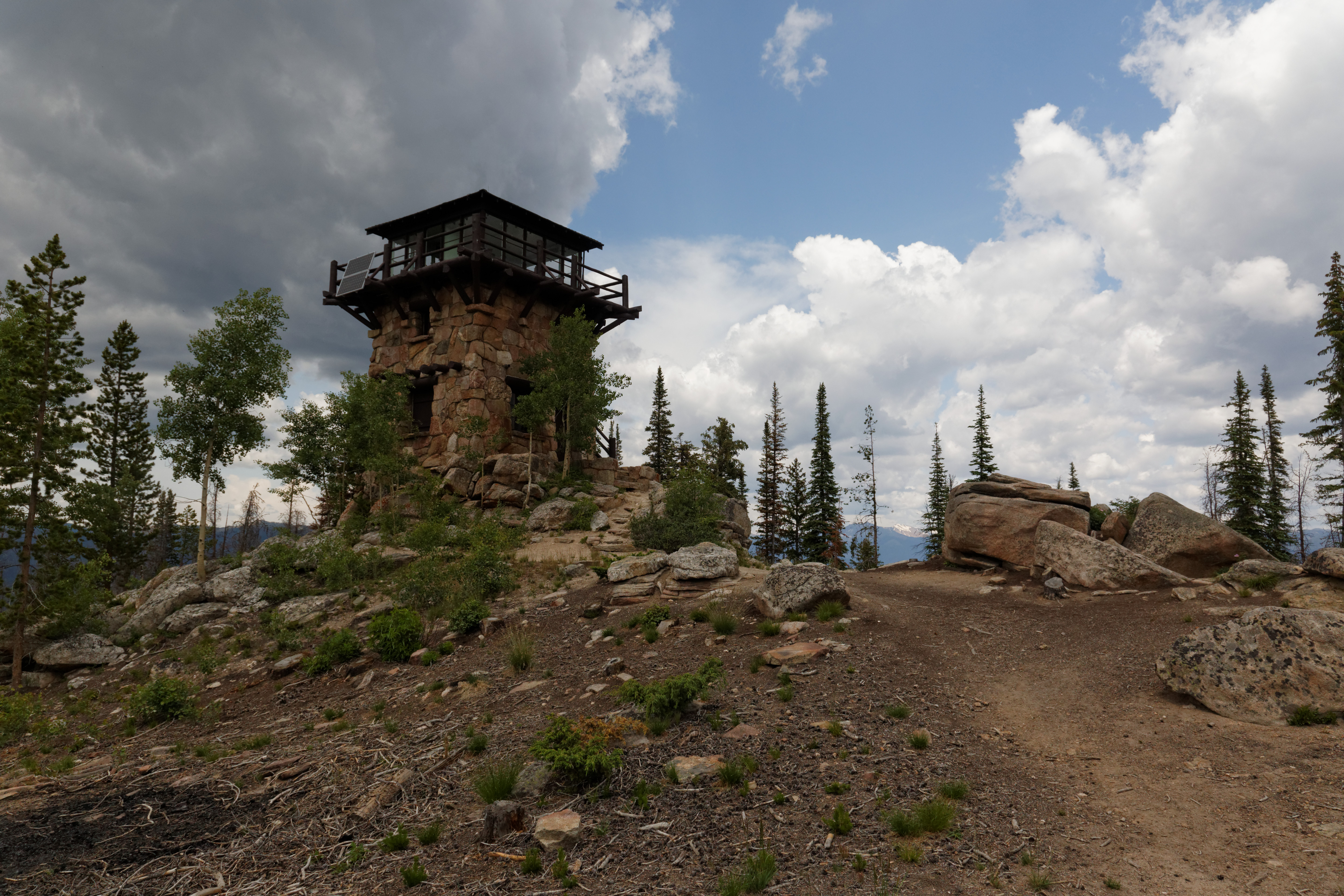
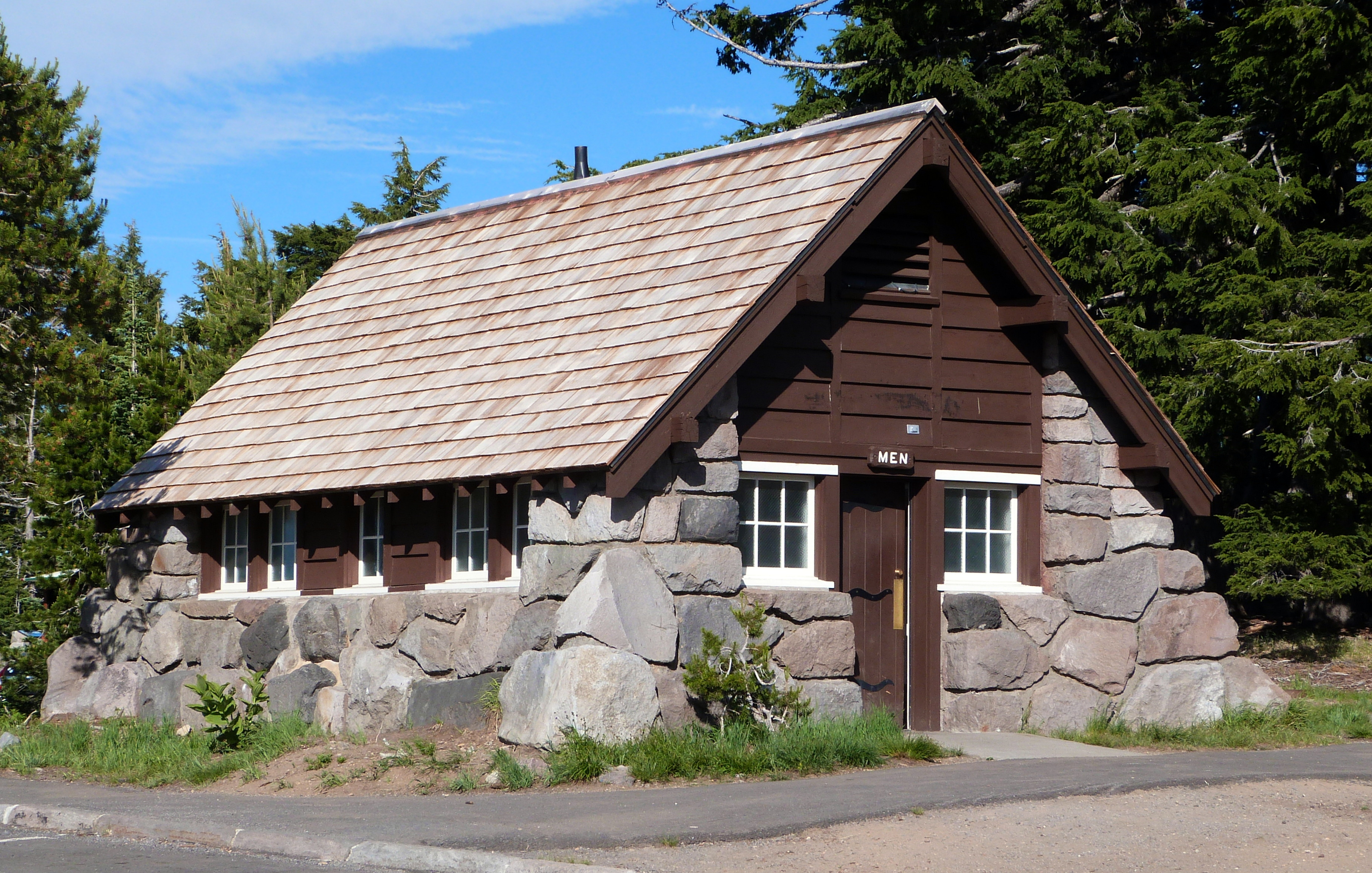
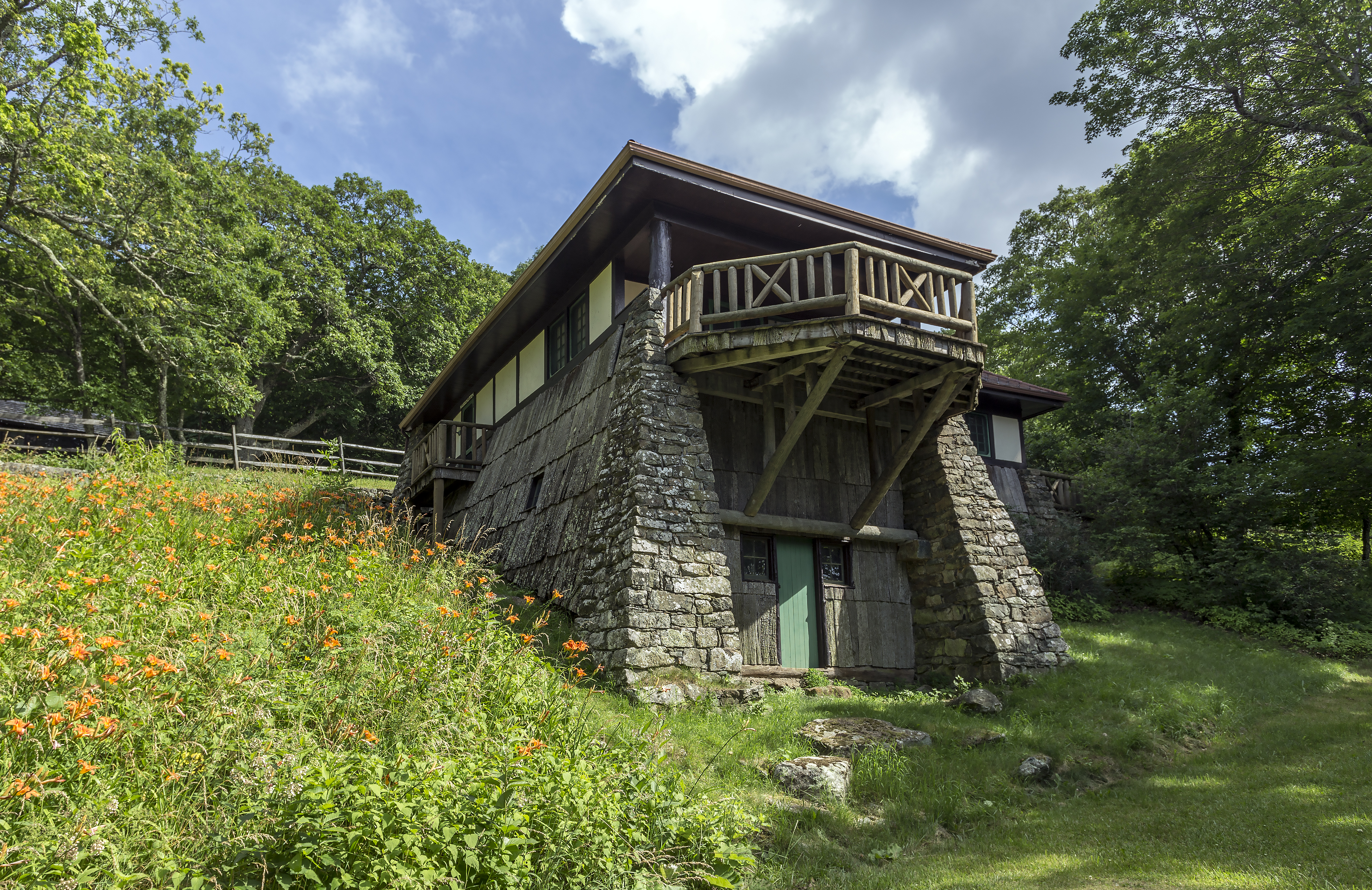
- Longmire Administration Building Oregon Caves Chateau Bandelier National Monument entrance Painted Desert Inn Desert View Watchtower Shadow Mountain Lookout Comfort Station No. 68 Massanutten Lodge
- Years active: 1900s – present
- Location: United States
- Major figures: National Park Service, Civilian Conservation Corps, Thomas Chalmers Vint, Herbert Maier
- Influences: Arts and Crafts movement, Adirondack Architecture

National Park Service rustic – sometimes colloquially called Parkitecture – is a style of architecture that developed in the early and middle 20th century in the United States National Park Service (NPS) through its efforts to create buildings that harmonized with the natural environment. Since its founding in 1916, the NPS sought to design and build visitor facilities without visually interrupting the natural or historic surroundings. The early results were characterized by intensive use of hand labor and a rejection of the regularity and symmetry of the industrial world, reflecting connections with the Arts and Crafts movement and American Picturesque architecture.

Architects, landscape architects and engineers combined native wood and stone with convincingly native styles to create visually appealing structures that seemed to fit naturally within the majestic landscapes. Examples of the style can be found in numerous types of National Park structures, including entrance gateways, hotels and lodges, park roads and bridges, visitor centers, trail shelters, informational kiosks, and even mundane maintenance and support facilities. Many of these buildings are listed on the National Register of Historic Places.

== Development 1872–1916 ==
The first national parks were a response to the romanticism that restructured the American concept of wilderness in the nineteenth century. As seen in the artistry of John James Audubon, James Fenimore Cooper, Thomas Cole, George Catlin, William Cullen Bryant and others, the idea of wilderness developed during the course of the nineteenth century from an entity to be feared and conquered into a resource that should be preserved and treasured. The early wilderness preservation philosophies – expressed through painting, poetry, essays, and later photography – helped lay the foundations for the acceptance of the first national parks. Beginning with Yosemite in 1864 and Yellowstone in 1872, public lands were set aside as parks. Early administration of these reserves was haphazard. Yosemite fell prey to a politicized board of state commissions, while Yellowstone was given an unpaid superintendent and no appropriations.

In 1883, because of extensive poaching and political scandal, the Army was authorized to protect Yellowstone although it was not called upon by the Secretary of the Interior to do so until 1886. The Army stayed in Yellowstone in an administrative capacity until 1916. After 1890, the Army also was called on to protect Sequoia, the General Grant tree, and Yosemite. In each of the Army parks, the War Department was compelled to erect basic facilities for its own use. Fort Yellowstone, Wyoming, was the most important of these complexes. The army buildings there were constructed to standard Army specifications. The Army had no direct interest in the landscape, and this was echoed in their architecture.

In those early parks where the Interior Department retained administrative responsibility (including Crater Lake, Mount Rainier and Glacier), government buildings usually were limited to primitive, vernacular expressions of facility need. Crude frame shacks, log cabins, or tent frames usually sufficed. These early government facilities could be simple because responsibility for housing and transporting the park visitor was delegated to the park concessioners.

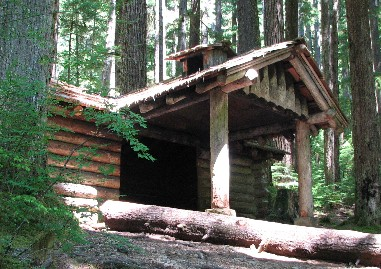
Trail shelter at Sol Duc Falls, Olympic National Park

The early park concessioners received little supervision. Their structures were typical makeshift frontier efforts. The railroads brought the first major developments to the parks. Not until after the completion of the northern transcontinental railroads in the 1890s, did more advanced concessioner facilities appear in Yellowstone, for example. Among the first of these was the Lake Hotel, constructed by the Northern Pacific Railroad in 1890. The formal classicism of this structure, with its ionic columns, three projecting porticos and symmetrical façade, made it clear that the building owed nothing to its setting. At the same time, as a part of this process, they also introduced their architectural and engineering expertise. The railroads' search for architectural styles suitable for park settings occurred at a time when landscape architecture was beginning to exert major influence on architectural design and theory. In 1842, landscape architect Andrew Jackson Downing had publicized his ideas on "picturesque" landscape and the importance of nature in architectural design in his widely distributed book Cottage Residences. Several decades later, Frederick Law Olmsted Sr., a friend and pupil of Downing, working in conjunction with architects such as Henry Hobson Richardson, strengthened the connections between architecture and landscape architecture. Building forms responded to their sites, landscaping becoming an integral part of the design. While buildings generally were constructed of natural materials such as native stone, timbers, and shingles, few were intentionally "rustic." Early "rustic" examples were usually "follies" – gazebos and small pavilions. Larger buildings intentionally rustic in style appeared in the Adirondack Mountains in the 1870s, creating the style known as Adirondack Architecture. This influence began to appear in park architecture after 1900.

== Policy ==
As the Park Service became more organized in the 1920s, it established a policy of rustic design. Promulgated primarily by landscape architect Thomas Chalmers Vint, with support from architect Herbert Maier, rustic design became entrenched as standard practice in the Park Service. During the 1930s, the Park Service administered Civilian Conservation Corps projects in state parks, and used the opportunity to promote rustic design on a widespread scale. However, in the post-World War II period, it became apparent that facilities could not be built in sufficient quantity to contend with a huge increase in automobile-borne park visitation. In the Mission 66 program, Vint and Maier consciously abandoned the rustic style in favor of a leaner and more expeditious modern style.

== Yosemite ==
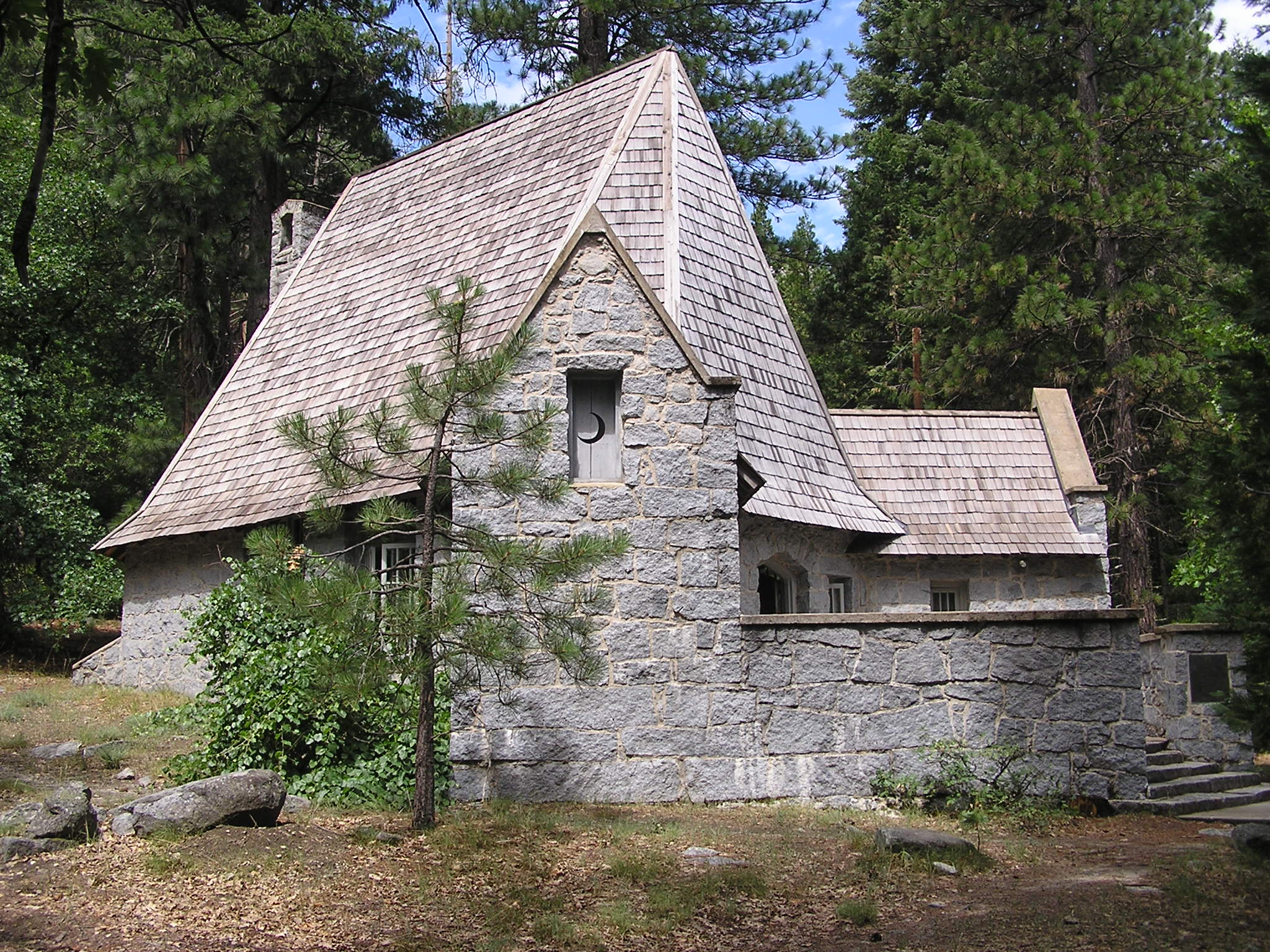
Exterior of the LeConte Memorial Lodge

In 1903, the Sierra Club erected LeConte Memorial Lodge in Yosemite Valley. Designed to serve as the Club's summer headquarters, it contained a library and a club information center. Weathered native granite dominated the symmetrical Tudor Revival building, which bore the strong imprint of its architect, John White, in an exaggerated roofline which comprised more than half of the height of the structure, a huge granite fireplace, and its rough-finish exposed roof beams.

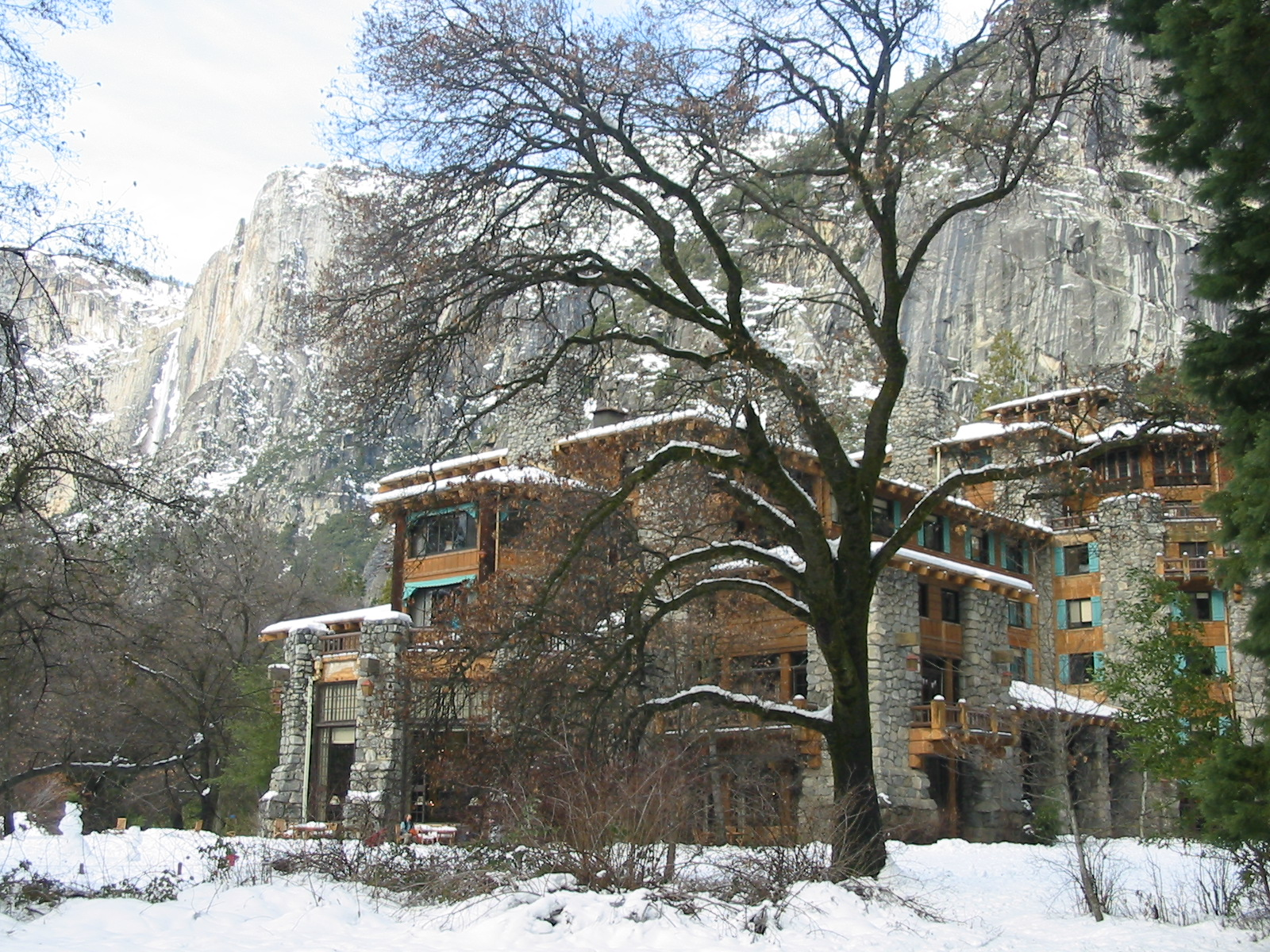
The Ahwahnee Hotel in December

The Yosemite Valley Railroad had constructed a depot in 1910 at El Portal near the park boundary, and a stage depot in Yosemite Valley. Although the railroad's operations were on a much smaller scale than those at the Grand Canyon or Yellowstone, its buildings were significant expressions of local park architecture. Both structures were built in a rustic stick style reminiscent of nineteenth century Adirondack camp architecture. The wood-frame buildings were covered with panels of decorative boughs. The diagonal brackets of the depot were small logs, complete with protruding knots. The Yosemite Valley Stage Depot, which also served as a telegraph office, had a steeply gabled roof, which comprised more than half the height of the building, and diamond-shaped window panes. Both structures were representative of a local movement of "rustic" architecture that developed in Yosemite after 1900. Several buildings at nearby Camp Curry shared the style.

Glacier Point received a new hotel in 1917. Erected by the Desmond Park Company, the 2- and 3-story, shingle-covered structure had a distinctly Swiss Chalet design emphasis. The steeply pitched roofs, numerous roof gables and intricate balconies added detail to this alpine structure. Although situated so that it had views of the Yosemite high country, the hotel was sufficiently removed from Glacier Point proper to reduce its visual impact.

Parsons Memorial Lodge was constructed by the Sierra Club in 1915 at Tuolumne Meadows. Parsons Lodge was a wide building of low profile, whose walls appeared to be granite dry stone masonry. Actually, the architect had experimented with a new construction technique so that the battered stone walls had concrete cores. This philosophy of using new building methods in visual imitation of pioneer building techniques matured in the 1920s in structures like Yosemite's Ahwahnee Hotel. A contemporary architect stated: "The building seems to grow out of the ground naturally and to belong there just as much as the neighboring trees and rocks."

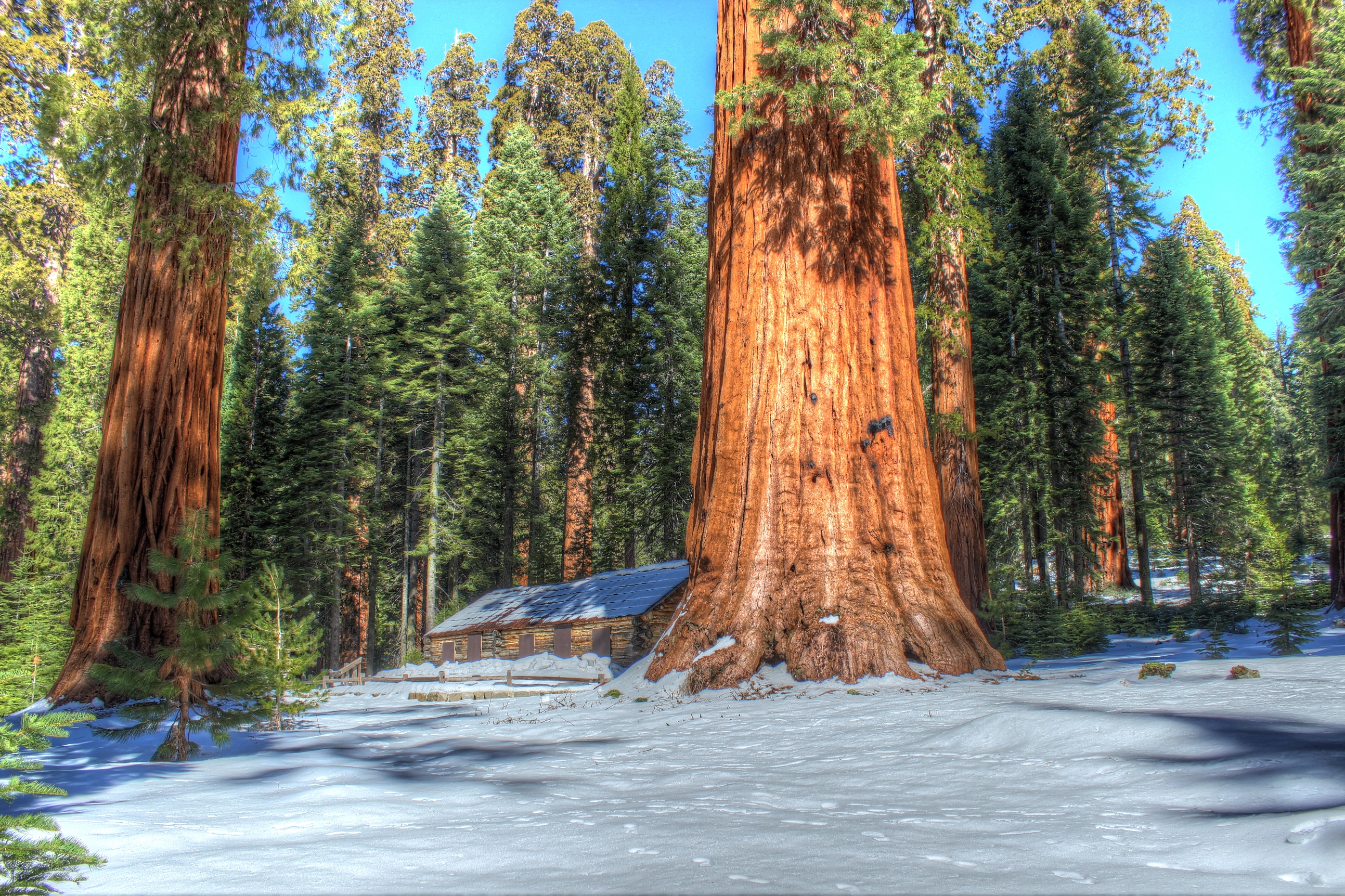
The Mariposa Grove Museum in winter.

The Mariposa Grove Museum, located in the upper grove, is a historic log cabin that opened in 1931, replacing an earlier structure built by Galen Clark, the grove's discoverer. Clark’s original cabin, built in 1858, served as a shelter for early visitors and was known for its picturesque setting among the giant sequoias. Though designed to minimize the visual impact of human structures in nature, it has become an iconic image of Yosemite. The museum was added to the National Register of Historic Places in 1978.

== Yellowstone ==
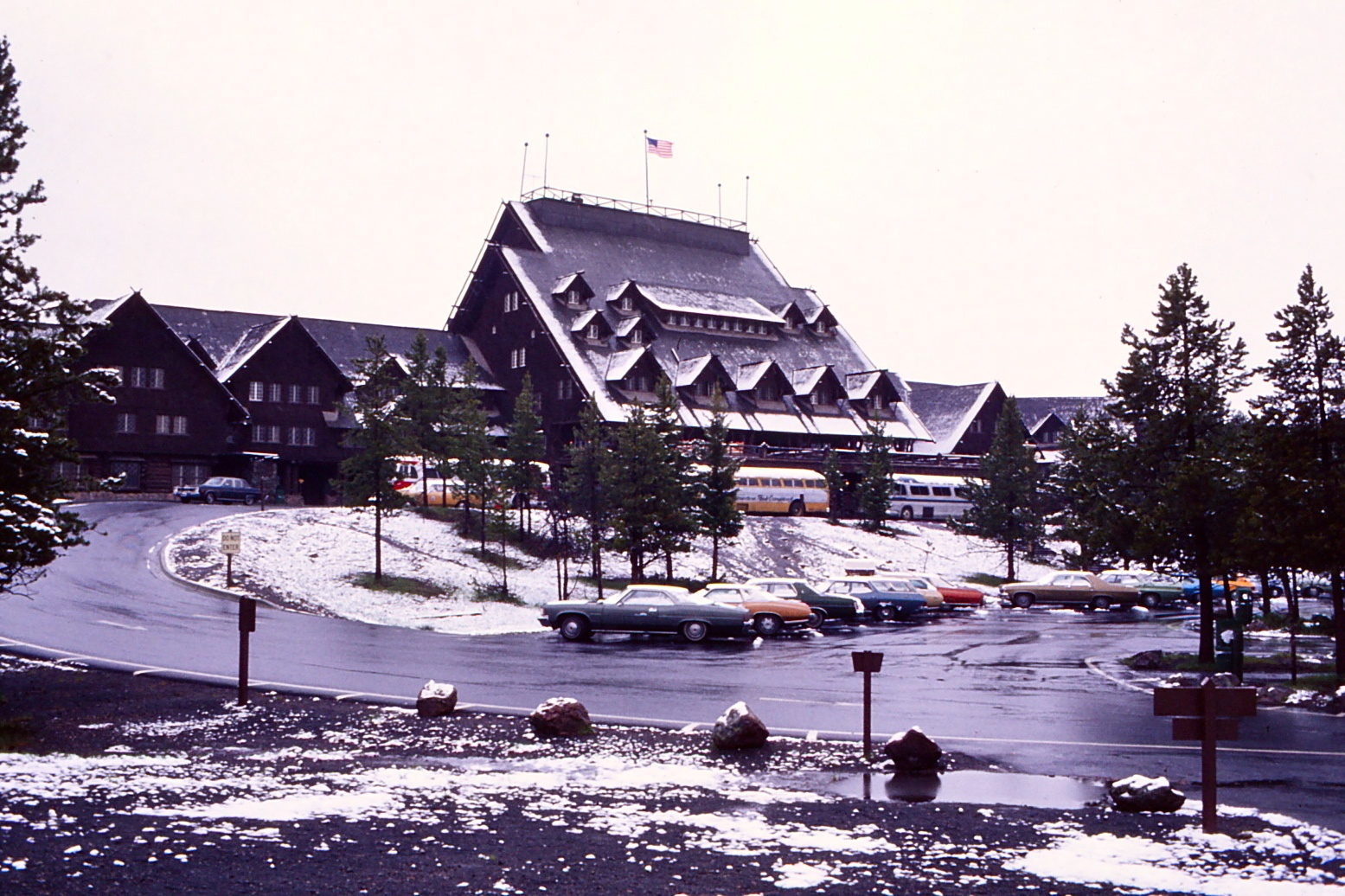
Old Faithful Inn, 1975

At Yellowstone National Park in 1903, the Northern Pacific Railroad constructed the Old Faithful Inn. This six-story resort was in the Swiss Chalet-Norway Villa tradition, but executed in a very western frontier manner. The exterior of the log frame structure was sheathed with shingles, and the building was heavily articulated with logwork piers and corners. Two stories of projecting dormers protruded from the enormous main gable, which was the dominant architectural feature. The combination of the logwork, shingles, and form resulted in a masterful structure. The Inn was designed by Robert Reamer, who is said to have "sketched the plans while coming shakily out of a monumental submersion in malt, and some authorities claim to be able to read that fact in its unique contours."

A series of four "trailside museums" were designed for Yellowstone by Herbert Maier in the late 1920s at Madison, Norris Geyser Basin, Fishing Bridge and Old Faithful. Maier designed many park structures in the western national parks during his tenure as an active Park Service architect, and went on to become an influential administrator in the Park Service regional office.

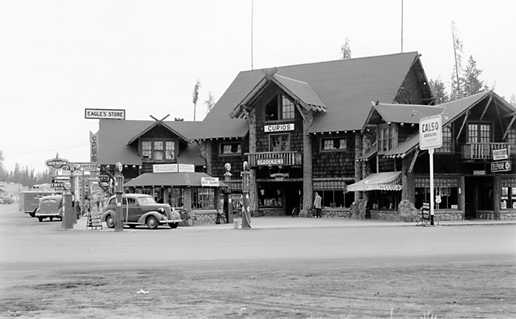
Eagle's Store, 1939.

In 1927 Bozeman architect Fred F. Willson designed a new, three-story structure for Eagle's Store on the site of the original store built in West Yellowstone in 1908. Willson donated his expertise in order to promote the National Park Service rustic style. The design was similar to that of Old Faithful Inn. Willson set fir logs measuring 18 feet (5.5 m) to 36 feet (11 m) long into a base of rhyolite and concrete. Buttresses were made of basalt.

== Mount Rainier ==
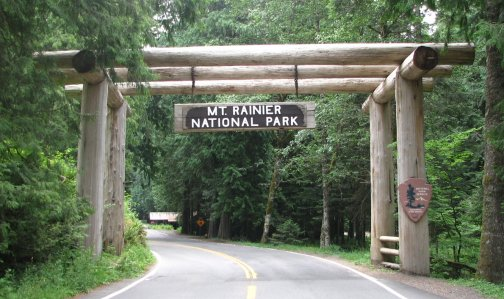
Mount Rainier's Nisqually Gate

Mount Rainier National Park is the fifth-oldest National Park and was the first to be designed using a master plan. Due in part to the late settling of the area as well as the National Park Service master plan, the National Park is home to superb examples of the National Park rustic style. Buildings in four historical districts—Nisqually, Longmire, Paradise, and Sunrise—along with patrol cabins and bridges make the park a showcase of the rustic style.

At the Nisqually entrance, massive entrance gates mark the entry to the park. These were the result of a request from Secretary of the Interior Bollinger, who asked for them as part of a 1910 visit to the park. The pergola was finished in time for President William Howard Taft's visit Mt. Rainier in fall of 1911. Further inward, the Longmire historical district is home to several pre-Park and early rustic–style buildings. The National Park Inn at Longmire was designed as an unpretentious building in a beautiful location at the start of the Wonderland Trail. The library, museum and visitor center, and the community building are all prime examples of rustic architecture dating from the early twentieth century. The administrative building, as a mature NPS building, was built in 1928 and is the example of successful pairing of the prairie style and rustic style.

The best-known area of the National Park is the Paradise Historical District. Developed by the Rainier National Park Company in 1916–1917, the Paradise Inn is the crown jewel hotel of the National Park. Following the example of Old Faithful Inn the 2 1/2-story inn was designed to withstand the severe Cascade Winters. The hotel was made of the remains of a heavy forest fire that burnt several miles of Cedar Trees. Years of exposure weathered these trees to a fine silver, which were used for architectural and decorative elements of the lodge. Other buildings at Paradise include a ranger station, a comfort station, a guide house, and a modern example of the rustic style, the new Henry M. Jackson Visitor Center.

== Grand Canyon ==
In Arizona, the Atchison, Topeka and Santa Fe Railway in 1901 completed a branch from its Chicago–Los Angeles main line to the south rim of the Grand Canyon, several years before Grand Canyon National Monument was proclaimed. In partnership with the Fred Harvey Company, the railroad built a luxury hotel, El Tovar, at the south rim in 1904. The Santa Fe retained Charles Frederick Whittlesey of Topeka, Kansas, to design the building, which boasted more than one hundred bedrooms. It opened in January, 1905. Built with turn-of-the-century eclecticism, El Tovar incorporated, according to Fred Harvey literature, exterior elements of the Swiss Chalet and Norway Villa, with an exotic combination of interior motifs, including a fifteenth-century dining room, and a series of "art rooms " which contained Thomas Moran paintings, Navajo rugs, and other Native American artifacts. The hotel was "stained to a rich brown or weather-beaten color, that harmonized perfectly with the grey-green of its unique surroundings. It is pleasant to the eye."

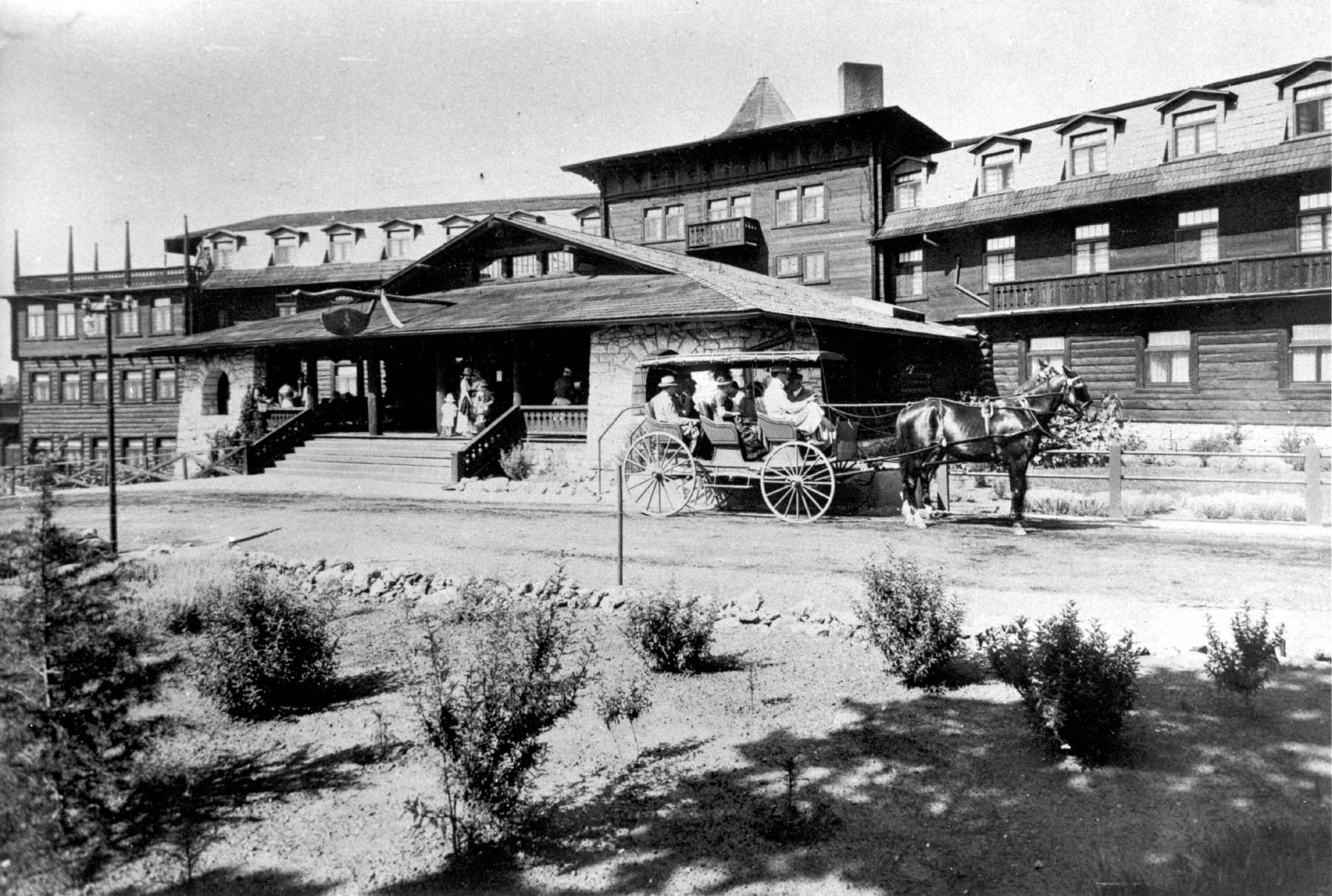
An early view of the El Tovar Hotel

Hopi House, directly adjacent to El Tovar, was constructed by Fred Harvey and the Santa Fe in 1905. The building was designed to serve as a gift shop where Native Americans could sell their wares. In that way, it provided an outlet for the Hopi who lived within part of it as well as for the Navajo who built traditional hogans nearby. Hopi House closely copied the Hopi pueblo at Oraibi, Arizona, and was designed by Mary Colter, architect for the Fred Harvey Company. The building was constructed in the traditional pueblo style, an idiom well suited to the setting. The Hopi House work had a lasting effect on park architecture, and on contemporary southwestern architecture, although later pueblo adaptations were generally less concerned with authenticity. The stylistic choice on the part of Miss Colter and the Fred Harvey Company was primarily commercial, designed to stimulate interest in Native American goods. Judged by such standards Hopi House was successful; it served as a handsome marketing facility. Hopi House symbolized the partnership between commercialism and romanticism that typified so much of Fred Harvey architecture.

About 1914 the Fred Harvey Company initiated a major expansion of its Grand Canyon facilities. One of the first new structures was the Lookout Studio, designed by Mary Colter. Built of native stone, the canyon-rim structure had an uneven parapet roofline that matched the form and color of the surrounding cliffs.

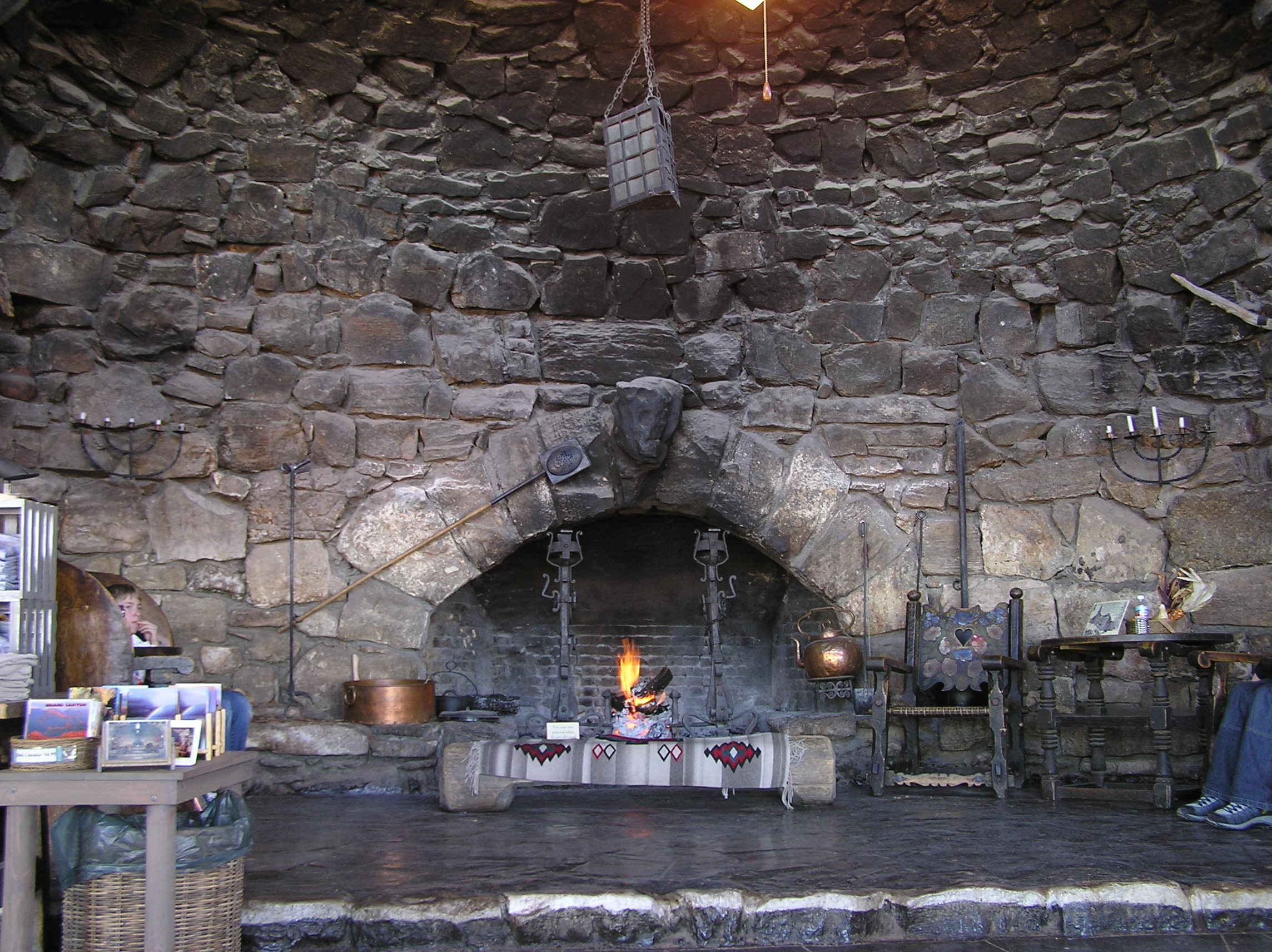
Fireplace inside Hermit's Rest

Hermit's Rest, another one of Colter's fantasy buildings, was constructed at the head of the Hermit Trail in 1914 to serve as a refreshment stand and gift shop. Constructed of native stones and massive logs, the building seemed to have grown in its setting, and was carefully screened by vegetation. Its most impressive feature was its enormous fireplace.

Concessions at the Grand Canyon's relatively remote North Rim were built and operated by the Utah Parks Company, a subsidiary of the Union Pacific Railroad. Concession operations there are centered at Grand Canyon Lodge, constructed at the canyon's rim in 1927–1928. Designed by noted architect Gilbert Stanley Underwood, the massive, rustic-style lodge was built of timber, logs, and native limestone. A total of 120 rustic guest cabins spread outward from the main building. The original lodge structure burned in 1932, but was rebuilt in 1936–1937 on its original footprint. The rustic design ethic of the original lodge was retained in the 1937 building, and today the Grand Canyon Lodge complex is considered to be the best-preserved of the era's rustic National Park hotels.

== Glacier National Park ==
Glacier National Park was established in 1910, immediately north of the main line of the Great Northern Railway. The railroad immediately began a massive concession development program in and near the park, which included the construction of two major hotels and nine smaller "chalet" complexes. The cornerstone of the project was Glacier Park Hotel (now Glacier Park Lodge), located just outside the park boundary at Glacier Park Station (East Glacier). The hotel had a capacity of 400 guests. The enormous log frame complex was four stories high, and 628 feet (191 m) long. Complete with music and writing rooms, sun parlor and emergency hospital, the hotel boasted unpeeled log pillars up to four feet in diameter. Used on both exterior and interior, the logs brought nature inside for the pleasure and comfort of the guests. As described in contemporary promotional literature, the "Forest" lobby included an "open camp fire on the Lobby's floor; here tourists and dignified Blackfeet chiefs and weatherbeaten guides cluster of evenings about a great bed of stones on which sticks of fragrant pine crackle merrily." The structure included on its 160-acre (0.6 km^{2}) tract a Blackfeet Indian camp.

The railroad's other major Glacier development was Many Glacier Hotel, a huge and rambling Swiss Chalet–style property on the shore of Swiftcurrent Lake in the northeastern portion of the park. Glacier's third rustic-style hotel, now known as Lake McDonald Lodge, was constructed privately in 1913 and added to the Great Northern concession in 1930.

The chalet camps scattered throughout the park were log or stone structures, built "on the Swiss style of architecture. " Most were log cabin complexes while others, notably Sperry Chalet and Granite Park Chalet, were stone buildings. Each of the isolated facilities had a huge stone fireplace. Spaced within easy travelling distance of each other, the chalets were located in the most scenic portions of the park.

== Crater Lake ==
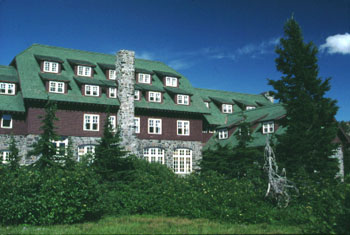
Crater Lake Lodge in Crater Lake National Park, Oregon

Construction on the Crater Lake Lodge in Oregon began in 1914, although numerous additions were built later. The hotel was constructed directly on the crater rim approximately 1,000 feet (300 m) above the lake. The original plan was fairly symmetrical. The lower story which was constructed of stone, included handsome arched windows. The upper stories were shingled. The roof, interrupted by rows of dormer windows, had clipped gables at the ends. Although the hotel incorporated local materials into its design in an attempt to integrate with the site, the complex remained relatively prominent, a result of its siting.

See also

- Munson Valley Historic District
- Rim Village Historic District
- Rim Drive Historic District
- Crater Lake Superintendent's Residence
- Sinnott Memorial Building No. 67
- Comfort Station No. 68
- Comfort Station No. 72

== Other national parks ==
Other National Parks with structures in this style include:

- Bryce Canyon Lodge in Bryce Canyon National Park.
- Civilian Conservation Corps buildings in the Bandelier CCC Historic District, Bandelier National Monument, Los Alamos, New Mexico.
- Oregon Caves Chateau located in the Oregon Caves Historic District at Oregon Caves National Monument.
- Painted Desert Inn in Petrified Forest National Park.
- Shadow Mountain Lookout in Rocky Mountain National Park.
- Zion Lodge in Zion National Park.

== U.S. National Forests ==
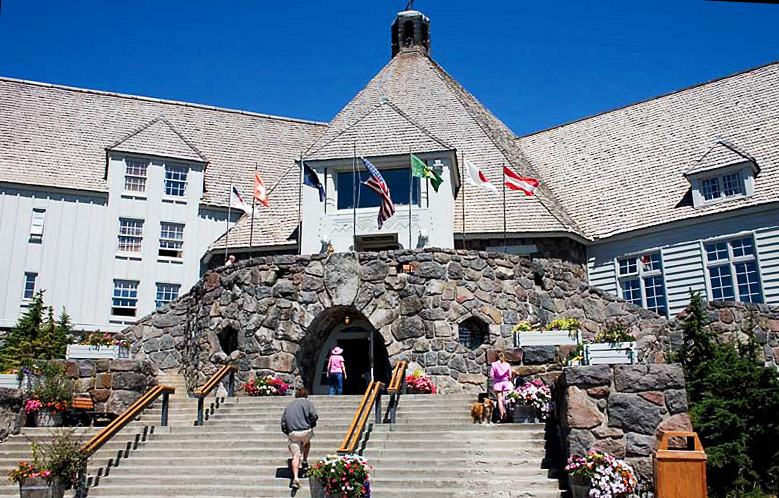
Timberline Lodge in Mount Hood National Forest

The term has even been applied to some structures in a similar style located in National Forests:

- Timberline Lodge in Mount Hood National Forest

== U.S. state parks ==
The style was adopted by a number of state parks in the United States. The work was often performed by the Civilian Conservation Corps. Some examples are:

- Illinois' Starved Rock lodge
- Millersylvania State Park near Olympia, Washington
- Sylvan Lake lodge, and other buildings in Custer State Park, South Dakota
- Mount Magazine State Park lodge in Arkansas
- Mather Lodge at Petit Jean State Park in Arkansas
- Silver Falls Lodge at the Silver Falls State Park in Oregon
- CCC Shelter at Pokagon State Park in Indiana
- CCC campground at Upton State Forest, in Upton, Massachusetts
- Longhorn Cavern State Park in Burnet County, Texas
- Three CCC-built cabins on the canyon rim at Palo Duro Canyon State Park in Randall County, Texas
- Dolliver Memorial State Park near Fort Dodge, Iowa
- Jay Cooke State Park near Duluth, Minnesota
- Mount Tamalpais State Park near Mill Valley, California, specifically trails, a fire lookout at the peak of the mountain, and the famous Mountain Theater/Sidney B. Cushing Memorial Amphitheater

== Influence in Canada ==
In Canada rustic architecture influenced the designs of several national park buildings such as the Jasper Park Information Centre (1914), and the Riding Mountain Park East Gate Registration Complex (1933). As well this style influenced hotels like the Château Montebello (1930), and many private residences, especially vacation properties and second homes built on lakes and in forests ("cottages" in Southern Ontario, "cabins" in Western Canada, etc.)

== See also ==
- Canada's grand railway hotels
- Châteauesque
- Daniel Ray Hull
- Mary Jane Colter
- Herbert Maier
- Robert Reamer
- Gilbert Stanley Underwood
- Thomas C. Vint
- Rustic furniture
