= Fort Klamath, Oregon =

Unincorporated community in the state of Oregon, United States

Coordinates: 42°42′18″N 121°59′39″W

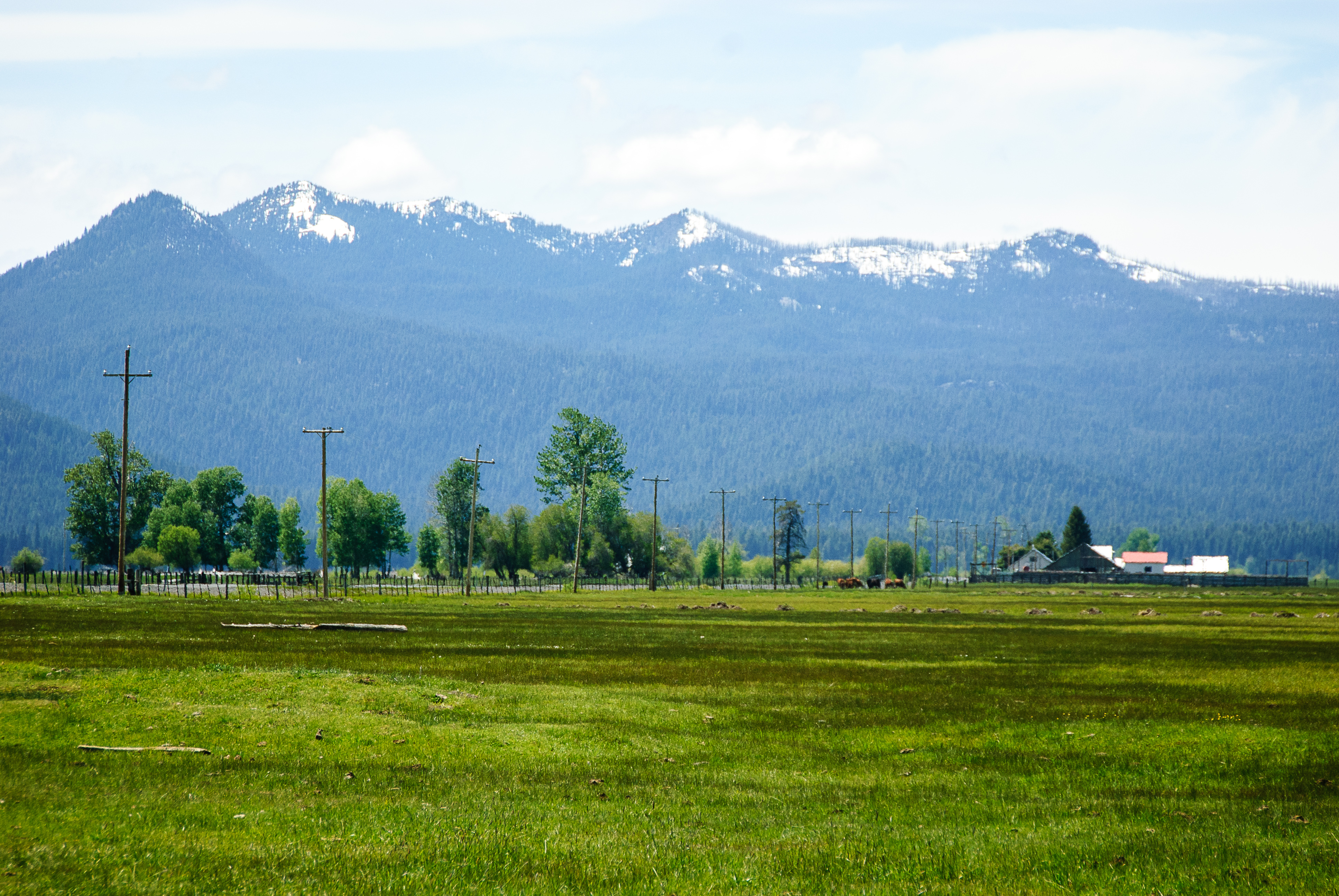
Fort Klamath area

Fort Klamath is a census-designated place located between Crater Lake National Park and Upper Klamath Lake in Klamath County, Oregon, United States. As of the 2020 census, Fort Klamath had a population of 43.

The community is located about a mile northwest of Fort Klamath, the Oregon Trail military outpost. Fort Klamath post office was established January 6, 1879.

== Climate ==
This region experiences warm (but not hot) and dry summers, with no average monthly temperatures above 71.6 °F. According to the Köppen Climate Classification system, Fort Klamath has a warm-summer Mediterranean climate, abbreviated "Csb" on climate maps.

Climate data for Fort Klamath, Oregon (1991–2020 normals, extremes 1980–present)
Month	Jan	Feb	Mar	Apr	May	Jun	Jul	Aug	Sep	Oct	Nov	Dec	Year
Record high °F (°C)	64 (18)	65 (18)	72 (22)	84 (29)	93 (34)	104 (40)	103 (39)	104 (40)	100 (38)	92 (33)	72 (22)	57 (14)	104 (40)
Mean daily maximum °F (°C)	39.2 (4.0)	44.1 (6.7)	50.4 (10.2)	56.9 (13.8)	66.4 (19.1)	75.0 (23.9)	84.9 (29.4)	84.3 (29.1)	77.5 (25.3)	63.9 (17.7)	47.9 (8.8)	38.9 (3.8)	60.8 (16.0)
Daily mean °F (°C)	28.9 (−1.7)	32.9 (0.5)	37.6 (3.1)	42.7 (5.9)	49.8 (9.9)	56.2 (13.4)	63.5 (17.5)	62.4 (16.9)	55.9 (13.3)	45.7 (7.6)	35.9 (2.2)	28.9 (−1.7)	45.0 (7.2)
Mean daily minimum °F (°C)	18.6 (−7.4)	21.6 (−5.8)	24.8 (−4.0)	28.4 (−2.0)	33.2 (0.7)	37.4 (3.0)	42.1 (5.6)	40.6 (4.8)	34.2 (1.2)	27.5 (−2.5)	23.8 (−4.6)	18.9 (−7.3)	29.3 (−1.5)
Record low °F (°C)	−25 (−32)	−19 (−28)	−12 (−24)	6 (−14)	13 (−11)	20 (−7)	24 (−4)	26 (−3)	17 (−8)	7 (−14)	−7 (−22)	−20 (−29)	−25 (−32)
Average precipitation inches (mm)	3.78 (96)	2.25 (57)	1.94 (49)	1.42 (36)	1.49 (38)	0.61 (15)	0.24 (6.1)	0.31 (7.9)	0.48 (12)	1.37 (35)	2.83 (72)	4.36 (111)	21.08 (535)
Average snowfall inches (cm)	13.5 (34)	10.0 (25)	7.6 (19)	2.5 (6.4)	0.3 (0.76)	0.0 (0.0)	0.0 (0.0)	0.0 (0.0)	0.0 (0.0)	0.1 (0.25)	7.9 (20)	19.1 (49)	61.0 (155)
Average precipitation days (≥ 0.01 in)	12.8	10.5	10.9	9.8	7.9	4.1	2.1	2.6	3.4	7.5	12.1	13.8	97.5
Average snowy days (≥ 0.1 in)	6.2	4.9	4.1	1.7	0.4	0.0	0.0	0.0	0.0	0.1	2.3	7.7	27.4
Source: NOAA

== Education ==
It is within the Klamath County School District.

It is in the territory of Klamath Community College.
