= Hillman Peak =

Mountain peak in Oregon

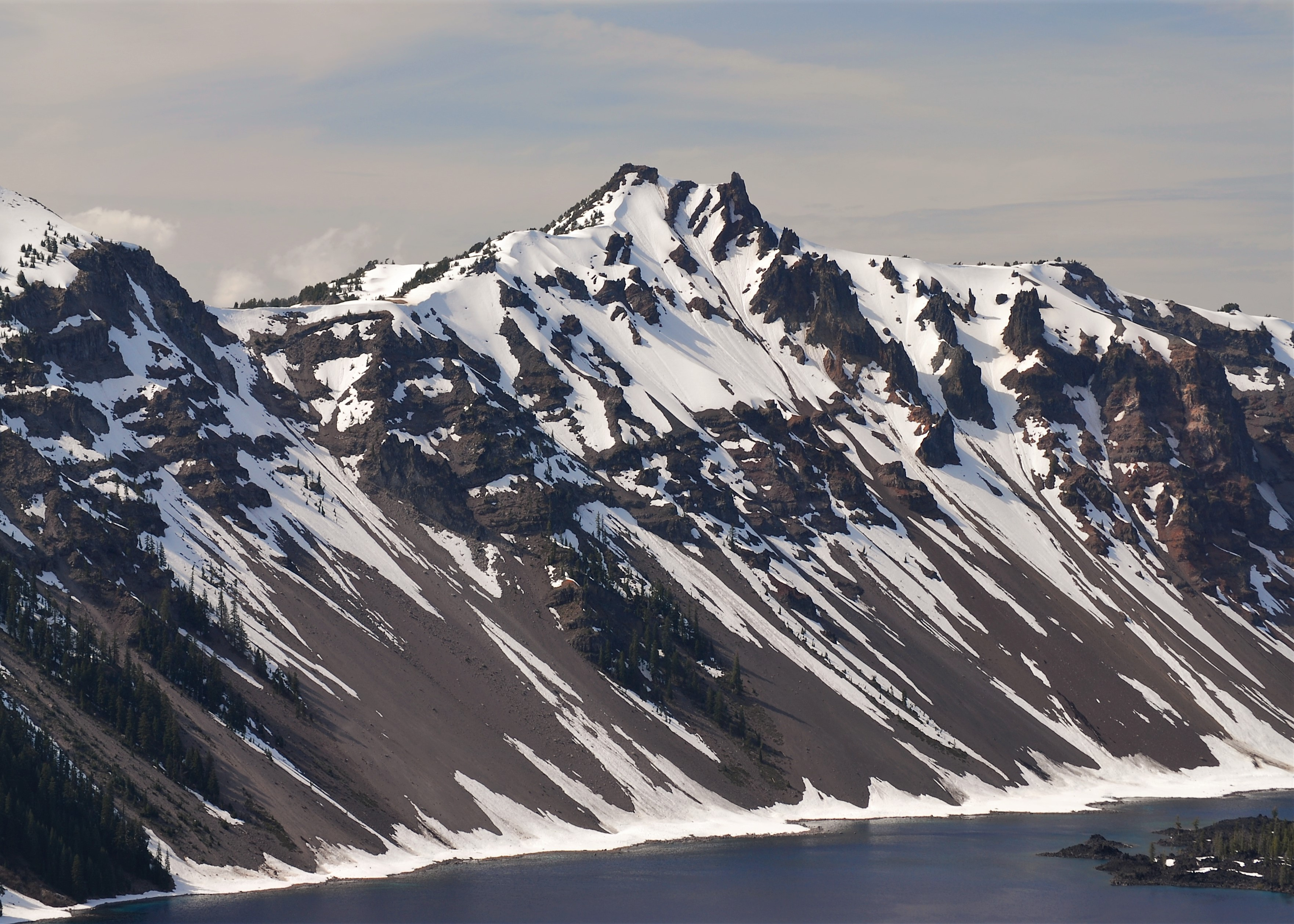
- Southeast aspect

Highest point
- Elevation: 8,151 ft (2,484 m)
- Prominence: 1,391 ft (424 m)
- Parent peak: Mount Scott (8,934 ft)
- Isolation: 8.01 mi (12.89 km)
- Coordinates: 42°57′07″N 122°10′09″W

Naming
- Etymology: John Wesley Hillman

Geography
- Location within Oregon Location within the United States
- Country: United States of America
- State: Oregon
- County: Klamath
- Protected area: Crater Lake National Park
- Parent range: Cascades
- Topo map: USGS Crater Lake West

Geology
- Rock age: Pleistocene
- Mountain type: Stratovolcano
- Rock type(s): andesite, breccia
- Volcanic arc: Cascade Volcanic Arc
- Last eruption: Pleistocene

Climbing
- Easiest route: class 3 scrambling

Hillman Peak is an 8,151 feet (2,484 m) summit on the west rim of Crater Lake in Crater Lake National Park, Oregon. It is the highest peak on the caldera rim and ranks as the second-highest peak in the park. It is situated 1.5 mile northwest of Wizard Island. Topographic relief is significant as the summit rises 1,973 feet above the lake in 0.57 mile. Rim Drive traverses the western slope of the peak. Precipitation runoff from the peak's east slope drains into Crater Lake whereas the west slope drains to the Rogue River via Copeland Creek.

== History ==
Hillman Peak was named by William Gladstone Steel for John Wesley Hillman (1832–1915), a prospector who discovered Crater Lake on June 12, 1853. The peak's "Hillman Peak" toponym was officially adopted in 1928 by the United States Board on Geographic Names. Variant names prior to 1928 included Glacier Peak and Maxwell Peak.

== Climate ==
Based on the Köppen climate classification, Hillman Peak has a subalpine climate. Most weather fronts originate in the Pacific Ocean, and travel east toward the Cascades where they are forced upward by the range (Orographic lift), causing them to drop their moisture in the form of rain or snowfall. As a result, the Cascades experience high precipitation, especially during the winter months in the form of snowfall. Winter temperatures can drop below 10 °F (−12 °C) with wind chill factors below 0 °F (−18 °C). In the Crater Lake area, winter lasts eight months with an average snowfall of 41 feet (12.5 m) per year. Rim Drive is only open during the summer due to the heavy snowfall as the road is covered by more than 20 feet (6.1 m) of snow with drifts as deep as 60 feet (18 m) in some areas. During winter months, weather is usually cloudy, but due to high pressure systems over the Pacific Ocean that intensify during summer months, there is often little or no cloud cover during the summer.

== Geology ==
Hillman Peak was created when Mount Mazama, a large stratovolcano erupted violently approximately 7,700 years ago and formed on the caldera rim. The peak is the remnant of a parasitic cone on the western flank of Mount Mazama, such that when the caldera formed, the eastern half of the Hillman cone disappeared. The peak is composed of lava flows containing pyroxene and hornblende andesites and breccias. Evidence suggests that the pre-eruption Hillman cone acted as a cleaver which was never entirely covered by glacial ice.

According to the Global Volcanism Program (GVP), Hillman Peak is classified as a subfeature stratovolcano of Mount Mazama.

== See also ==
- Applegate Peak
- Llao Rock

== Gallery ==
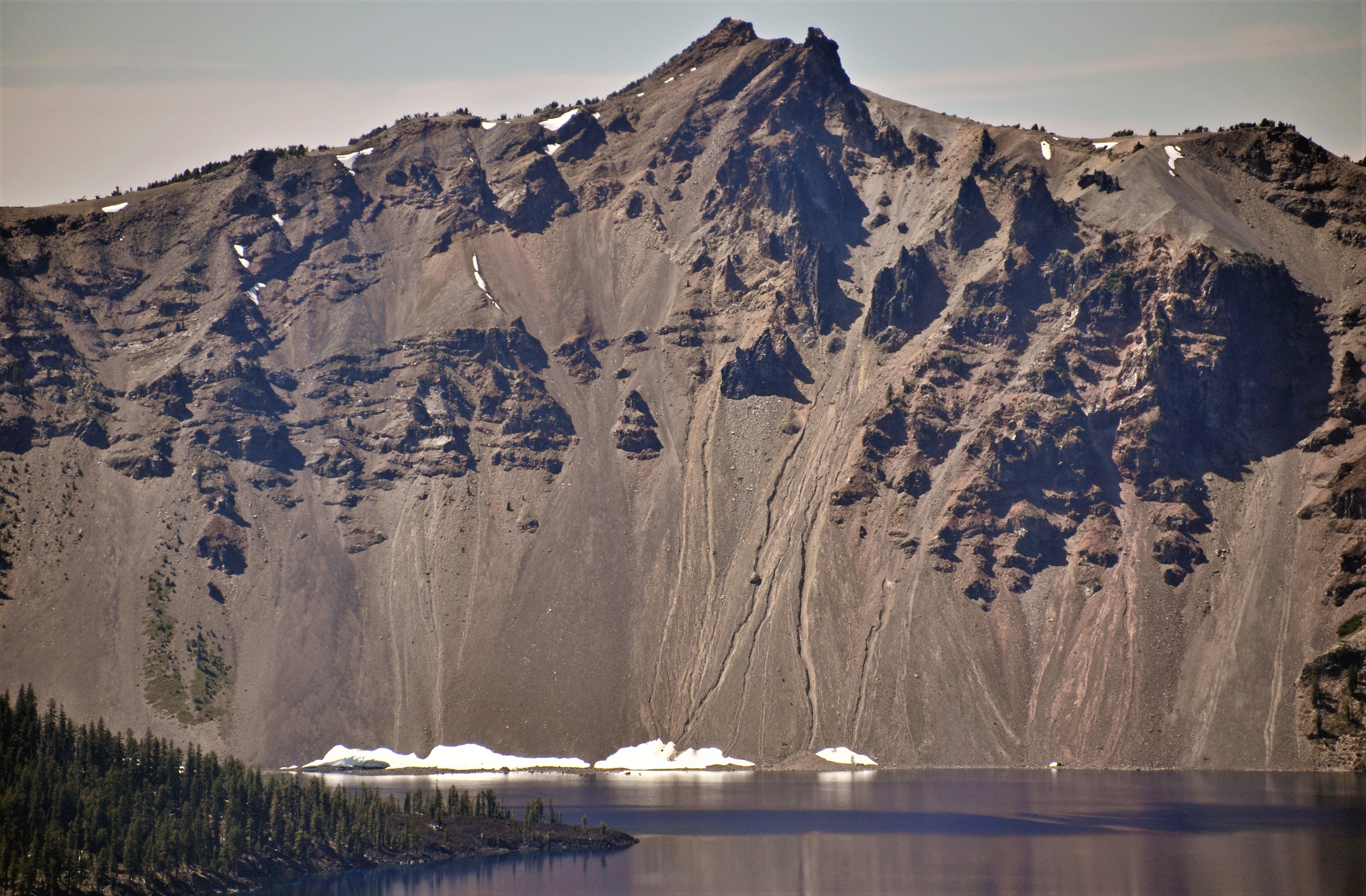

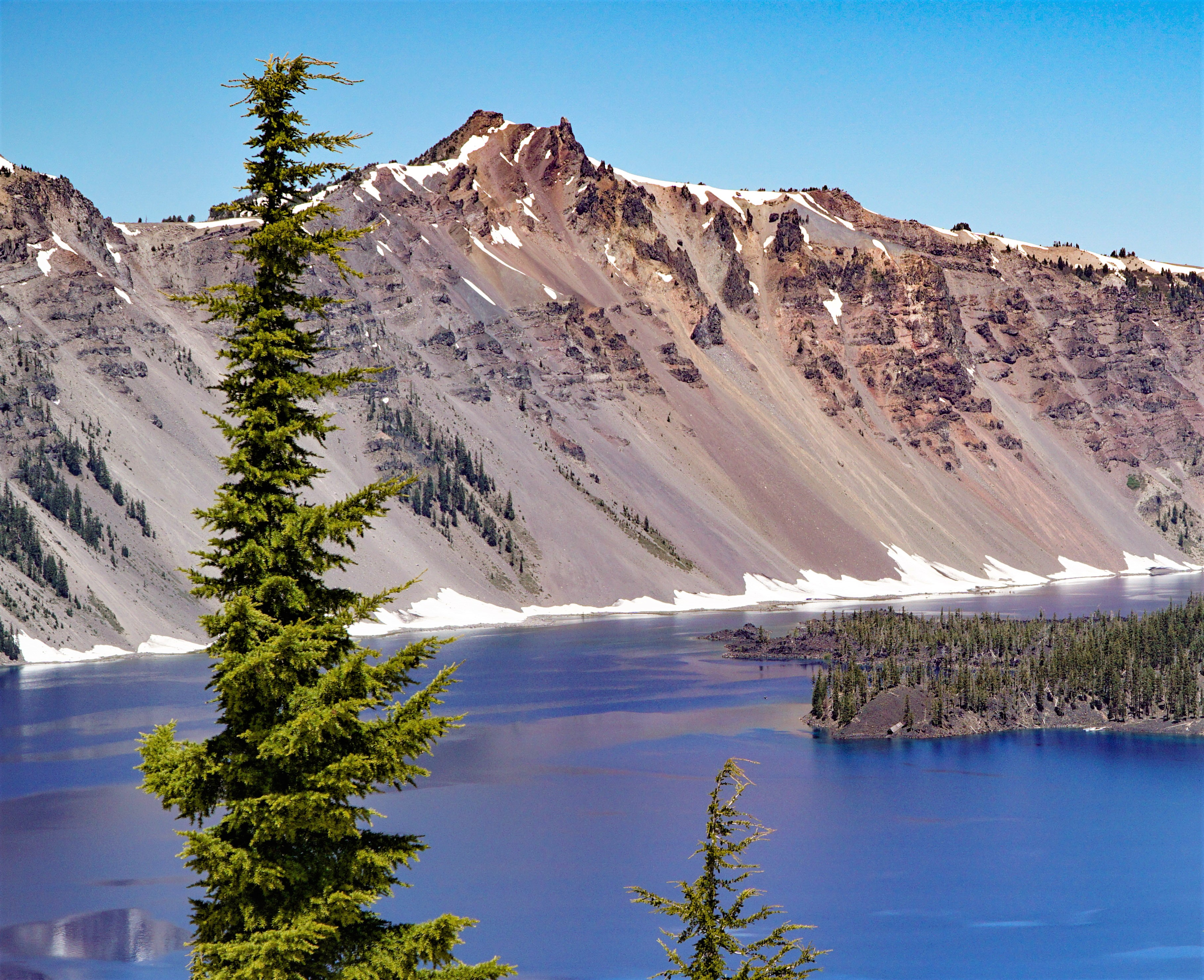

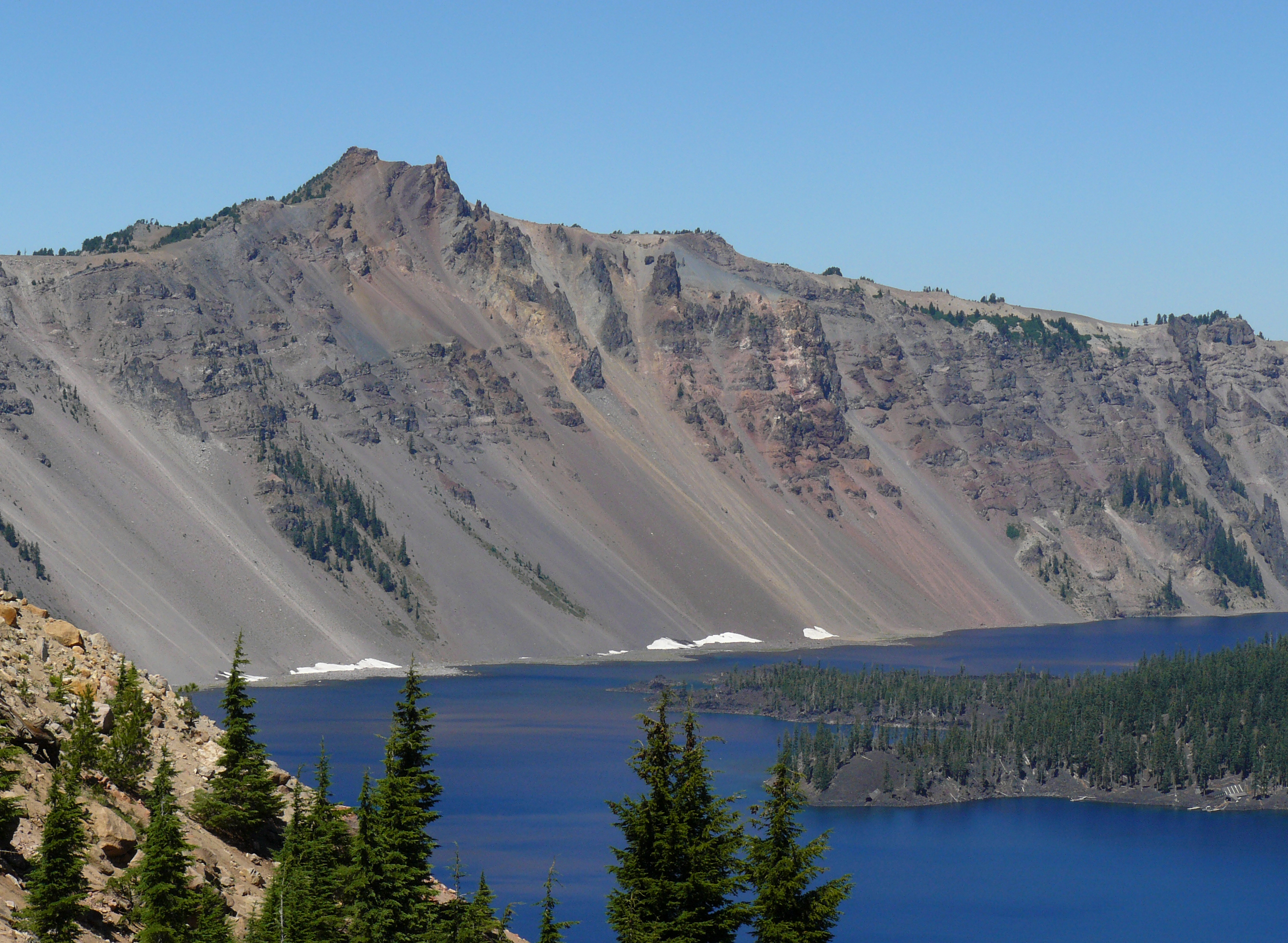

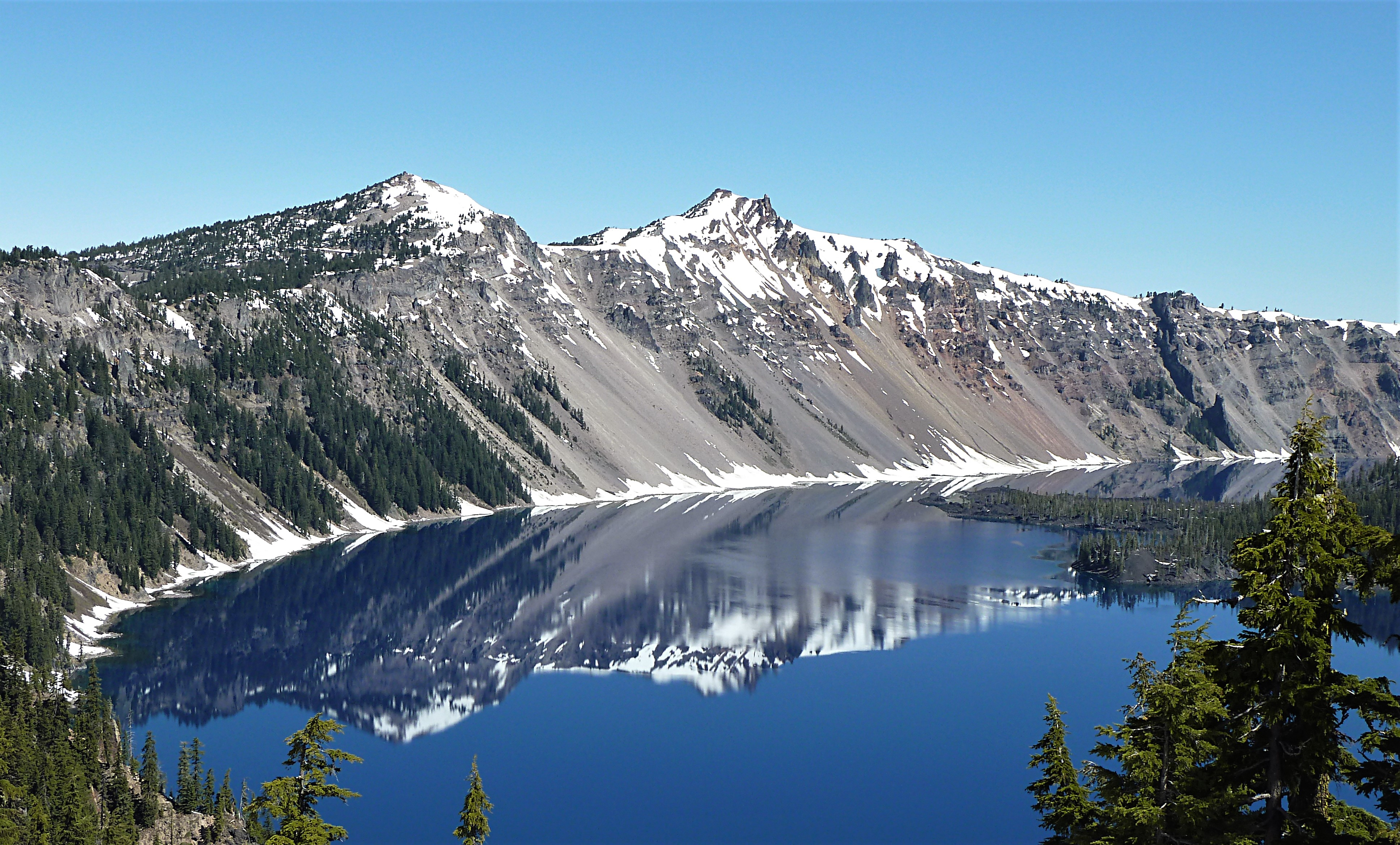
Hillman Peak (center) and The Watchman (left)
