= Mount Mazama =

Complex volcano in the Cascade Range

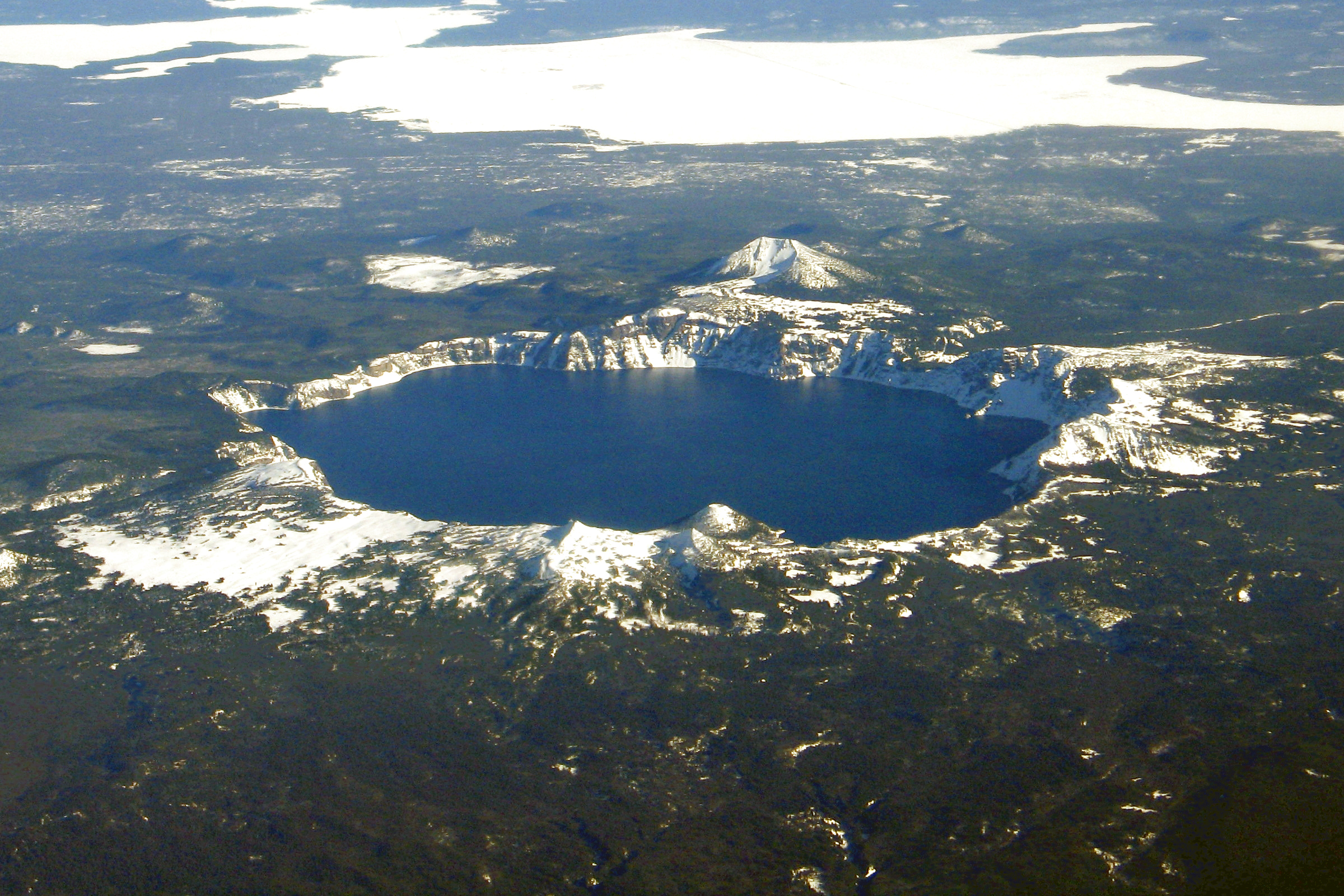
- Mount Mazama collapsed into a caldera, which filled with water to form Crater Lake

Highest point
- Elevation: 8,157 ft (2,486 m)
- Parent peak: Mount Scott
- Listing: Oregon Highest Peaks 76th
- Coordinates: 42°56′N 122°07′W

Naming
- Native name: Tum-sum-ne (Klamath-Modoc)

Geography
- Location within Oregon
- Location: Klamath County, Oregon, U.S.
- Parent range: Cascade Range
- Topo map: USGS Crater Lake East

Geology
- Formed by: Subduction zone volcanism
- Mountain type(s): Stratovolcano, caldera, complex volcano, shield volcano
- Volcanic arc: Cascade Volcanic Arc
- Last eruption: 2850 BC

Climbing
- Easiest route: Drive

Mount Mazama (Klamath: Tum-sum-ne) is a complex volcano in the western U.S. state of Oregon, in a segment of the Cascade Volcanic Arc and Cascade Range. The volcano is in Klamath County, in the southern Cascades, 60 miles (97 km) north of the Oregon–California border. Its collapse, due to the eruption of magma emptying the underlying magma chamber, formed a caldera that holds Crater Lake (Giiwas in the Klamath language). Mount Mazama originally had an elevation of approximately 12,000 feet (3,700 m), but following its climactic eruption this was reduced to 8,157 feet (2,486 m). Crater Lake is 1,943 feet (592 m) deep, the deepest freshwater body in the United States and the second deepest in North America after Great Slave Lake in Canada.

Mount Mazama formed as a group of overlapping volcanic edifices such as shield volcanoes and small composite cones, becoming active intermittently until its climactic eruption 7,700 years ago. This eruption, the largest known within the Cascade Volcanic Arc in a million years, destroyed Mazama's summit, reducing its approximate 12,000-foot (3,700 m) height by almost 4,000 feet (1,200 m). Much of the edifice fell into the volcano's partially emptied neck and magma chamber, creating a caldera. The region's volcanic activity results from the subduction at the Cascadia subduction zone, and is influenced by local extensional faulting. Mazama is dormant, but the U.S. Geological Survey says eruptions on a smaller scale are likely, which would pose a threat to its surroundings.

Native Americans have inhabited the area around Mazama and Crater Lake for at least 10,000 years and the volcano plays an important role in local folklore. European-American settlers first reached the region in the mid-19th century. Since the late 19th century, the area has been extensively studied by scientists for its geological phenomena and more recently for its potential sources of geothermal energy. Crater Lake and Mazama's remnants sustain diverse ecosystems, which are closely monitored by the National Park Service because of their remoteness and ecological importance. Recreational activities including hiking, biking, snowshoeing, fishing, as well as cross-country skiing are available; during the summer, campgrounds and lodges at Crater Lake are open to visitors.

== Geography ==
Mount Mazama is in Klamath County, within the U.S. state of Oregon, 60 miles (97 km) north of the border with California. It lies in the southern portion of the Cascade Range. Crater Lake sits partly inside the volcano's caldera, with a depth of 1,943 feet (592 m); (Note: Crater Lake is listed with depths of 1,943 feet (592 m) or 1,949 feet (594 m).) it is the deepest body of freshwater in the United States and the second deepest in North America after Great Slave Lake in Canada. Before its caldera-forming eruption, Mazama stood at an elevation between 10,800 and 12,100 feet (3,300 and 3,700 m), placing it about 1 mile (1.6 km) above the lake; this would have made it Oregon's highest peak. The Global Volcanism Program currently lists its elevation at 8,157 feet (2,486 m).

=== Crater Lake National Park ===
Crater Lake National Park covers an area of 250 square miles (650 km^{2}), including forest areas, alpine terrain, the Crater Lake, and the vast majority of Mount Mazama. A wilderness area, it was dedicated in 1902 and is overseen by the National Park Service. It receives about 500,000 visitors each year, and these tourists can go hiking, take bike, ranger-guided, and trolley tours, swim, fish, camp, and participate in other recreational activities. While the park area remains open throughout the year, certain roads and facilities close in the winter season.

=== Physical geography ===
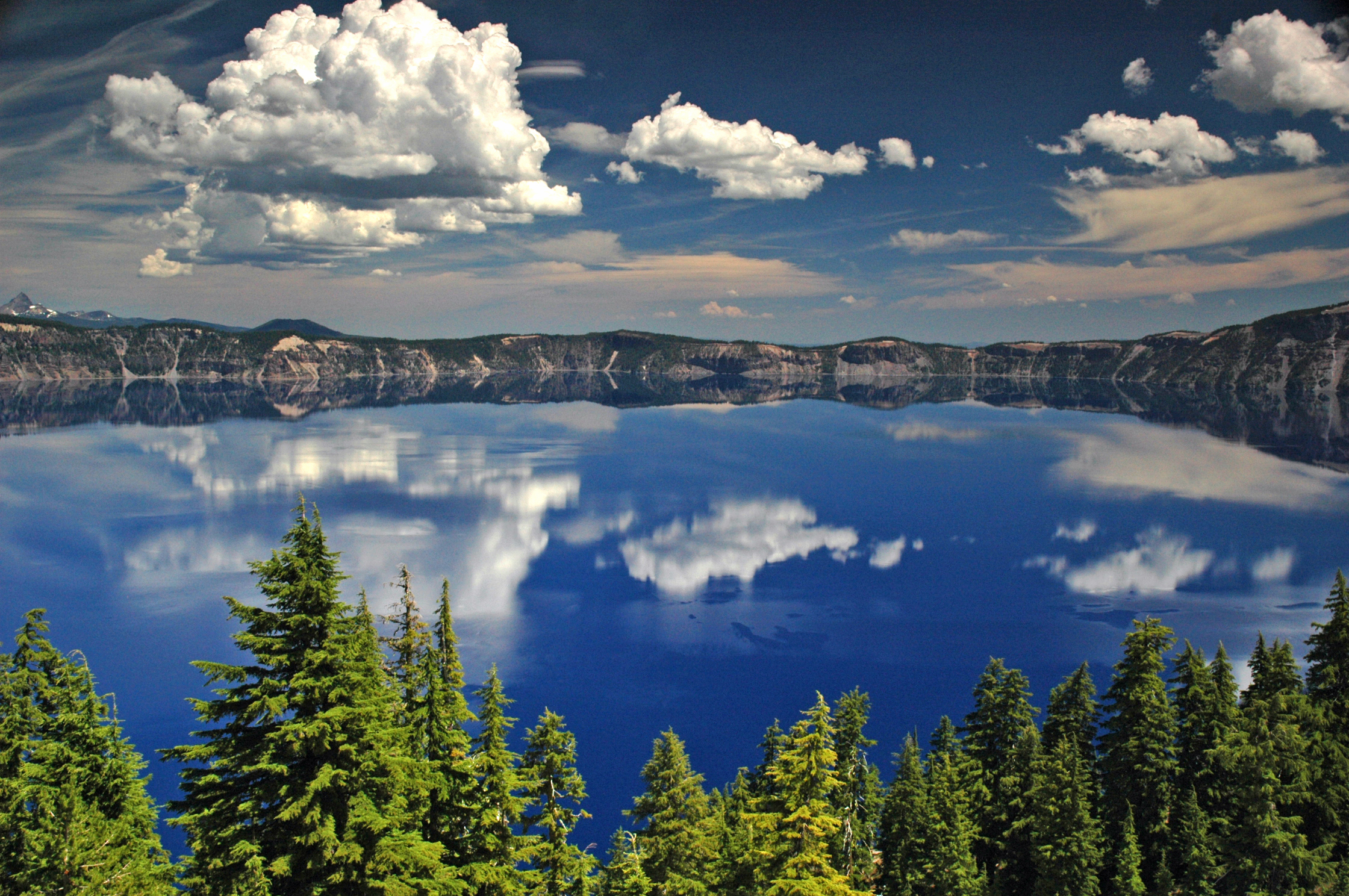
Crater Lake, formed in the caldera from Mazama's collapse

There was frequent glacier formation on the mountain as Mazama developed. They carved trenches in the flanks of the volcano in addition to U-shaped valleys under the base of the volcanic cone. These can be seen at three large glacial canyons on its southern slopes: Kerr Notch, Munson Valley, and Sun Notch. Whenever eruptions took place in the presence of ice, lava was chilled by glaciers, creating glassy talus deposits. Sometimes, the lava coursed into areas previously carved by glaciers like at Sentinel Rock, filling canyons with volcanic rock. Moraines occur up to 17 miles (27 km) from the rim of Mazama's caldera, and there are glacial striations visible at several sites in the area. When the climactic eruption occurred, the climate was warm and dry, and the most recent period of glacial advance ceased about 27,000 years ago, so by the time Mazama collapsed, ice was likely only present at higher elevations. Using argon geochronology and paleoclimatic records, scientists have identified that the Sand Creek, Sun Creek, and Annie Creek canyons were carved by the advance of ice over lava flows, pushing debris towards Klamath Marsh and Klamath Graben or nearby rivers. A glacial cirque can be seen on Mount Scott's northwestern flank, and glacial till occurs on Mazama's slopes, especially on the western slopes and at lower elevations. Till and fluvial sediments occur in the caldera walls, forming particularly thick deposits under Roundtop and Wineglass. Many lava flows that were glaciated have since been covered by more recent lava flows.

Crater Lake formed from a network of lakes and ponds, eventually reaching a depth of 1,949 feet (594 m). Lake levels rose while the Wizard Island landform inside the crater was forming. Water interacted with lava flows to form pillow lava. Because of climate change patterns over time, Crater Lake's surface level has changed, dropping as much as 40 feet (12 m) for example at the beginning of the 20th century. The water from precipitation nearly equals water lost to evaporation and drainage, most leakage taking place at the Wineglass deposit at the northern side of the crater, without which the lake would likely have overflowed at the northern side.

Average snowfall in the Crater Lake area has been decreasing since the 1930s. Crater Lake's mean surface water temperatures have increased about 5 °F (3 °C) since the 1960s. Though this may eventually cause algae to grow and obscure the water, Crater Lake remains one of the cleanest bodies of water in the world.

== Geology ==
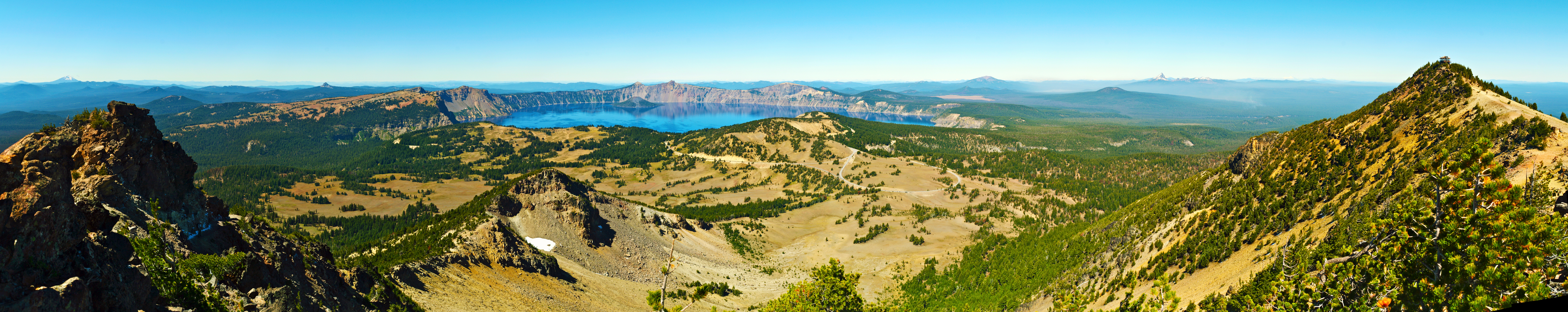
Crater Lake and the Mazama vicinity, as seen from Mount Scott

Produced by the subduction of the Juan de Fuca Plate at the Cascadia subduction zone, which moves slowly in a northeastward direction with the Gorda tectonic plate under the North American tectonic plate, Mazama is part of the Cascade Volcanic Arc that stretches from northern California to southern British Columbia. It sits within a region of crustal extension marked by fault zones, including north–south-trending normal faults such as the Annie Spring fault within the West Klamath Lake fault zone, which might produce damaging earthquakes. Likewise, the Red Cone Spring fault cuts through basaltic andesite deposits at Red Cone from 35,000 years ago; together, the two faults move at an average rate of 0.012 inches (0.3 mm) each year. There do not appear to be faults present in the Crater Lake caldera wall, but the volcano induced a stress field in the upper crust nearby.

Mazama is underlain by the Quaternary High Cascade basalt and mafic (rich in magnesium and iron) andesite to the west and southwest, with high-volume rhyodacite lava flows from 600,000 to 700,000 years old underlying Mazama deposits to the south, southeast, east, and northeast. It is a major Cascade volcano, and is at the intersection of the Cascade Range and Klamath graben, the north–northwest trending basin also surrounded by fault zones. The Basin and Range Province lies to the east. Mazama lies within the broad segment of the Cascades arc, where smaller volcanoes are common because of melting patterns of the Earth's mantle within the region. Erupting magma that ranged from high-alumina olivine tholeiite to magnesian basaltic andesite, these volcanoes show increased contents of subduction-produced or melted fluids that mixed with another magma chamber in the mantle. These magmas vary from 47.6 percent to 73.2 percent silicon dioxide.

Mazama and Crater Lake form part of the Mazama reach (section) of the Oregon Cascades, which stretches for 25 miles (40 km) from Timber Crater to the Big Bunchgrass shield volcano. This includes 175 Quaternary volcanic vents within a belt that ranges from 16 to 19 miles (25 to 30 km) in width, which has a high vent density with many shields and monogenetic volcanic centers. After Newberry Volcano, Mazama is the second largest Quaternary volcanic edifice in Oregon, and the most voluminous, with an overall volume of 29 cubic miles (120 km^{3}). Mazama is the newest of the Quaternary calderas in the Cascade Volcanic Arc, which also include the Newberry calderas and the caldera at the Medicine Lake Volcano. Quaternary monogenetic volcanism throughout Oregon's High Cascades includes cinder cones, lava fields, and small shield volcanoes, which have produced lava ranging from low-potassium, high-alumina olivine tholeiite to medium-potassium calc-alkaline basalt, basaltic andesite to shoshonitic basaltic andesite.

The Mazama volcanic complex originally formed as a cluster of overlapping edifices. Made up of shield volcanoes and small stratocones, it had an irregular shape. Mount Scott, at a height of 8,934 feet (2,723 m), marks the oldest visible remnant of this original cluster. Scott was the first of the composite volcanoes that created the Mazama complex, formed by a quick and active cone-building phase and becoming inactive long before the most recent eruption at Mazama. With time, eruptive activity moved to the west, creating the Applegate Peak and Garfield Peak cones on the southern flanks of the volcanic center. Hawaiian eruptions from neighboring shield volcanoes also built up Mazama, producing basaltic andesite lava flows that ranged from 15 to 20 feet (4.6 to 6.1 m) on average in thickness. These flows, present on the southern, western, and eastern walls of Mazama's caldera, also contained lava bombs. Viscous eruptions of andesitic lava that reached thicknesses of several hundred feet further built up Mazama's cones, creating a solid, dense interior rich with angular lava blocks.

Research by Howel Williams superimposed the Crater Lake caldera on other Cascade stratovolcanoes including Mount Shasta in California and Mount Rainier in Washington state, and concluded that Mazama stood at 12,000 feet (3,700 m) pre-collapse, which has been accepted as the standard estimate by geologists. By the Holocene, the Mazama volcano was made up of several, clustered peaks with Mount Scott on the eastern end and Hillman Peak on the far west side. The volcanoes likely rose in elevation from east to west, and they also featured volcanic cones and lava domes on their southern flanks. Glacial horns like the Watchman lava flow were also present, and the mountain may or may not have sustained glaciers close to the summit. At the time of its collapse, Mount Mazama encompassed an area of 150 square miles (400 km^{2}) and represented one of the major volcanoes in the High Cascades branch of the greater Cascade Range. It was the largest volcanic edifice between Mount Shasta in California and the Three Sisters complex in Oregon. Before the eruption, it had been significantly altered by glacial erosion, which carved U-shaped valleys on its southern and southeastern slopes. The northern and western sides of the caldera do not show prominent evidence of glacial erosion, since they feature lava flows that only underwent alteration by late Pleistocene epoch glacial motion. Outside of the caldera, most hills show evidence of glacial alteration except those from the Holocene epoch and low elevation landforms including Pleistocene lava domes and cinder cones. Mount Scott has also been heavily eroded by ice, and the Union Peak volcano now consists only of a pyramidal horn.

360-degree digital elevation model (DEM) animation of the Mount Mazama caldera topography, highlighting the Wizard Island cinder cone inside the crater.

Though it now has dimensions of 5.0 by 6.2 miles (8 by 10 km) and a width of 5.0 to 6.2 miles (8 to 10 km), scientists think the original collapse diameter was 3.1 miles (5 km). It now includes several small lava domes and cinder cones, including Wizard Island and the underwater volcano Merriam Cone. The highest elevation in the Mazama Complex is now Mount Scott, at an elevation of 8,929 feet (2,722 m), with a relief of 2,000 feet (610 m) above Crater Lake's surface waters. Except for the tallest slopes of the complex, all cones have been covered with deposits from the climactic eruption at Mazama 7,700 years ago. Scientists now use the exposed contents of the caldera rim wall to investigate eruptions and mapping the eruptive history of the region. Throughout its known eruptions, Mazama has produced 43 percent rhyodacite, 42 percent andesite, 15 percent dacite, and less than 1 percent basaltic andesite. All of the rhyodacite has been produced within the past 30,000 years of activity, suggesting that regional and local distribution of compositions were not uniform over time. Andesite and dacite lava flows from the volcano usually have plagioclase as their major phenocryst, though augite and hypersthene are also present, the latter more abundant. Olivine form minor phenocrysts, which are found throughout lava flows from Mazama, and hornblende can be found in some andesite lava flows. Basalt and mafic andesite lava flows from Mazama and nearby eruptive vents have relatively higher amounts of olivine and lack hypersthene, and the mafic andesite deposits display textures that indicate they underwent greater mixing than andesite and dacite deposits.

=== Subfeatures ===
Formed of a complex of stratovolcanoes and shield volcanoes, there are about 35 known satellite vents in the Mazama complex. Mazama is surrounded by monogenetic cinder cones, lava fields, and shield volcanoes made up of calc-alkaline basalt and andesite, tholeiite, and shoshonitic andesite. Varying in age from 600,000 to 40,000 years old, these edifices closely resemble other monogenetic volcanoes in the High Cascades. Extending from the eastern half of Mazama and to the southeast lies a volcanic field consisting of rhyodacitic lava domes and lava flows between 700,000 and 600,000 years old, which encompasses an area of more than 140 square miles (350 km^{2}). This large field is underlain by rhyodacite in its southeastern segment, and is cut by north–south trending normal faults.

Moving from west to northwest, Mazama stratovolcanoes and shield volcanoes grow progressively younger. The oldest, at 400,000 years old, occur at Phantom Ship and Mount Scott, while the youngest can be found at the Hillman Peak stratovolcano, dated to 70,000 years old. There are also andesite flows at the northern rim of Mazama dated to between 50,000 and 40,000 years old. Shield volcanoes near Mazama feature lava flows made of agglutinated mafic andesite, which form sheets about 16-foot (5 m) thick, as well as more deposits from more viscous andesite and dacite magma that reach thicknesses up to 98 feet (30 m). Many of these deposits (both dacitic and andesitic) contain undercooled, crystal-poor segments of andesite, including at Mount Scott and Phantom Cone. Lava and ice interactions are suggested by exposures of glassy breccia in Mazama's caldera, as well as lava flows covering glaciated lava deposits.

About 70,000 years ago, several silicic (rich in silicon dioxide), explosive eruptions occurred, including a significant event at Pumice Castle on the eastern wall of Mazama. This formed welded deposits near the vent, also forming non-welded deposits to the south and on the northern part of Mazama. Between 40,000 years ago and Mazama's major eruption, no andesitic or dacitic volcanism took place. However, rhyodacitic magma was erupted at Grouse Hill, Steel Bay, and Redcloud Cliff in the form of pumice and lava flows made of hornblende-phyric, or chemically evolved, rhyodacite. During this period of the late Pleistocene or early Holocene, lava domes such as those at Sharp Peak, Grouse Hill, and Merriam Point formed, sharing chemical compositions, with silica contents at about 70%.

Pyroclastic cones at Mazama include Wizard Island, Bald Crater, Maklaks Crater (also known as Diller Cone) and Forgotten Cone. In addition to its crater, referred to as Williams Crater or the Forgotten Crater, Mazama's various volcanic vents occur at Cleetwood, Llao Rock, and Redcloud, which are at elevations of 7,005 feet (2,135 m), 8,045 feet (2,452 m), and 7,949 feet (2,423 m), respectively. Nearby cinder cones include Bear Butte, Crater Peak, Desert Cone, Lookout Butte, Pothole Butte, Red Cone, Scout Hill, and Union Peak. There are at least 13 cinder cones within Crater Lake National Park, and at least eleven more in the nearby area. They were fed by a different magma chamber than Mazama, though they likely received magma from basaltic andesite reservoirs in the vicinity. The exception is Williams crater, which erupted basalt and dacite and got silicic lava from the western part of Mazama's magma chamber. Stratovolcanoes in Mazama's vicinity consist of Sentinel Rock, Mount Scott, Phantom Cone, Dutton Cliff, and Danger Bay.

Mazama has a few composite cones in the vicinity of the caldera. At about 420,000 years old, Mount Scott has a conical shape, but has been extensively altered by Pleistocene glacial erosion, which carved a large cirque on its western flank and smaller ones on its eastern and northeastern sides. Scott lacks a summit crater. Hillman Peak was the youngest composite cone in the Mazama eruptive center, forming about 70,000 years ago. It lies on the southwestern side of the caldera, and it represents the highest point on the Mazama rim, rising 2,000 feet (610 m) above Crater Lake. The cone was cut down the middle during Mazama's collapse post-eruption, creating a cross-section of its interior composition.

Shield volcanoes that contributed to Mazama's growth only erupted for several hundred to several thousand years. They erupted rapidly, spraying fluid lava that included lava bombs and incandescent fragments. Llao shield on the northwestern side of the Mazama complex shows a representative structure for the shields that helped form Mazama.

== Eruptive history ==
=== Early activity ===
The Mazama vicinity formed gradually, its earliest deposits consisting of dacite from up to 1.28 million years ago. Between 725,000 and 500,000 years ago, rhyodacite was erupted, eventually forming a lava dome field with a volume of 4.8 cubic miles (20 km^{3}) and dimensions of 9.9 by 14.9 miles (16 by 24 km). This featured up to 40 rhyodacitic domes and lava flows, produced between 470,000 and 410,000 years ago before stratocone formation began.

Mazama formed as a group of overlapping volcanic edifices, which included shield volcanoes and small composite cones. Cone-building eruptions took place within short periods of time. Shield volcanoes fed Mazama's expansion with basaltic andesite lava flows that covered large expanses on the slopes of the mountain. Forming lava fountains similar to those observed in Hawaiian eruptions, the shield volcanoes erupted incandescent lava bombs and were deposited on the southern, western, and eastern flanks of the complex. They have average thicknesses of 15 to 20 feet (4.6 to 6.1 m). Roughly 215,000 years ago, another flank vent erupted dacitic lava that coursed to the west for at least 6.2 miles (10 km), with volcanic dikes that trend toward the vent still present in the Mazama caldera wall. The complex remained inactive for about 40,000 years before it resumed activity, erupting andesitic lava from another flank vent, building a large shield volcano from 170,000 to 120,000 years ago. Other andesitic lava deposits can be observed in the caldera wall's northern side. The Mazama complex was inactive between 100,000 and 75,000 years ago. About 75,000 years ago, the volcano erupted effusive lava flows of andesite that formed 980-foot (300 m) thick deposits below Hillman Peak that extended at least 4.3 miles (7 km) from the caldera rim.

Many of the major cone-creating eruptions at Mazama were effusive rather than violently explosive, but explosive eruptions about 70,000 years ago yielded silicic lava that created thick pyroclastic deposits. These deposits include Pumice Castle, an orange edifice at the eastern wall of the caldera, which formed by the fusion of glassy pumice fragments. Similar activity on the northern side of Cloudcap and the eastern segment of Llao Rock that ejected dacitic tephra and pyroclastic rock also formed fused edifices. About 50,000 years ago, a vent at Mazama erupted the Watchman flow, which filled a canyon at the southwestern wall of the complex. From 50,000 to 40,000 years ago, Mazama vents continued to erupt andesite lava flows onto the northern and southwestern slopes and create dacite lava domes on the southern flanks. These domes often collapsed and produced pyroclastic flows that coursed down the southern slope of the volcano, forming deposits up to Devil's Backbone, a craggy volcanic dike that was exhumed when the volcano collapsed.

Throughout its eruptive history, Mazama has produced basaltic andesite, andesite, and dacite lava. About 40,000 years ago, it underwent a dramatic shift to solely rhyodacite lava, which was highly viscous and had a silica content at about 70 percent. Between 30,000 and 25,000 years ago, rhyodacitic eruptions occurred at the complex, yielding pumiceous tephra and lava flows from Grouse Hill, Steel Bay, and Redcloud Cliff. At Redcloud Cliff, a lava flow formed with glassy columns that touched glaciers, creating a large, inverted stone triangle on the eastern rim of Mazama. These same eruptions formed a nearly vertical-walled crater, producing pumice and creating a dome over the Redcloud vent. Grouse Hill's lava flow deposit and lava dome formed at about the same time, about 27,000 years ago. At the end of this eruptive sequence, rhyodacite lava domes formed on the northeastern slopes of the volcano.

Between 100 and 200 years before the climactic eruption, Llao Rock, a 1,200-foot (370 m) thick block of dark lava with a volume of 0.25 cubic miles (1.0 km^{3}), was produced from a rhyodacite flow erupted from Mazama. It has a round center and extensions on the sides, resembling a bird of prey. The formation of Llao Rock was preceded by explosive eruptions of rhyodacite, creating pumice and ash that were ejected high into the atmosphere and carried for several hundred miles into northern and eastern Washington state, eastern Oregon, and western Nevada. A large crater formed but was filled by subsequent lava flows. Shortly before the major, caldera-forming eruption at Mazama, the Cleetwood flow was produced. Also composed of rhyodacite lava, it originated from a vent on the northern side of the complex eastward of Llao Rock. It likely only occurred weeks or months before the major eruption, as Mazama's collapse formed a backward flow of lava when it cut through the Cleetwood lava, suggesting that the Cleetwood lava was still hot enough to flow and move. Tephra from the last major eruption that was emplaced atop Cleetwood deposits has been altered by heat and gas from the Cleetwood lava. Both these eruptive periods took place on the northern flank of the Mazama complex, not far from the magma chamber that produced the climactic eruption shortly after.

=== Climactic eruption ===
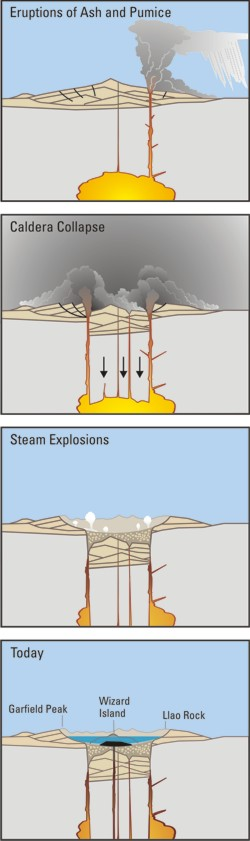
An overall timeline for the Mazama eruptions

Mazama's climactic eruption has been dated to about 6,845 ± 50 years ago via radiocarbon dating, or about 7,700 years ago via dendrochronology. Other scientists have determined ages of 6,730 ± 40 years ago or roughly 7,470–7,620 calendar years ago, as well as 7,627 ± 150 calendar years ago. Fallout from the eruption continued for roughly three years, though the major eruption only occurred for a few days. The eruption is thought to have occurred during autumn, as inferred from pollen data.

The eruptive activity that led to Mazama's collapse proceeded in two phases. During the first phase, shortly after the eruption of the Cleetwood flow, a vent at a higher elevation on the northern side of the Mazama complex (but still below the summit) produced a 30-mile (48 km) high ash column into the stratosphere and ejecting over half the eruption's total magma. The second stage erupted material from a ring of vents. Ash extended to eight states in the west and three Canadian provinces. As a result, Mazama Ash has become a commonly used benchmark for measuring the relative age of objects, compared to its orange colored deposits. Pumice deposits reached depths of 20 feet (6.1 m) adjacent to Mazama's base, still reaching thicknesses more than 1 foot (0.30 m) as far as 70 miles (110 km) to the northeast. The ejecta featured blocks of medium-grain granodiorite, as well as inclusions of diabase, quartz diorite, granite, aplite, and granophyre. Ashfall layers have been eroded by pyroclastic flows and with time, but they are still visible at Hillman Peak and along the Cleetwood Trail. The Plinian column from the eruption devastated the area hundreds of miles north and northeast of Mazama, but to the southwest and west, little pumice or ash were deposited.

The eruption's character changed dramatically as the column of pumice and ash collapsed. The exact cause is not well understood; it may have been the result of the enormous weight of the tephra or the expansion of the eruptive vent. The sudden deposition of so much pumice generated pyroclastic flows that moved down the northern side of the volcano, coursing west–east from Llao Rock to Redcloud Cliff. The first of these pyroclastic flows were deposited at superheated temperatures, welding fragments and creating the Wineglass welded tuff, which consists of big blocks of orange-brown and gray rock. These emplacements can only be observed on the northern slopes; they are absent from the southern slopes of the volcano.

Mazama was covered with incandescent pumice. The extreme weight of eruptive material began to push down on the volcano's summit, similar to a piston. Eventually, the top of Mazama's magma chamber subsided, and concentric openings formed by the summit, producing smaller vents surrounding the main eruptive cone. Pumice ejected from these new fractures created rapid pyroclastic flows that coursed down all the sides of Mazama, traveling over tall ridges and summits of subfeatures and extending tens of miles from their vents. These flows altered the surfaces surrounding Mazama, removing ashfall and then depositing their contents in nearby valleys. Some of the flows traveled more than 40 miles (64 km) from their source, destroying timber in their paths, while others deposited their rock into river valleys to the north and west of Mazama, leaving layers of pumice between 20 and 30 feet (6.1 and 9.1 m) in thickness. Ash clouds also rose up from the pyroclastic flows. Pyroclastic flows also moved to the east, reaching more than 25 miles (40 km) from the base of Mazama. These deposits have diameters between 1 and 2 feet (0.30 and 0.61 m), though they are punctuated by pumice blocks with diameters of 6 feet (1.8 m) that extend as far as 20 miles (32 km) from Mazama's summit. Flows containing pumice coursed into the Annie Creek and Sun Creek canyons southward of Mazama, depositing 250 feet (76 m) of material, which have still not been fully eroded after almost 8,000 years. To the southeast, pyroclastic flows coursed into Sand Creek and extended more than 10 miles (16 km) in that direction, some reaching Klamath Marsh, the Williamson River, and the Klamath Lakes.

Mazama's eruptive activity drew from deeper layers of the magma chamber that fed its climactic eruption, with denser layers of andesite and basaltic andesite lying beneath lighter layers of rhyodacite. The last of the pyroclastic flows erupted contained andesitic, gray scoria that was deposited above the pale orange and yellow rhyodacite pumice from earlier phases of the eruption. The final eruptions formed the Pumice Desert, a treeless plain on the northern and northeastern side of Mazama, as well as filling the Pumice Creek valley and parts of the Klamath Marsh. Reaching thicknesses between 250 and 300 feet (76 and 91 m), the emplacements from these flows yielded fumarolic activity, still detectable in the Annie Creek and Sand Creek canyons. Erosion from rain and stream flow has left pipes from the andesitic lava flows as columns and spires.

Before collapse due to eruption of magma emptying the underlying magma chamber, the Mazama edifice had an estimated volume of 27 cubic miles (112 km^{3}), though it may have exceeded 31 cubic miles (130 km^{3}) taking glacial erosion into account. After the climactic eruption, Mazama's peak was completely destroyed, replaced by a depression with a depth of 4,000 feet (1,200 m) surrounded by cliffs. The volume of magma erupted from Mazama during this eruption was 14 cubic miles (61 km^{3}). The lava produced was zoned vertically according to arrangement within the source magma chamber, and was calc-alkaline in composition. It consisted of roughly 90 percent uniform rhyodacitic pumice, which contained about 10 percent phenocrysts, the rest made up of crystalline andesite scoria and mafic crystals. The total eruptive volume adds up to 42 cubic miles (176 km^{3}) of pumice, ignimbrite, and tephra. The eruption released aerosols that lowered temperatures globally in the Northern Hemisphere, with estimates of 1.1 to 1.3 °F (0.6 to 0.7 °C) for one to three years after the eruption. The temperature changes were possibly greater than the effects of the 1815 eruption of Mount Tambora. Mazama's climactic eruption produced stratospheric mass loadings of 97,000,000 to 247,000,000 short tons (88 to 224 Mt) of sulfuric acid, with an estimated minimum sulfate degassing of 102,400,000 short tons (92.9 Mt) during its eruption. Aerosol from the eruption traveled as far as Greenland, falling for as long as six years.

The United States Geological Survey has referred to the Mazama eruption of 7,700 years ago as the largest explosive eruption within the Cascades in the past million years, however recent studies say that the volume of the Rockland ash, which erupted from the Lassen Volcanic Center about 600,000 years ago could be up to 326.7 km^{3}, which would make it over twice the size of the Mazama ash. Mazama's climactic eruption was one of the largest eruptions during the Holocene epoch. Considering Mazama's eruptive output within the past 420,000 years, it may have produced more than 43 cubic miles (180 km^{3}) of eruptive volume, making it either the third or fourth most productive Quaternary volcanic center in the Cascade Range. The eruption had a Volcanic Explosivity Index (VEI) of 7, as determined from eruption cloud height, eruptive volume, and qualitative observations.

==== Mazama Ash ====
In the western United States and Canada, volcanic ash often forms distinct layers among recent geological deposits, which can be used for stratigraphy among geologists and archaeologists. Given the large distribution of the historic eruption of Mount Mazama, Mazama Ash serves as a common geological marker. Mazama Ash had a minimum fallout area of 350,000 square miles (900,000 km^{2}), while ash from northwestern Washington's Glacier Peak volcano, known as Glacier Peak Ash, encompassed an area of more than 100,000 square miles (260,000 km^{2}). Mazama Ash is found at a higher layer than the Glacier Peak ash, estimated to have deposited over 13,000 years ago. Mazama Ash is the most widely distributed tephra layer from the late Quaternary in the United States and southwestern Canada, extending to eight states to the west and three Canadian provinces. It forms orange colored deposits.

Like the Glacier Peak Ash deposits, Mazama Ash is well preserved in the Pacific Northwest. It is distinguishable from the lump pumice deposits ejected from the Glacier Peak volcano, which contain more phenocrysts. Mazama Ash also has more soda, yttrium, ytterbium, and zirconium, and less silica and lime than eruptive products from Glacier Peak, and it forms finer deposits than Glacier Peak Ash.

With an age between 6,000 and 7,000 years, Mazama Ash corresponds to the estimated time for Mazama's climactic eruption 6,600 years ago, identified by radiocarbon dating of wood charred by ashflows. Some of the Glacier Peak ash has been found in strata beneath Mazama Ash in Washington state and in eastern Idaho, 419 miles (675 km) to the southeast of Glacier Peak. Studies of Glacier Peak Ash deposits suggest that they are older than Mazama Ash, at about 12,000 years old. Glacier Peak Ash has not been found in deposits less than 10,000 years old, and nearly all human artifacts have been found above its deposits, except for a site at Birch Creek where non-diagnostic artifacts were discovered beneath Glacier Peak Ash.

=== Recent activity and potential hazards ===
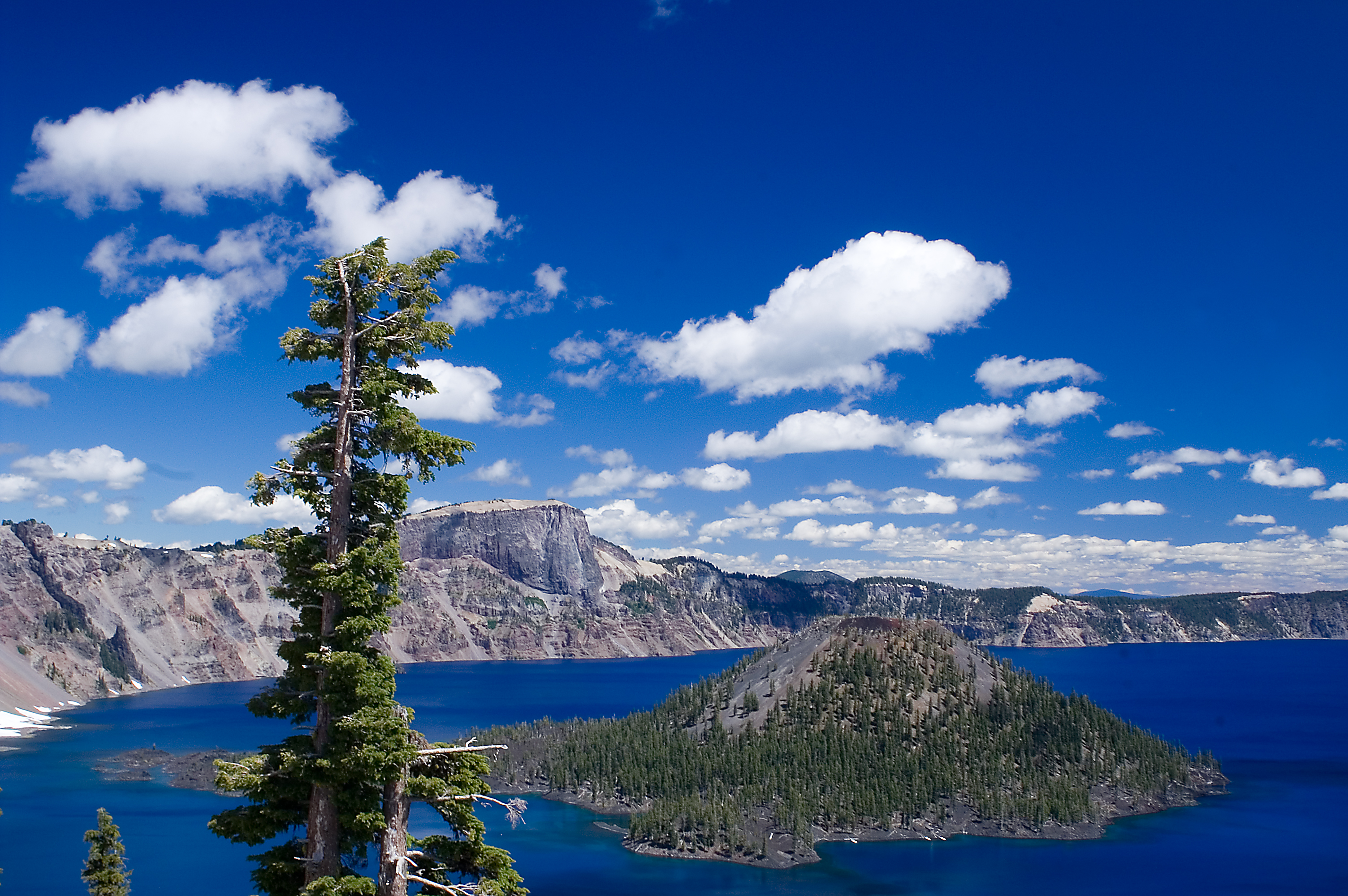
Postcaldera activity has included the production of the Wizard Island cinder cone volcano in Crater Lake

Since the climactic eruption 7,700 years ago, all eruptive activity at Mazama has occurred within the caldera. After the caldera formed, the original crater was widened by avalanches from the walls. These gave a scalloped profile to the caldera, such as the coves at Llao Bay, Steel Bay, and Grotto Cove. The Chaski slide, for example, the most prominent landslide detectable on the caldera wall, occurred long after the formation of the crater. Located on the southern side, it contains lava blocks between 850 and 1,400 feet (260 and 430 m) in length, many of which now reside underwater on the floor of Crater Lake. As the crater filled with landslides, lava, and water, the caldera's appearance changed over time. New cones and lava fields have formed inside the caldera, all of which have been submerged except for Wizard Island. Mapping the caldera floor with high-resolution multibeam echo sounders, vehicle-motion sounders and navigators, and a dual-differential global positioning system (DGPS), scientists from the US government and universities detected volcanoes and landslide deposits under the water. Between 7,700 and 7,200 years ago, the central lava platform, the Merriam Cone, and Wizard Island were produced, as well as lava flows. These eruptions produced 1 cubic mile (4.2 km^{3}) of andesitic lava, half of that in the Wizard Island cone. Wizard Island lava interacted with water to form breccia piles, and as the water levels rose, only the top of the Wizard Island edifice stayed above the water. The edifice has a lavaberg shape, as it sits above a larger, ovular pedestal rising 1,200 feet (370 m) above the floor of Crater Lake; just two percent of Wizard Island sits above the water surface. At the summit of the above-water cone, a small lava flow from a lava fountain appears, on the southwestern flank. There is also a volcanic plug poking out of the crater floor as a body of dark lava. Lava blocks with diameters of 6 to 7 feet (1.8 to 2.1 m) can be seen along the rim of the crater, possibly produced from later stages of cone-building eruptions that created Wizard Island. The central platform was created by a similar vent eastward of Wizard Island, made up of effusive lava that created lava fields northward and eastward of its vent. Merriam Cone does not have a summit crater, but rises to 1,300 feet (400 m) above the northern lake floor. Merriam Cone was produced underwater, and was probably formed at the same or similar time as Wizard Island and the central platform.

Mazama was last active about 4,800 years ago, when an eruption took place near Wizard Island's eastern base. This eruption took place underwater, and it produced viscous lava that created a rhyodacite lava dome, about 2,400 years after the first period of postcaldera activity. Given that Mazama has had periods of sporadic eruptions for 420,000 years, the United States Geological Survey thinks that it is "virtually certain" that Mazama will erupt again in the future. Mazama is considered dormant, but it remains monitored by the United States Geological Survey Cascades Volcano Observatory. Future eruptions would likely take place near the western side of the complex and within the caldera rim; they could occur underwater. The ejection of lava rich in gas from shallow water could produce huge ash columns, but submarine eruptions at deeper depths may decrease the explosiveness of the event. Nonetheless, the rapid mixing of water and lava could produce dangerous pyroclastic surges, which are more gaseous and less solid than pyroclastic flows. Such flows could pass over topographic barriers, move rock fragments at 800 feet per second (240 m/s), and travel several miles from their vent. Mazama is unlikely to produce mudflows far from the caldera, though a nearby vent outside the caldera could erupt and mix with snow. Eruptions are unlikely to produce waves that extend beyond Crater Lake, but powerful explosions could produce tall waves in the caldera. An eruption as explosive as the one 7,700 years ago is unlikely given that it would require larger volumes of magma than are known to be available within the Mazama vicinity. Landslides could flood adjacent shoreline regions, but they are not likely to induce failure of the caldera's walls, as they rise more than 500 feet (150 m) above the lake's surface. Earthquakes from the nearby West Klamath Lake fault zone could reach magnitudes up to 7.0 on the Richter scale, but these only occur every 3,000 to 10,000 years; they could generate tall waves by creating landslides. Though local earthquakes from volcanic activity would create motion in the lake, they would likely only reach maximum magnitudes of 5.0 on the Richter scale. Crater Lake is poorly monitored, and not highly active seismically among the Cascade volcanoes. The largest earthquake threat originates from the Cascadia subduction zone, which could produce earthquakes with a magnitude of 8 or 9 that could lead to huge waves in Crater Lake.

Though the population within 6.2 miles (10 km) of Mount Mazama is only about 50 people, more than 270,000 live within 62 miles (100 km) of the volcano. Even so, highly consequential eruptions at Mazama seem unlikely in the near future. Large, pyroclastic eruptions like the climactic eruption are unlikely for thousands of years. Similarly, the release of lethal gases like carbon dioxide from Crater Lake, similar to the eruption from Lake Nyos in Cameroon in 1986, is unlikely as a result of the natural mixing of deep and surface water within the lake. There is no known mechanism by which Crater Lake's water could be catastrophically drained or by which the caldera walls would fail suddenly. Minor hydrothermal explosions could still potentially be dangerous, as the ejection of ballistic blocks or tall waves could threaten people standing near the lake, traveling at speeds from 330 to 820 feet per second (100 to 250 m/s). Landslides could threaten visitors to the national park or researchers by creating tsunami-sized waves, also potentially damaging infrastructure surrounding the lake.

== Geothermal energy ==
Studies of heat flow and the water chemistry in Crater Lake and the alteration of rocks older than 120,000 years ago suggest that hydrothermal areas exist in the Mazama vicinity. Most springs show similar chemistry, from the weathering of volcanic glass and clinopyroxene. These features probably formed due to processes related to residual heat from the magma chamber that produced the climactic Mazama eruption 7,700 years ago. The lake shows convective mixing that cycles every three years as thermal fluid moves into the lake through its floor, creating thermal springs that formed silica spires with heights up to 33 feet (10 m). As a result, the California Energy Company drilled two geothermal exploration wells: the MZI-11A with a depth of 4,669 feet (1,423 m) to the east of the national park barrier at the Scott Creek Drainage, and the MZII-1 with a depth of 2,844 feet (867 m) to the south of the same boundary and to the east of Annie Creek. The maximum temperature they have observed at the southern well is 104 °F (40 °C), while the maximum temperature was 266 °F (130 °C) at the eastern well. The convective heat discharge in Crater Lake marks the third largest in the Cascades, after the Austin Hot Springs and at Lassen Volcanic National Park. Scientists from the United States Geological Survey think that sources for geothermal energy use exist at Mazama and Crater Lake.

== Ecology ==
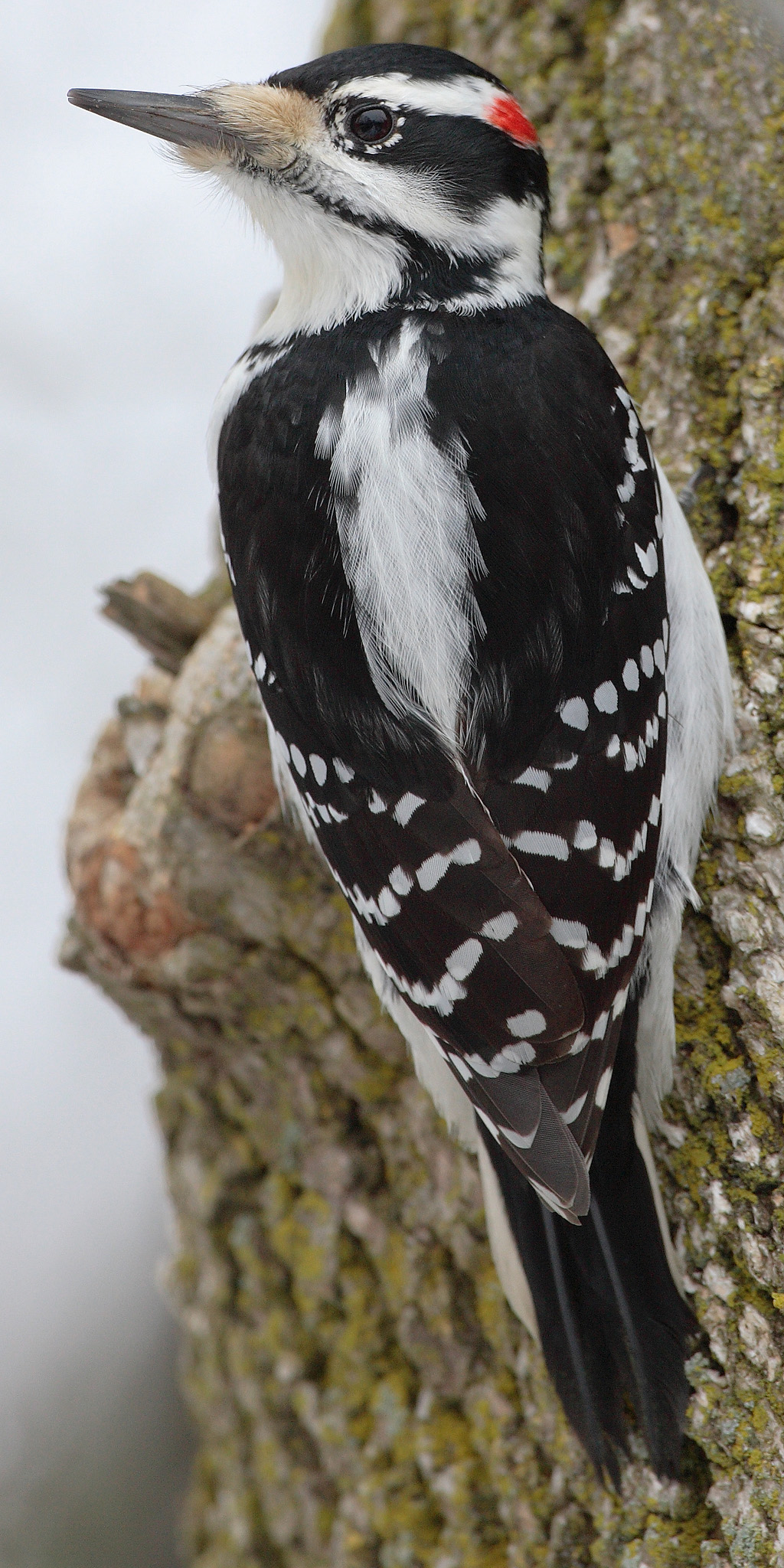
Hairy woodpeckers are one of many common bird species in the Mazama and Crater Lake National Park area

Crater Lake National Park and the area surrounding Mount Mazama range in elevation from 4,000 to 8,929 feet (1,219 to 2,722 m), providing diverse habitats. In the Cascades, the topography and elevation have influenced local climate patterns, also shaping global climate when volcanic gas and dust have been released into the atmosphere. The southern region of the park supports ponderosa pine forests, and for elevations from 5,000 to 7,000 feet (1,500 to 2,100 m), mixed coniferous, fir, and hemlock forests are common. Subalpine zones occur above 7,000 feet (2,100 m), often featuring whitebark pine.

Ecological disturbances tend to cause decreasing damage with increasing distance from the source, but volcanic eruptions can lead to more uniform patterns of disruption for their surrounding landscapes. The immediate surroundings of Mazama continue to recover from the eruption.

There are more than 50 mammal species in Crater Lake National Park. Opossum species such as the Virginia opossum can be found infrequently, while shrew and mole species in the park area include marsh shrews, Pacific shrews, American water shrews, fog shrews, Trowbridge's shrews, vagrant shrews, American shrew moles, and broad-footed moles. Bats frequently sighted within the park area include the little brown bat, hoary bat, and big brown bat, while the California myotis, silver-haired bat, Yuma myotis, long-eared myotis, long-legged myotis, and pallid bat are more rare. There are populations of American pikas, snowshoe hares, and white-tailed jackrabbits in the region, as well as many rodent species. Chipmunks like yellow-pine chipmunks, least chipmunks, Siskiyou chipmunks, and Townsend's chipmunks can be seen, along with various beaver species including mountain beavers and North American beavers. The mammals of the National Park area also include various species of squirrel, mice, vole, and gophers, as well as yellow-bellied marmots and North American porcupines. Carnivorous mammals consist of coyotes, red foxes, gray foxes, American black bears, raccoons, martens, fishers, ermines, long-tailed weasels, minks, wolverines, American badgers, western spotted skunks, striped skunks, North American river otters, cougars, and lynxes such as bobcats. Elk, mule deer, and pronghorns can also be found, though more frequently during the summer season.

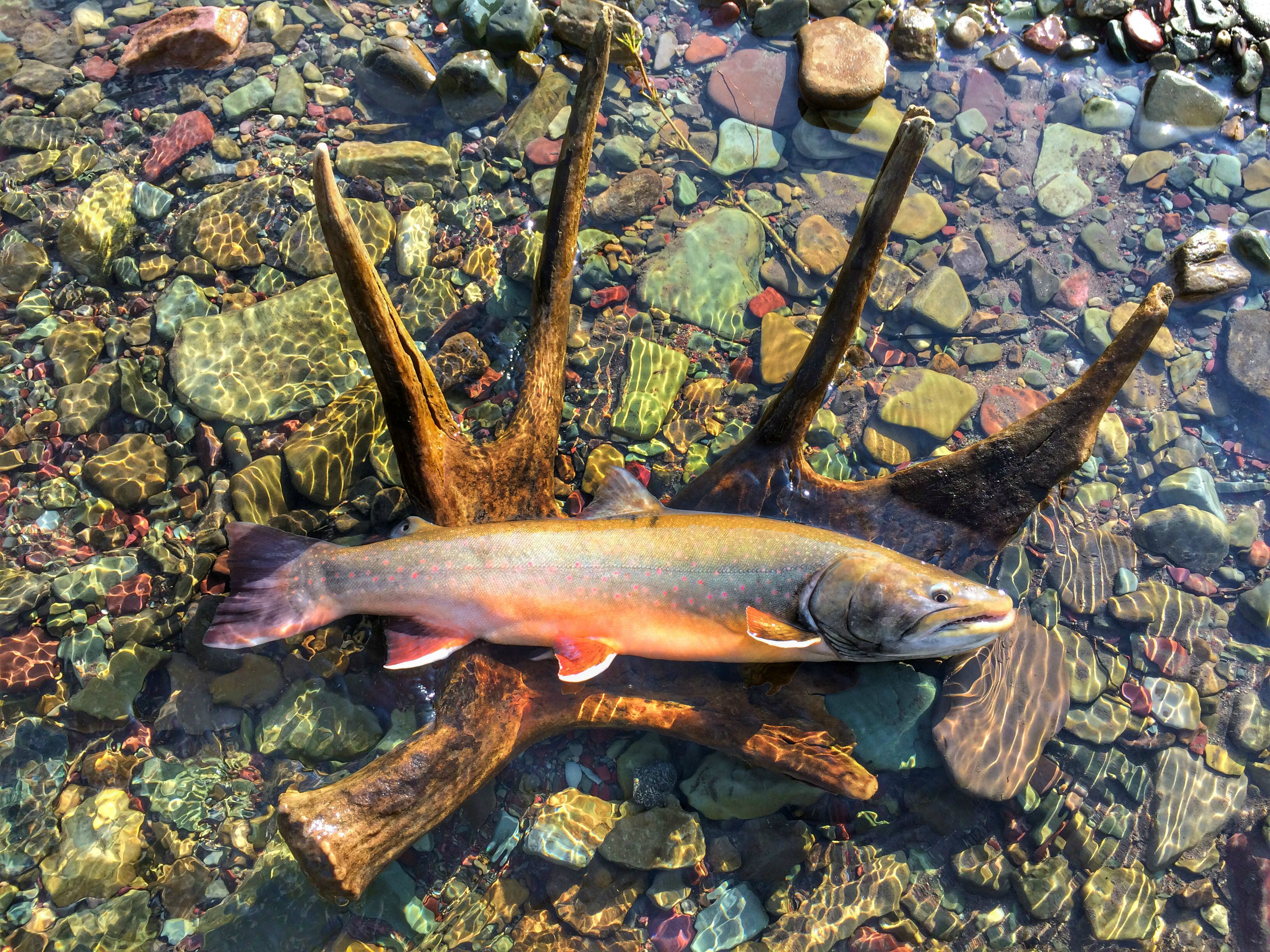
Bull trout in the Crater Lake National park area saw a significant decline during the early 20th century, but conservation programs have expanded their distribution

Bird species in the Crater Lake National Park area include various taxonomic families. Common bird species include hairy woodpeckers, great horned owls, blue grouse, common ravens, dark-eyed juncos, mountain chickadees, red-breasted nuthatches, brown creepers, Clark's nutcrackers, and Canada jays, which are visible throughout the year; American kestrels, northern flickers, golden-crowned kinglets, Cordilleran flycatchers, Steller's jays, western tanagers, Swainson's thrushes, hermit thrushes, American robins, and rufous hummingbirds that frequent the area in the summer season; and mountain and western bluebirds in the fall and summer. Olive-sided flycatchers and chipping sparrows are common during the spring and summer seasons, while yellow-rumped warblers, pine siskins, and Cassin's finches can frequently be seen during spring, summer, and fall.

In the early 20th century, Bull trout were present in many streams and rivers throughout the National Park area, particularly the Sun Creek and lower Annie Creek areas. Locals began stocking streams with non-native trout populations, forcing Brook trout to compete for resources and leading to their local extinction in Annie Creek, along with a significant decline in Sun Creek by the end of the 1980s. By 1992, Crater Lake National Park initiated a bull trout conservation project, removing invasive fish populations with electrofishing, snorkeling, and introduction of the toxin and inhibitor of cellular respiration antimycin A. They also created small barriers to keep new trout from reaching Sun Creek. In 1999, Bull trout were considered a "threatened" species by the Endangered Species Act, though locally, there are now about 2,000 Bull trout in the stream, almost ten times as many as the low point for Bull trout abundance at just 200 fish. The project now works with the state government to expand Bull trout distributions from Sun Creek into neighboring forests with fish barriers and removal of invasive fish species.

Climate change threatens the American pika populations in the Crater Lake area, as they cannot tolerate warm weather because their fur does not release heat efficiently. Climate change might be diminishing their food supply via disturbances of vegetation growth patterns. At least three pika populations in Oregon have disappeared within the past few decades. Likewise, as a result of climate change, mountain pine beetle infestations have become more frequent among Whitebark pines on the rim of Crater Lake and present on nearby peaks. The National Park Service estimates that roughly half of the whitebark pines in Crater Lake National Park have died or are dying. Because the ecosystem in Crater Lake is isolated from the regional area, it holds particular interest from ecologists, so the United States National Park Service closely monitors human and natural changes to the lake environment.

== Human history ==
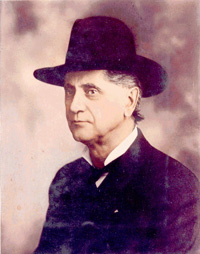
The English name for the volcano, "Mount Mazama", came from William G. Steel, founder of The Mazamas climbing club

The Klamath Native Americans of the area believed that Mount Mazama was inhabited by Llao, Chief of the Below World. The Klamaths recounted the eruption as a great battle between Llao and his rival, the sky god Skell, Chief of the Above World. A common variant of the legend says that Llao saw the beautiful daughter of a Klamath chief, and offered her immortality if she would be his consort. Furious at her refusal, Llao emerged from Mazama and spewed fire around the mountain, while Skell stood on Mount Shasta trying to defend the people. As the earth shook and burning rock fell from the sky, two holy men sacrificed themselves to Mount Mazama's crater, and Skell was able to force Llao back into the volcano, smashing the mountain on top of him and creating a great pit. Torrential rain filled the pit to form Crater Lake, Giiwas in the Klamath language.

Native Americans have lived in the area for at least 10,000 years. At least part of the surrounding vicinity was occupied by indigenous populations when Mazama resumed activity about 8,000 years ago, following about 20,000 years of dormancy. Most evidence suggests Mazama served as a camp site, but not a permanent place of habitation. Sagebrush sandals have been discovered to the east of the mountain. The local populations faced an increasingly dry climate and intermittent eruptions. In civilizations south of Mazama, stories about the volcano's eruption have been transmitted for many generations. Native populations did not tell settlers about the area, as it was sacred to tribes throughout Oregon and northern California. Shamans forbade looking towards Crater Lake, and the Klamath people believed that just the sight of Mazama was deadly. Some Native Americans still refuse to look at the water.

During the 19th century, the Klamath leader Lalek anticipated scientific discoveries about the cataclysmic eruption. Geologists had not yet discovered the mechanism for caldera formation, but the Lalek's words were recorded by the soldier William M. Colvig in 1865, and printed in Ella Clark's Indian Legends of the Pacific Northwest.

The last major volcanic landform in the Cascade Range identified by white settlers, Mazama was first visited by non-indigenous people in the spring of 1853. Eleven miners from Yreka, California, stopped at a mercantile store in Jacksonville, Oregon owned by Isaac Skeeters, boasting about a gold mine called "Lost Cabin." Financed by a successful gold miner named John Wesley Hillman, Skeeters led a team of ten men to find the mine. On June 12, they reached Crater Lake, which Skeeters noted had the bluest water he had ever seen, suggesting they name it "Deep Blue Lake." The trip failed to find gold before running low on provisions, and the discovery was quickly forgotten.

By 1862, a separate group of Oregon prospectors led by Chauncey Nye reached Crater Lake, which he named "Blue Lake". Nye authored the first published description in the Jacksonville Oregon Sentinel. Fort Klamath was established in 1863, 7 miles (11 km) to the southeast of the current boundaries of the National Park area, serviced by a wagon road from the Rogue River Valley. On August 1, 1865, hunters wandered to the lakeshore, later returning with a party of soldiers and civilians. Sergeant Orsen Stearns climbed down into the caldera, followed by Captain F. B. Sprague, who suggested the name "Lake Majesty". A party including the newspaper editor Jim Sutton visited Crater Lake in August 1869 and landed on Wizard Island, publishing an article in the Jacksonville newspaper. Sutton suggested the new name "Crater Lake".

Mount Mazama received its English name in 1896 from William G. Steel, who founded the Mazamas climbing club at Mount Hood in 1894, named for a Native American word meaning "mountain goat", (Note: The word "mazama" also means mountain goat in Spanish.) related to an Aztec term for "small deer". Steel suggested the name to United States Geological Survey (USGS) geologist Joseph S. Diller to help promote the establishment of a national park. Steel had helped map Crater Lake in 1886 with Clarence Dutton of the USGS. The US conservation movement aided Steel's efforts to preserve the Mazama area on two scales, first with the creation of the local Cascade Range Forest Reserve in 1893, then with the recognition of Crater Lake National Park on May 22, 1902.

A few decades after its discovery, Mazama began attracting geological interest. After conducting research at Mazama during the 1880s, in 1902, the USGS geologist Joseph S. Diller published a major report on the national park. He and co-author Horace B. Patton claimed that Mazama had collapsed instead of being blown outward, the first American geologists to do so. In 1942, Howel Williams of the University of California, Berkeley mapped the volcano's dacite and andesite lava flow deposits. During the 1980s, Charles Bacon and other USGS geologists added more details about the caldera formation.

== Recreation ==
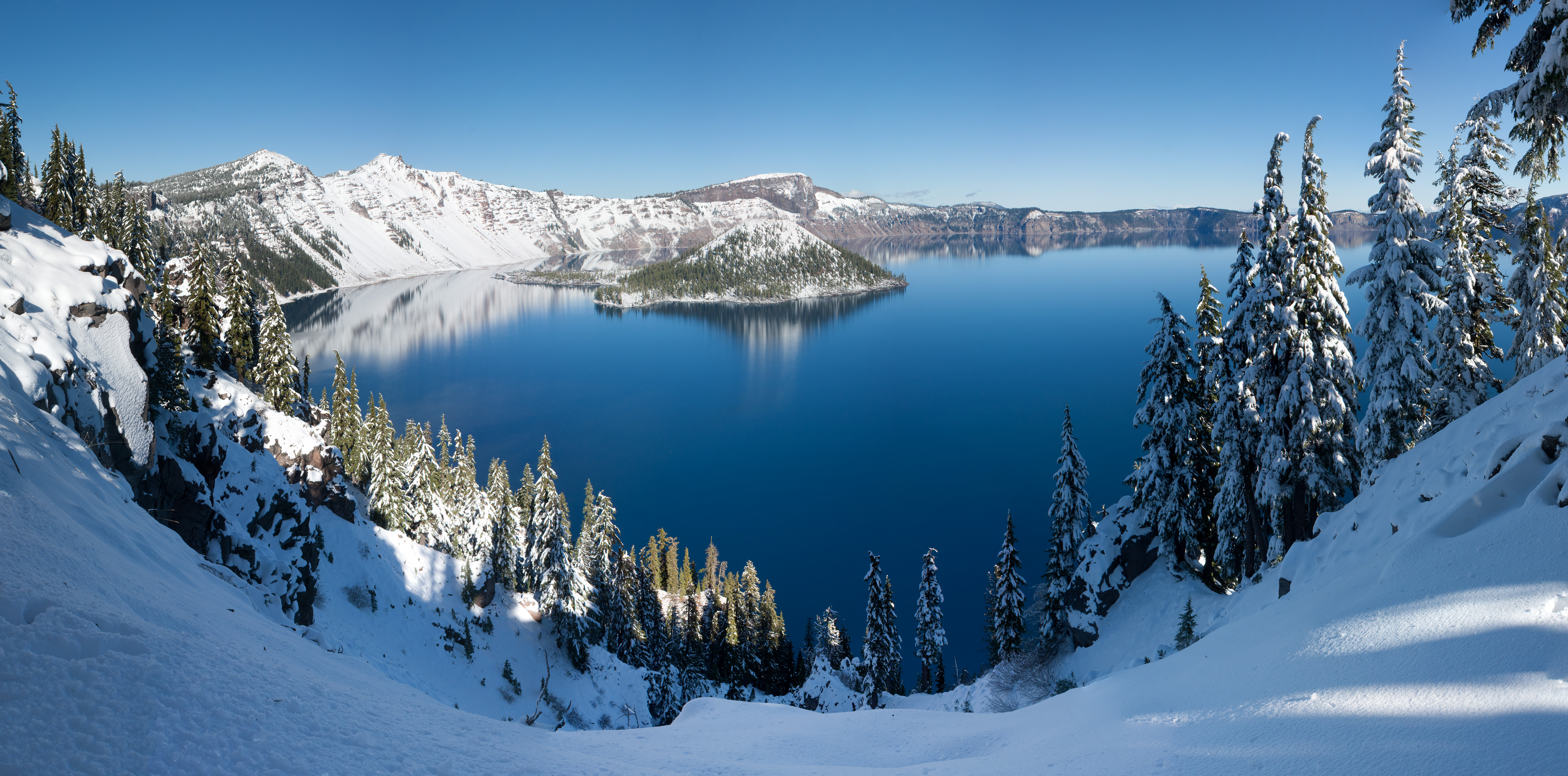
A panorama of Crater Lake during the winter season from Rim Village

Located 56 miles (90 km) north of the city of Klamath Falls and 62 miles (100 km) northeast of Medford, Crater Lake can be reached from U.S. Route 97 on the east, on the southwest by Highway 62, and on the northwest by Highway 138. Crater Lake and the remnants of Mount Mazama can be seen from Rim Drive, a 33-mile (53 km) road that surrounds the caldera, which is the only part within the Crater Lake National Park where vehicles are permitted. The Garfield Peak Trail, which runs 1.5 miles (2.4 km) east from the Crater Lake Lodge, offers views from 1,900 feet (580 m) above the lake's surface, with Mount Shasta visible 125 miles (201 km) southward. Another trail runs for 2.5 miles (4.0 km) from Rim Drive's eastern edge to Mount Scott, which offers views of central and southern Oregon such as the Three Sisters 80 miles (130 km) north of Mazama and Mount Thielsen, also to the north. The Cleetwood trail leads for 1 mile (1.6 km) down the northern flank of the caldera rim, eventually reaching Cleetwood Cove where boat trips run from late June or early July throughout the summer season to Wizard Island. Wizard Island can be climbed, offering views of Crater Lake.

Because Mount Mazama lies within a national park area, collecting rocks within the vicinity is prohibited unless a permit is obtained. The park's facilities lie at Rim Village, at the southern edge of the caldera. Lodging and camping facilities open during the summer season between May and October. No lodges, gas stations, or camping areas remain open from October through late May. Popular activities within Crater Lake National Park include biking, fishing, cross-country skiing, and snowshoeing.

== List of vents ==
- Mount Mazama
- Mount Scott (Klamath County, Oregon)
- Hillman Peak
- Applegate Peak
- Garfield Peak (Oregon)
- Wizard Island
- Merriam Cone
- Union Peak
- Williams Crater (Forgotten Crater)
- Grouse Hill
- Red Cone
- Desert Cone
- Bald Crater
- Maklaks Crater (Diller Cone)
- Cleetwood Cove
- Sentinel Rock (Oregon)
- Dutton Cliff
- Timber Crater
- Merriam Point
- Sharp Peak (Oregon)
- Bear Butte (Oregon)
- Scout Hill
- Pothole Butte
- Lookout Butte
- Crater Peak (Oregon)
- Goose Nest (Oregon)
- Goose Egg (Oregon)
- Scoria Cone (Oregon)
- Munson Point
- Arant Point

== See also ==
- Volcanic Legacy Scenic Byway
