= Garfield Peak (Oregon) =

Mountain peak in Oregon, United States

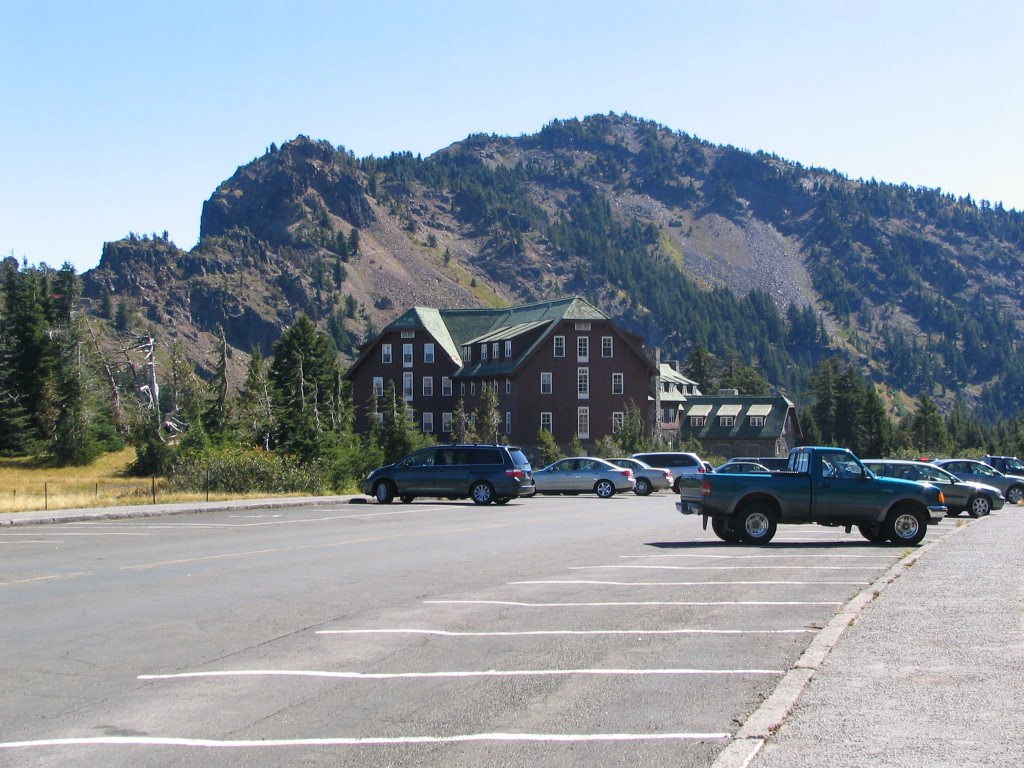
- Crater Lake Lodge and Garfield Peak in the background

Highest point
- Elevation: 7,976 ft (2,431 m)
- Prominence: 334 ft (102 m)
- Coordinates: 42°54′14″N 122°07′24″W

Geography
- Location: Klamath County, Oregon, U.S.
- Parent range: Cascades
- Topo map: USGS Crater Lake West

Geology
- Volcanic arc: Cascade Volcanic Arc

Climbing
- Easiest route: Trail from Crater Lake Lodge

Garfield Peak is a mountain peak on the south end of Crater Lake in Crater Lake National Park, Oregon. The top of the peak reaches 7,976 feet (2,431 m) above sea level. The peak has a 1,000 feet (305 m) elevation trail to the summit from the Crater Lake lodge, one of the most popular hiking sites surrounding the lake. The 1.7-mile (2.7-kilometre) trail continues east toward Applegate Peak (8,126 feet (2,477 m) high). The peak is one of seven peaks on Crater Lake's rim to rise above 8,000 feet (2,438 m).

== History ==
The Garfield Peak was named in honor of James Rudolph Garfield, the Secretary of Interior for President Theodore Roosevelt, who created the national park in 1902. Garfield visited the park in 1907, the first cabinet member to visit Crater Lake.

== Geology ==
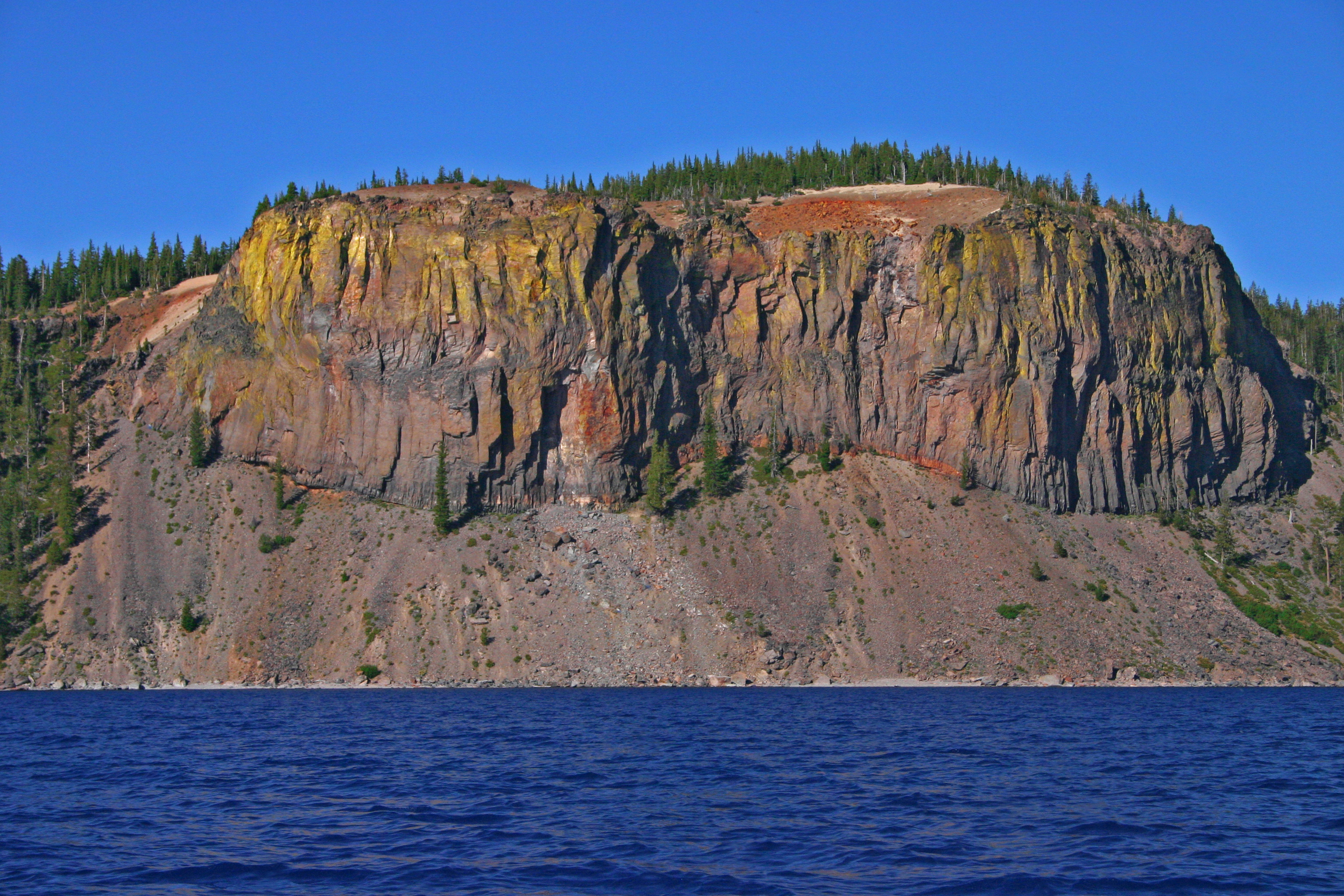
Crater Lake lichen wall

Garfield Peak was created after Mount Mazama, a large stratovolcano, erupted violently approximately 7,700 years ago, formed on the rim of its caldera which now contains Crater Lake. The walls along the southern rim of Crater Lake have had a peculiar influence from sulfur steams coming off fumaroles, which color the rock especially on Garfield Peak, the Eagle Crags and Applegate trail. The rock color frequently changes from shades of red, brown, to yellow. The reds and browns of the igneous rocks tend to be a result of the initial stages of rock decay and the inevitable pigments made by a long-standing combination of oxygen, iron, and water.

This combination of iron oxide with water forms a resulting chemical compound called mineral limonite, which has a brown color. When the iron oxide combines with more diluted amounts of water, the resulting color is yellow. In the cases where no water has entered into the reaction, the color of the resulting rock is red, forming the mineral hematite. In some areas, soluble and insoluble iron compounds mix with each other producing a greenish color rock. All these colors of rock with varying shades based on various stages of dilution can be seen on Garfield Peak, including its trailside.

== Flora and fauna ==
Garfield Peak is covered by mountain hemlock and Shasta red fir, while whitebark pine and subalpine fir can be found at higher altitudes towards the summit. American pikas and yellow-bellied marmots can be found upon the rocky slopes along the trail.

=== Birds ===
Birds and bird songs are prominent on Garfield Peak. The song of Thurber's Junco is of interest, which tends to breed on the mountains of southern Oregon. The bird resembles the Oregon Junco with head, throat and breast of deep black but with longer wings and tail and the sides of the bird are more buff than pink. They can be seen perched and singing or females can be seen hopping through the rocks and grassy meadows in search of insects and seeds. Their nest can be seen hidden under the leaves of the trailing black currant.

== Garfield Peak trail ==
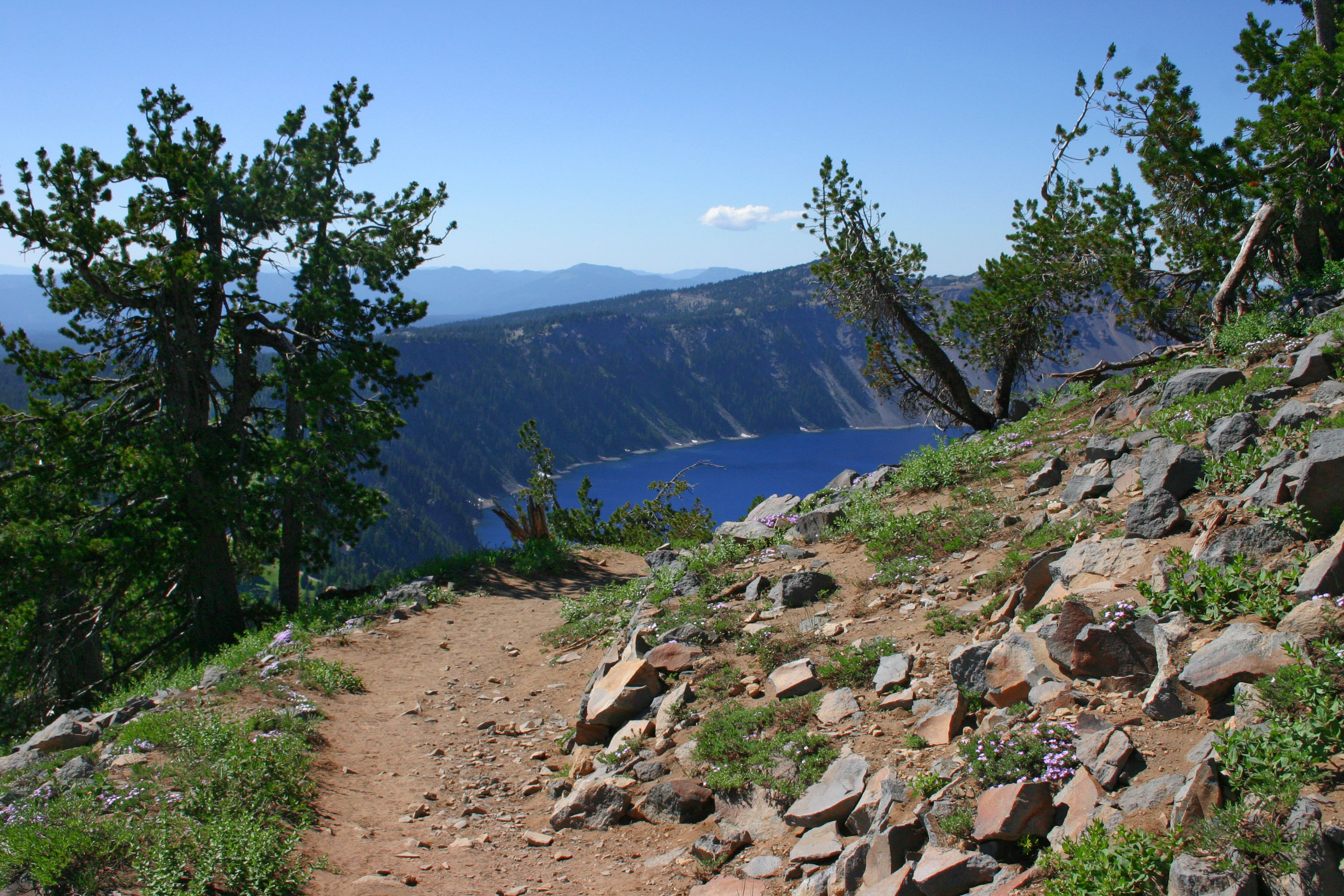
Part of Garfield Peak trail viewing north towards the western rim of Crater Lake

The Garfield Peak trail is a hiking route that travels over or parallels the westernmost stretch of the southern rim of Crater Lake. Most of the northern ridges of the trail has views of the lake and its two islands. The trail is non-paved and runs 1.7 miles (2.7 km) from the Crater Lake Lodge up a moderate rated ascension gain of 1,122 feet (342 metres) of elevation up to Garfield Peak. From Garfield Peak the trail has access to continue to a relative plain section of Crater Lake southernmost ridge past Eagle Crags towards Applegate Peak.

The trailhead is well marked on the eastern side of Crater Lake Lodge and begins with a section of paved corridors that have viewing access to the lake. The pavement transitions to an exposed but well maintained dirt trail leading northeastward. Approximately half a mile from the trailhead the track turns northward ascending the northwestern ridge of Garfield Peak. The trail slowly turns fully eastward over the northernmost ridge of Garfield Peak up to the summit.
