= Mazama Ash =

Recent (7.6kya) deposit of volcanic ash in North America

- Stratigraphic range: Holocene
- Type: Member
- Unit of: Mount Mazama Formation
- Sub-units: Tsoyawata Bed, Mazama Bed

Location
- Region: Northern North America
- Country: United States, Canada, Greenland

Type section
- Named for: Mount Mazama
- Named by: B.N. Moore, 1934

The Mazama Ash (formally named the Mazama Member in some areas) is an extensive, geologically recent deposit of volcanic ash that is present throughout much of northern North America. The ash was ejected from Mount Mazama, a volcano in south-central Oregon, during its climactic eruption about 7640 ± 20 years ago when Crater Lake was formed by caldera collapse. The ash spread primarily to the north and east due to the prevailing winds, and remnants of the ash have been identified as far northeast as the Greenland ice sheet.

Because it was deposited throughout a wide area at a known time, the Mazama Ash is an important marker bed for paleoclimatology, paleoecology, and archaeology, as well as for Quaternary geology and stratigraphic correlation.

The ash particles and gasses from the Mazama eruption would have caused climate cooling for a period of several years after the eruption. Throughout the northern Great Plains, the ash would have darkened the sky, and a layer of ash at least several centimeters thick would have blanketed much of the landscape, causing severe disruptions for the native people and wildlife.

== Age ==
The climactic eruption of Mount Mazama during which the Mazama Ash was ejected occurred approximately 6790 ± 15 ^{14}C yrs BP, or 7640 ± 20 calibrated years Before Present (5677 ± 150 B.C.E.), based on analysis of multiple ash and tephra sources throughout the Pacific Northwest, as well as by other methods such as identification of ash from within an ice core from the Greenland Ice Sheet Project, from sediment cores from the Lake Superior basin, and by radiocarbon dating of wood charred by ashflows.

== Distribution ==
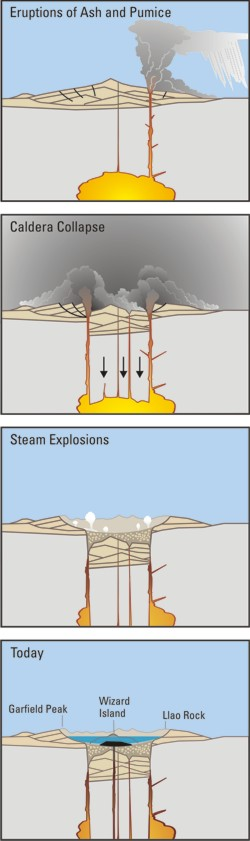
Mount Mazama's eruption timeline, showing ejection of ash and caldera collapse

The Mazama ash spread over an area of at least 900,000 km^{2} (350,000 sq mi) in the northern Great Plains, where it is most commonly preserved within peat, alluvial, lacustrine, and aeolian sediments.

In the U.S., it is present in portions of the U.S. states of California, Oregon, Washington, Idaho, Montana, Nevada, Wyoming and Utah.

It is also present in the Greenland ice sheet, and in marine sediments off the coast of Oregon, Washington, and southernmost British Columbia.

In Canada, deposits of Mazama Ash several centimeters thick are commonly present in southern areas of British Columbia, Alberta, and Saskatchewan. In southern Alberta, about 1000 kilometers (about 600 miles) northeast of the eruption site, the Mazama Ash is typically found as a white band located several metres below the present ground surface. Shards of volcanic glass from the Mazama Ash have also been identified in the sediments of Lake Superior and in a bog in Newfoundland.

Mazama Ash is the most widely distributed tephra layer from the late Quaternary in the United States and southwestern Canada, extending to eight states to the west and three Canadian provinces.

== Composition and identification ==
Like the Glacier Peak Ash deposits, Mazama Ash is well preserved in the Pacific Northwest. It is distinguishable from the lump pumice deposits ejected from the Glacier Peak volcano, which contain more phenocrysts. Mazama Ash also has more soda, yttrium, ytterbium, and zirconium, and less silica and lime than eruptive products from Glacier Peak, and it forms finer deposits than Glacier Peak Ash. The Mazama ash includes plagioclase, hypersthene, magnetite, hornblende, clinopyroxene, and volcanic glass. It can be distinguished from other volcanic ash deposits, such as those from eruptions of Glacier Peak, Mount St. Helens and Mount Rainier, by the unique chemistry of those constituents. This can be determined by electron microprobe analysis, by the refractive index of the volcanic glass, and by neutron activation analysis and similar techniques. Radiocarbon dating of associated carbon-bearing material may also aid identification of the Mazama Ash. It forms orange colored deposits.

== Impact ==
Comparison with the effects of the Mount St. Helens eruption of 1980 indicates that the Mazama Ash would have covered the landscape in a blanket up to 15 cm (6 in) thick, coating vegetation and clogging watercourses throughout the ashfall area. This would have caused an immediate scarcity of resources for the native people and wildlife, necessitating the movement of people out of the main ashfall area. Available archeological evidence from a site in the Cypress Hills of southern Alberta suggests a hiatus in human occupation of the ash-affected area there of perhaps 200 years.

The particles and gasses released during the Mazama eruption caused climate cooling. Studies of the Greenland ice core suggest that the eruption produced a substantial stratospheric aerosol loading spread over a period about six years. This may have produced a temperature depression of about 0.6 to 0.7 °C at mid- to high northern latitudes for one to three years. The release of chlorine during the eruption may also have led to substantial depletion of stratospheric ozone.

== See also ==
- Crater Lake

== Sources ==
- Fryxwell, R. (March 12, 1965). "Mazama and Glacier Peak Volcanic Ash Layers: Relative Ages". Science. 147 (3663): 1288–1290. Bibcode:1965Sci...147.1288F. doi:10.1126/science.147.3663.1288. PMID 17790824. S2CID 36995938.
- Harris, S. L. (2005). Fire Mountains of the West: The Cascade and Mono Lake Volcanoes (3rd ed.). Mountain Press Publishing Company. ISBN 978-0878425112.
- Harris, A. G.; Tuttle, E.; Tuttle, S. D. (2004). Geology of National Parks (6th ed.). Kendall/Hunt Publishing. ISBN 978-0787299712.
- Powers, H. A.; Wilcox, R. E. (June 12, 1964). "Volcanic Ash from Mount Mazama (Crater Lake) and from Glacier Peak". Science. 144 (3624): 1334–1336. Bibcode:1964Sci...144.1334P. doi:10.1126/science.144.3624.1334. PMID 17808195. S2CID 37249361.
