= Copeland Creek (Rogue River tributary) =

Water stream

Coordinates: 42.9881801°N 122.3942038°W

Copeland Creek is a stream in the U.S. state of Oregon. It is a tributary of the Rogue River. Headwaters originate west of Hillman Peak.

Copeland Creek was named after one Hiram Copeland.
