= John Wesley Hillman =

Discoverer of Crater Lake

Photograph of plaque honoring John Wesley Hillman's discovery of Crater Lake in Oregon.

John Wesley Hillman (March 29, 1832 – March 19, 1915) was an American prospector during the California Gold Rush and explorer who was among the first European Americans to see Crater Lake in the U.S. state of Oregon.

== Biography ==
Hillman was born in Albany, New York. In 1848, at the age of 16, he moved with his family to New Orleans, Louisiana. Not long after relocating to New Orleans, Hillman accompanied his father on an expedition to California during the Gold Rush in April 1849, and stayed out west when his father returned to the east. On June 12, 1853, John Wesley Hillman was reportedly the first European American to see what he named "Deep Blue Lake" in Oregon. The lake was subsequently renamed Crater Lake. Hillman shattered a knee in 1855 during the Rogue River Wars and returned east a few years later, settling to a farming life in Baton Rouge, Louisiana.

Hillman's first marriage, in April 1866, was to his cousin Elizabeth Hillman (July 24, 1843 – June 1873). He had one daughter by this marriage who died as a child in 1874. His second marriage, in Orleans parish on July 25, 1875, was to Rosalie Frye (October 11, 1854 – May 4, 1928). By his second marriage he had four recorded children of whom two - one son and one daughter - survived to adulthood.

He died in Hope Villa, Ascension Parish, Louisiana on March 19, 1915.

Hillman is the namesake of Hillman Peak in Crater Lake National Park.
