= Applegate Peak =

Mountain peak in Oregon

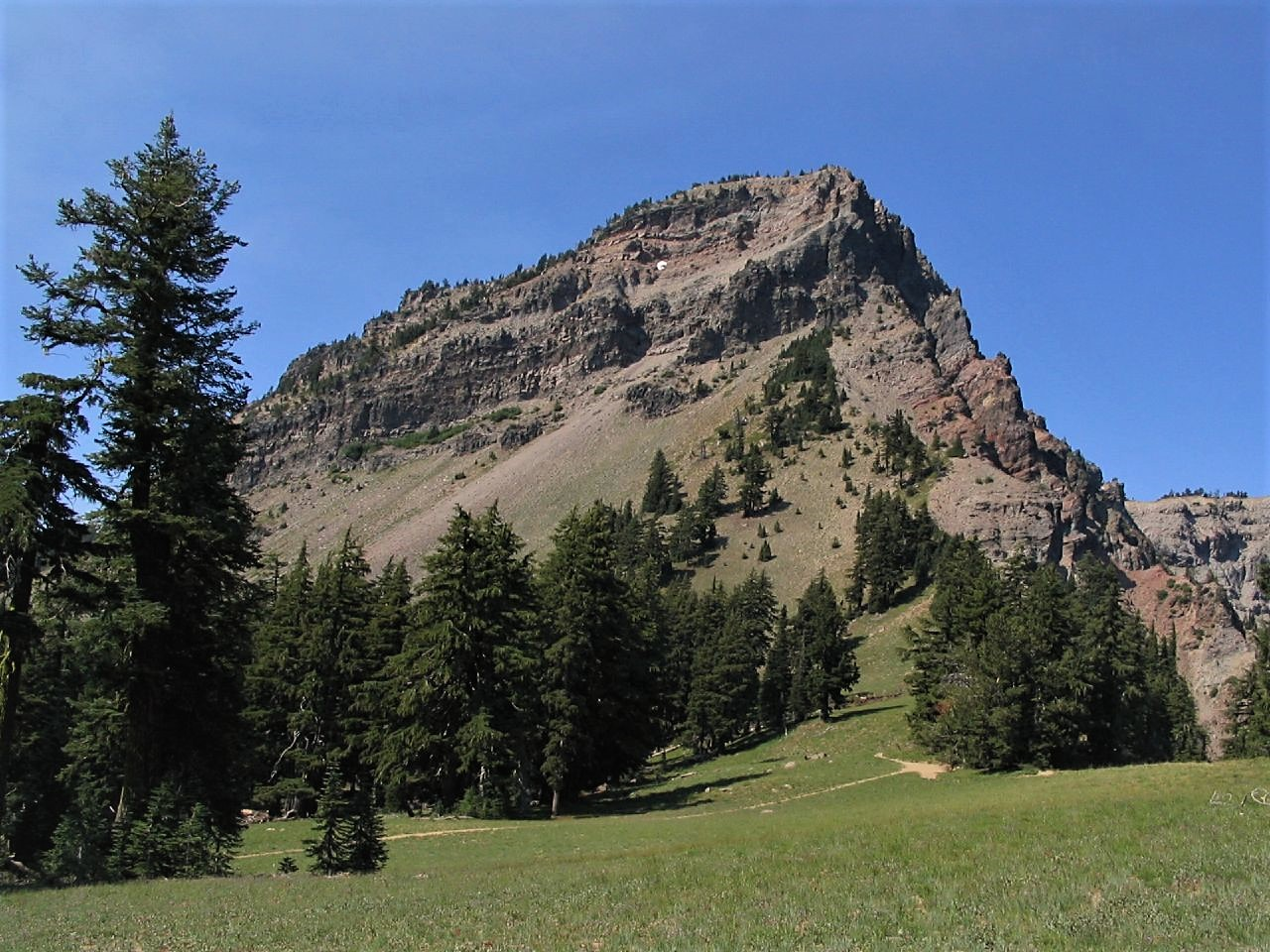
- East aspect, from Sun Notch

Highest point
- Elevation: 8,126 ft (2,477 m)
- Prominence: 1,022 ft (312 m)
- Parent peak: Dutton Ridge (8,147 ft)
- Isolation: 1.06 mi (1.71 km)
- Coordinates: 42°53′59″N 122°06′18″W

Naming
- Etymology: Oliver Cromwell Applegate

Geography
- Location within Oregon Location within the United States
- Country: United States of America
- State: Oregon
- County: Klamath
- Protected area: Crater Lake National Park
- Parent range: Cascades
- Topo map: USGS Crater Lake East

Geology
- Rock age: Pleistocene
- Rock type(s): andesite, dacite, breccia
- Volcanic arc: Cascade Volcanic Arc

Climbing
- Easiest route: class 2 hiking

Applegate Peak is an 8,126 feet (2,477 m) summit on the south rim of Crater Lake in Crater Lake National Park, Oregon. It ranks as the fourth-highest peak in the park. Topographic relief is significant as the summit rises 1,950 feet above the lake in 0.37 mile. Rim Drive traverses the eastern base of the peak. Precipitation runoff from the mountain's north slope drains into Crater Lake whereas the south slope drains to Wood River via Sun and Annie creeks.

== History ==
Applegate Peak was named in the 1800s for Captain Oliver Cromwell Applegate (1845–1938), an early pioneer of Klamath Falls. In August 1872, Oliver Applegate, Lord William Maxwell, John Meacham, Chester Sawtelle, and A. Bentley succeeded in placing a boat in Crater Lake and taking the first extended excursion around the lake at which time they named prominent landforms after themselves. The peak's toponym was officially adopted February 4, 1931, by the United States Board on Geographic Names. On August 6, 1948, George M. Roest (age 18) a park concessioner’s employee, fell to his death while climbing alone on Applegate Peak.

== Climate ==
Based on the Köppen climate classification, Applegate Peak has a subalpine climate. Most weather fronts originate in the Pacific Ocean, and travel east toward the Cascades where they are forced upward by the range (Orographic lift), causing them to drop their moisture in the form of rain or snowfall. As a result, the Cascades experience high precipitation, especially during the winter months in the form of snowfall. Winter temperatures can drop below 10 °F (−12 °C) with wind chill factors below 0 °F (−18 °C). In the Crater Lake area, winter lasts eight months with an average snowfall of 41 feet (12.5 m) per year. Rim Drive is only open during the summer due to the heavy snowfall as the road is covered by more than 20 feet (6.1 m) of snow with drifts as deep as 60 feet (18 m) in some areas. During winter months, weather is usually cloudy, but due to high pressure systems over the Pacific Ocean that intensify during summer months, there is often little or no cloud cover during the summer.

== Geology ==
Applegate Peak was created when Mount Mazama, a large stratovolcano erupted violently approximately 7,700 years ago and formed on the caldera rim. The peak is composed of lava flows containing andesite, dacite, and breccias.

== See also ==
- Geology of the Pacific Northwest

== Gallery ==
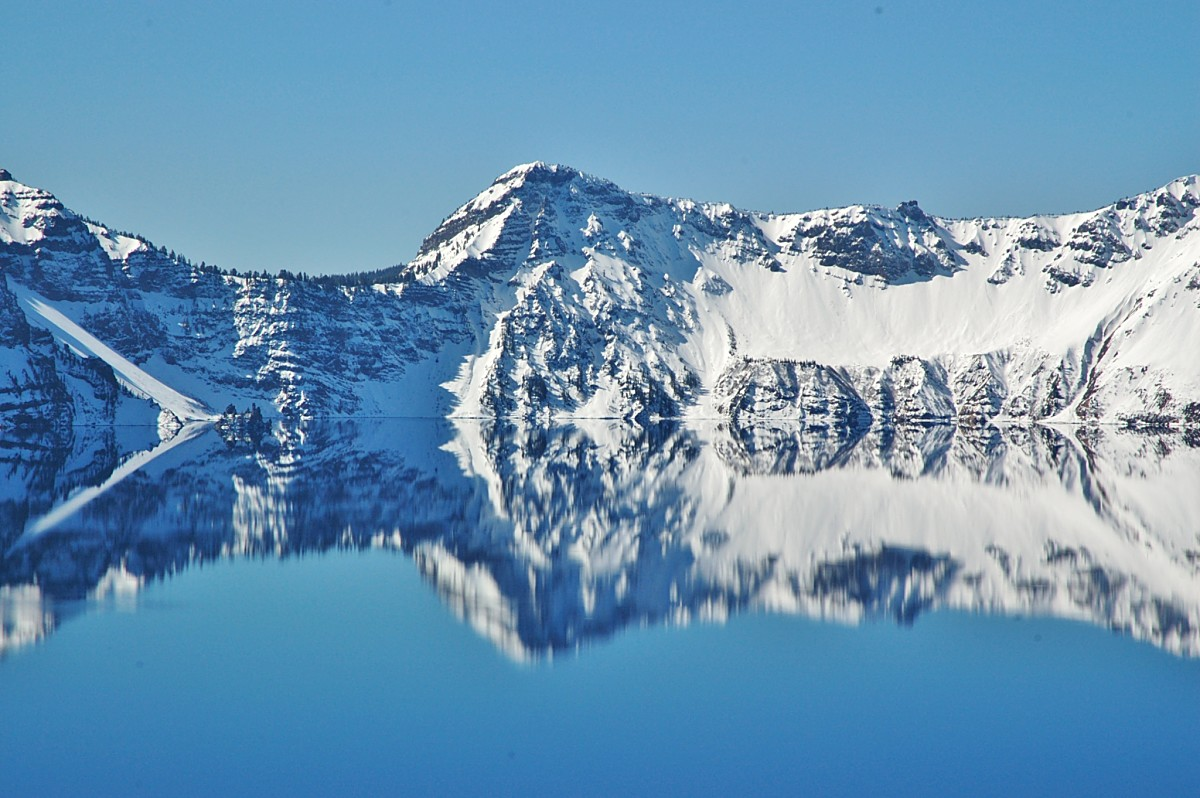
North aspect of Applegate reflected in Crater Lake.

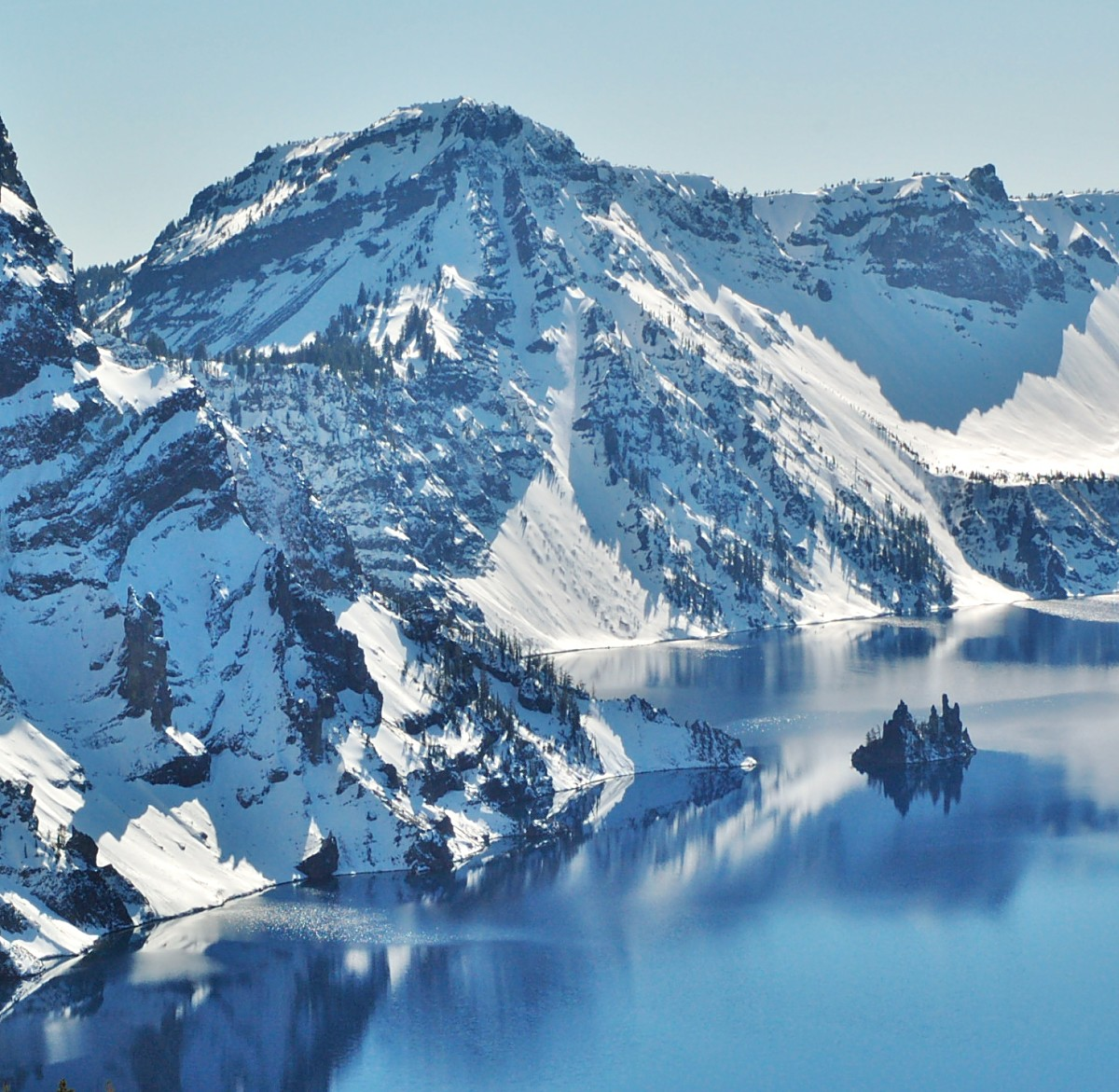
Northeast aspect of Applegate seen with Phantom Ship

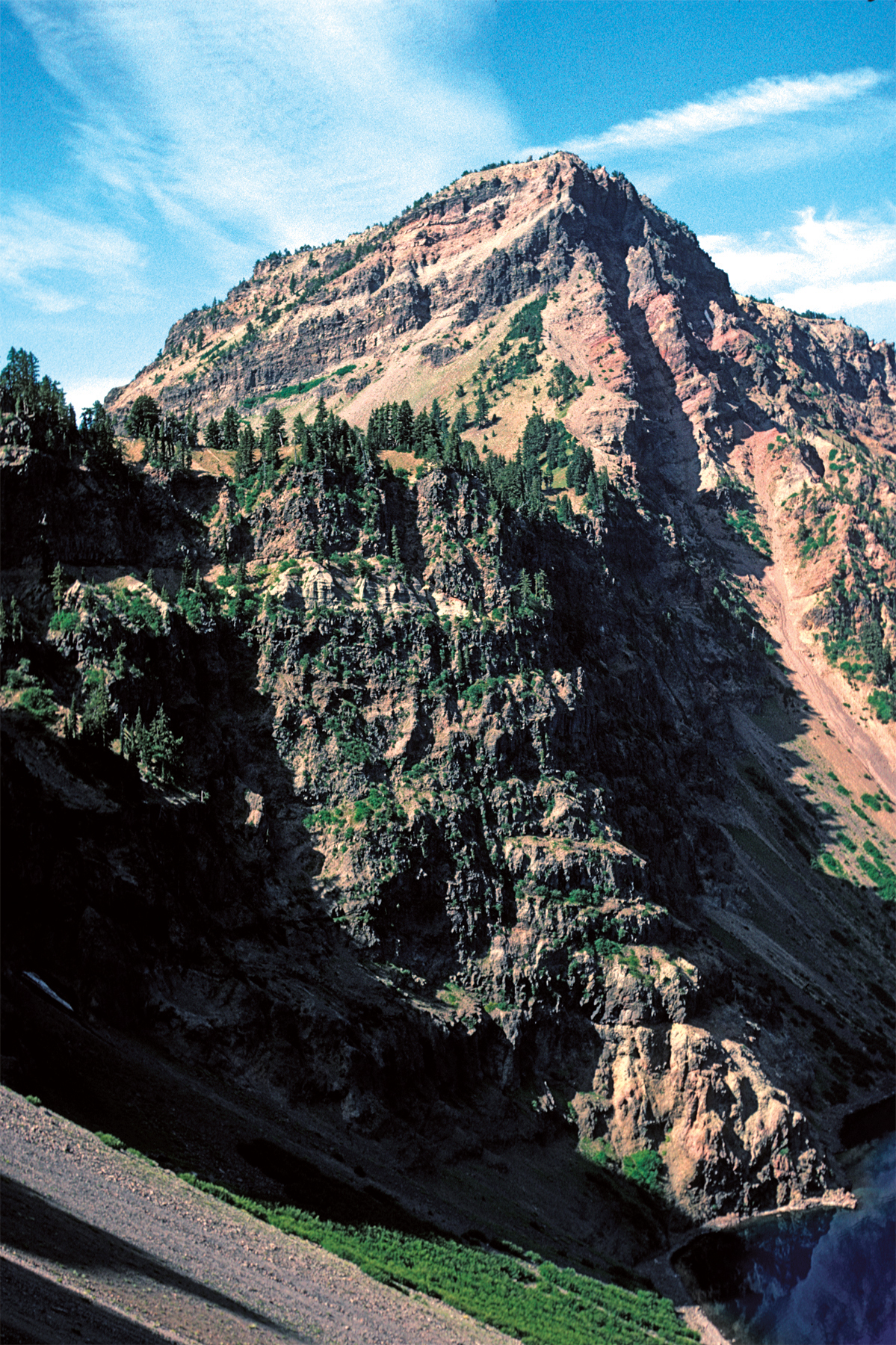
Northeast aspect

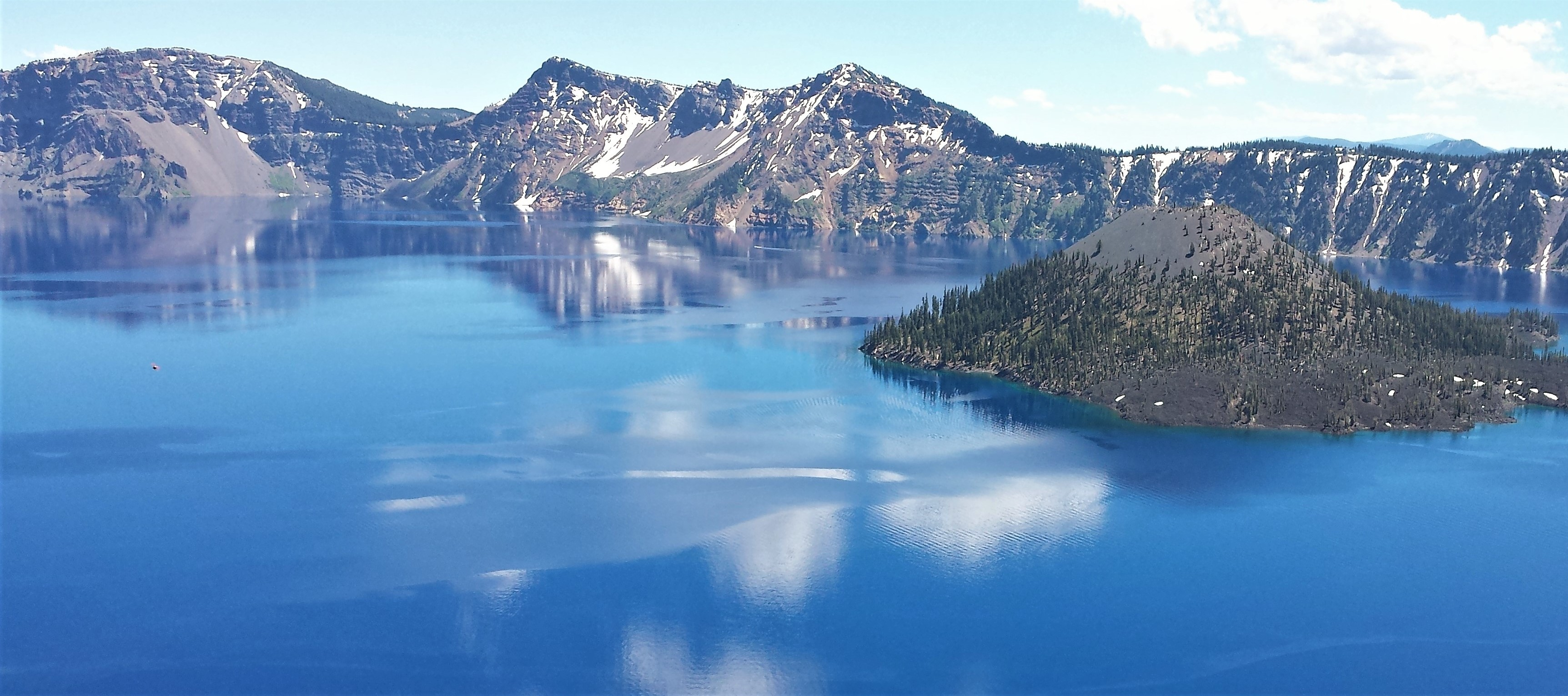
L→Rː Dutton Cliff, Appegate Peak, Garfield Peak, Wizard Island

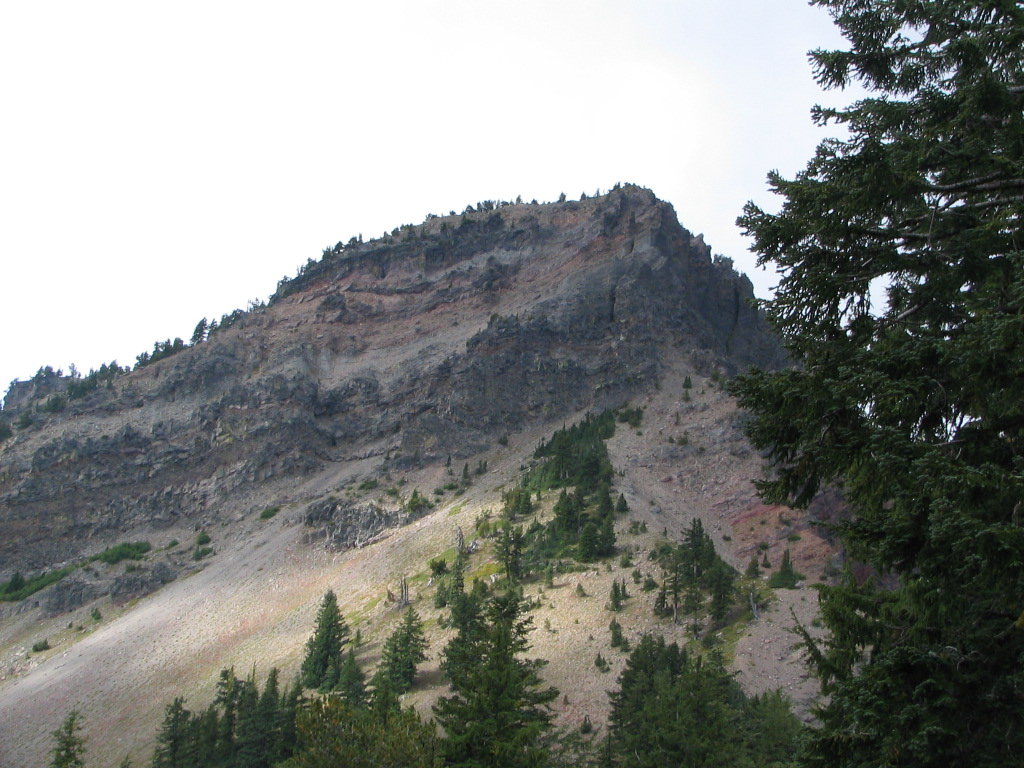
East aspect from Sun Notch
