= Rim Drive =

Scenic highway around Crater Lake National Park

- Rim Drive Historic District
- U.S. National Register of Historic Places
- U.S. Historic district
- Location within Oregon Location within the United States
- Location: Crater Lake National Park
- Nearest city: Klamath Falls, Oregon, USA
- Coordinates: 42°54′45″N 122°08′57″W
- Built: 1926-1941
- Architect: John Sargent, Francis Lange, et al.
- NRHP reference No.: 08000041
- Added to NRHP: 2008

Rim Drive is a scenic highway in Crater Lake National Park in southern Oregon, United States. It is a 33-mile (53 km) loop that follows the caldera rim around Crater Lake. Due to its unique engineering and the surrounding park landscape, the drive was listed as a historic district on the National Register of Historic Places in 2008.

== History ==
Crater Lake lies inside a caldera created 7,700 years ago when the 12,000-foot (3,700 m) high Mount Mazama collapsed following a large volcanic eruption. Over the following millennia the caldera filled with rain water forming today's lake.

In 1886, William Gladstone Steel accompanied a United States Geological Survey party led by Captain Clarence Dutton to survey Crater Lake. During the visit, Steel named many of the lake's landmarks including Wizard Island, Llao Rock, and Skell Head. The lake's natural beauty made a great impression on Steel. As a result, when he returned from the survey expedition, he began advocating that Crater Lake be established as a national park.

On 22 May 1902, President Theodore Roosevelt signed the bill making Crater Lake the Nation's sixth national park. The United States Department of the Interior was charged with developing road access and visitor services for the park. This was a difficult job because of the park's remote location at the summit of the Cascade Mountains. By 1905, a "steep and tortuous" road to the crater rim had been completed. This access road was essential for the future development of the park.

In 1913, Congress appropriated funds for the U.S. Army Corps of Engineers to construct a road around Crater Lake. The initial road survey identified the northern end of Munson Valley, three miles (4.8 km) south of the rim, as the best site for the road crew's seasonal headquarters and supply depot. Not only was Munson Valley a central location, the surrounding area provided timber for constructing support facilities. However, World War I slowed down road construction.

The road around the lake was finally finished in 1919. In July of that year, the National Park Service assumed responsibility for maintaining the new loop road known as Rim Road. The roadway was only 12 feet (3.7 m) wide and had other serious limitations including sections of road with grades as steep as ten percent. As a result, a major upgrade was needed soon after the original road was completed.

== Construction ==
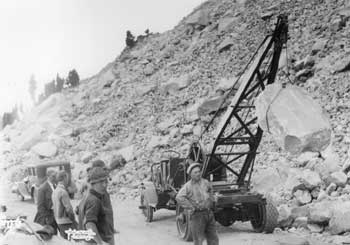
Rim Drive construction crew near Watchman Peak

The current Rim Drive is a 33-mile (53 km) loop built by the Bureau of Public Roads and the National Park Service with help from the Civilian Conservation Corps. The new road was designed to be 18 feet (5.5 m) wide with 3-foot (0.91 m) shoulders. The new route was surveyed and graded in 1931 and 1932. The road foundation was built up during the following two years. In 1935, the initial paving was completed, and the old roadbed that was not covered by the new road was dug up and the landscape restored. Lane striping was added in 1938. Work on the road drainage, stone masonry guardrails, and observation points continued until 1941. Despite the difficult topography the entire project was completed for two million dollars, a significant engineering accomplishment.

One of the main goals of the Rim Drive construction project was to blend the road into the natural environment. This was successfully accomplished. The road is built with gentle curves and there are no switchbacks despite the rugged terrain. Rustic stone guardrails were constructed along curves, at drainages, and at most of the Rim Drive viewpoints. While the observation points and turnouts provide views of the lake, the road itself cannot be seen from most of the observation points. Because of its unique history, engineering, stone masonry, associated hiking trails, and vistas of Crater Lake, Rim Drive was listed on the National Register of Historic Places on 30 January 2008. In addition, the American Automobile Association has named Rim Drive as one of the "ten most beautiful roads in the United States".

== Route ==
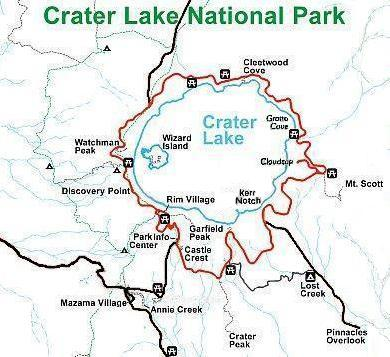
Rim Drive is a 33-mile (53 km) loop road around Crater Lake

Rim Drive is located high in the Cascade Mountains. At its lowest point, Rim Drive is 6,500 feet (2,000 m) above sea level. The road reaches almost 7,900 feet (2,400 m) at its highest point on top of Cloudcap. Rim Drive has eight main viewing areas with roadside parking. Four of these observation points (Pumice Point, Skell Head, Cloudcap, and Kerr Notch) are located just off the road. Short trails from parking areas lead to the other four observation points (Sinnott Memorial, Discovery Point, Watchman Lookout, and Merriam Point). In addition to the main viewing areas, there are 15 turnout vista points along the road.

Heading northwest from the Crater Lake National Park headquarters in the Munson Valley Historic District, it is three miles (4.8 km) to Crater Lake rim and the Rim Village visitor area which is also a historic district. The Sinnott Memorial overlook is located in Rim Village. Leaving Rim Village, the speed limit is reduced to 35 miles per hour (56 km/h). Visitors reach the Discovery Point viewing area in just over one mile (1.6 km). From there, it is five miles (8.0 km) to the junction with the North Entrance Road. Between these two way points visitors pass over the 7,350 feet (2,240 m) West Rim Summit. The section of Rim Drive between Rim Village and the North Entrance Road is known as West Rim Drive. This part of the road is used heavily during the summer because it is the direct route between the park's north and south entrances and passes by the Rim Village visitor area and the park headquarters at Munson Valley. It also offers classic views of Crater Lake and Wizard Island along the way.

Continuing north on Rim Drive past the North Entrance Road junction, visitors traverse the back side of Llao Rock. This is the beginning of East Rim Drive. The next turnout for viewing the lake is approximately two miles beyond the North Entrance Road junction. Viewpoints along East Rim Drive are generally not crowded except at the Cleetwood Cove parking area which is at the north end of Crater Lake. Cleetwood Cove is the trailhead for the only hiking trail down into the crater. The National Park Service maintains a marina for boat tours at Cleetwood Cove.

Beyond Cleetwood Cove, on East Rim Drive there are a series of seven turnout-parking vista points. These turnouts retain almost all of their original stone masonry and have views of Crater Lake. The first of these view points is located above Grotto Cove, about halfway around the lake from Rim Village. The next viewing area is Skell Head, about a half mile from Grotto Cove. The next five vista points are spread over the approximately seven miles. These stops are Cloudcap, Cottage Rocks, Sentinel Point, Reflection Point, and Kerr Notch. Each site has views of the lake and surrounding landscape include Mount Scott.

Kerr Notch, located 21 miles (34 km) from Rim Village, is the last observation point on the Rim Drive loop with a view of the lake. After leaving Kerr Notch the road cuts across the east face of Dutton Ridge offering a view of the Klamath Basin from near the East Rim Summit. Rim Drive then descends to the Sun Notch trailhead where visitors can hike to another viewpoint overlooking the lake. Rim Drive continues along the outer edge of Sun Meadow to a parking area in front of Vidae Falls, a 100-foot (30 m) cascade. Vidae Falls has a picnic area and a trailhead to a cinder cone called Crater Peak.

The final two miles (3.2 km) of Rim Drive passes by the Castle Crest Wildflower Garden. The half mile long Castle Crest Nature Trail takes visitor through a wetland wildflower meadow. The wildflower display is at its peak in July and August. Rim Drive terminates a half mile from the Castle Crest parking area, at the Munson Valley Road junction near the park headquarters and visitor center.

== Access ==
Rim Drive has two access points. The south access begins at the park headquarters in the Munson Valley Historic District sixty miles north of Klamath Falls, Oregon. The road to Munson Valley is open year-around. However, snowfall in the park is heavy and winter storms make driving in the Crater Lake area unpredictable.

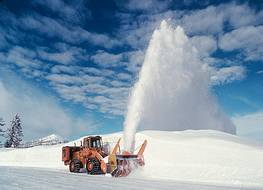
Snowblower clearing Rim Drive for July opening

The park's north entrance is nine miles (14 km) north of the Rim Drive junction across an area known as the Pumice Desert. From the north entrance, it is 119-mile (192 km) to Bend, Oregon. The North Entrance Road is closed in the fall and does not re-open until the following summer.

In the Crater Lake area, winter lasts eight months with an average snowfall of 533 inches (1,350 cm) per year, and many snow banks remain well into the summer. While the park headquarters and visitor center at Munson Valley and the Rim Village cafeteria are open year-around, Rim Drive is only open during the summer due to the heavy snowfall. In most places, the road is covered by more than 20 feet (6.1 m) of snow with drifts as deep as 60 feet (18 m) in some areas. Sensors buried in the roadway help snow removal crews locate the center of the road under the accumulated snow.

During the summer, the National Park Service charges a $30 fee for private passenger vehicles entering the park. In non summer months the fee is $15 for private passenger vehicles. Commercial vehicles are charged between $25 and $200 depending on the vehicle's capacity.
