= Crater Lake National Park =

National park in Oregon

- IUCN category II (national park)
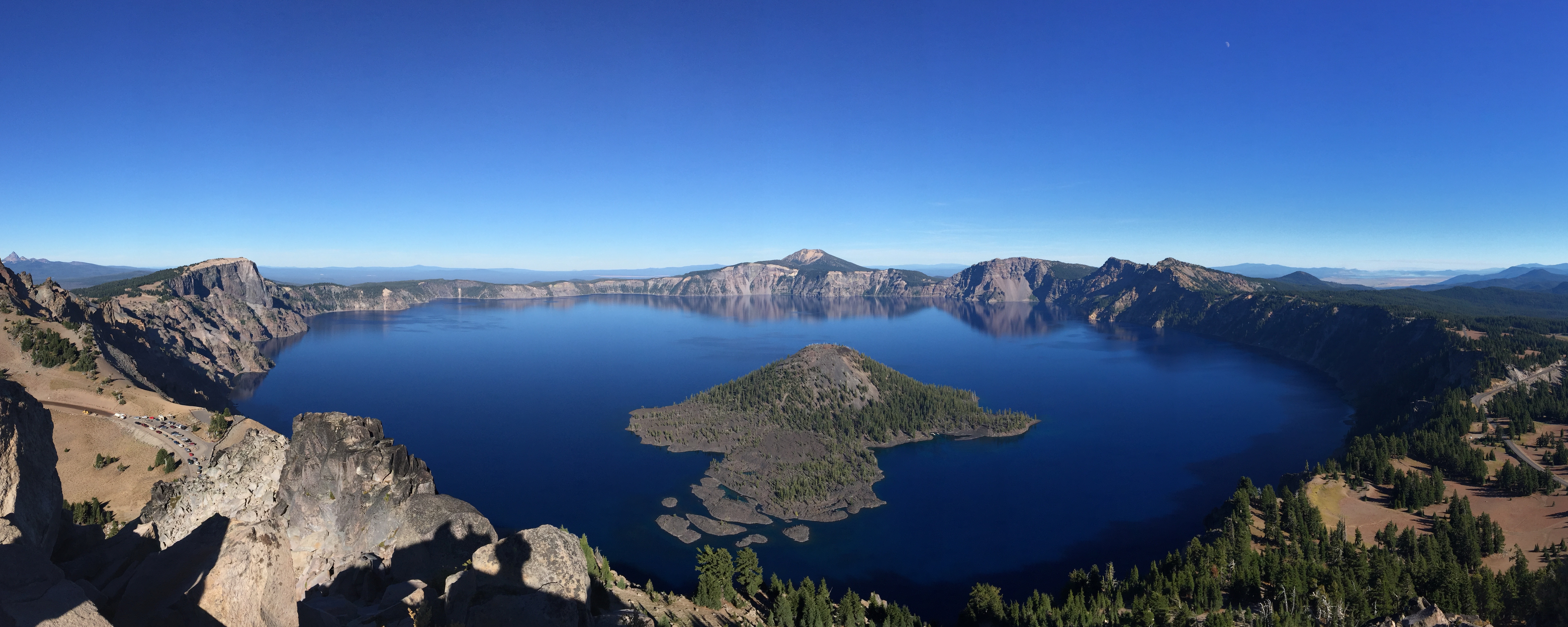
- Panoramic view of Crater Lake
- Interactive map of Crater Lake National Park
- Location: Klamath County, Oregon, United States
- Nearest city: Klamath Falls
- Coordinates: 42°54′40″N 122°8′52″W
- Area: 183,224 acres (741.48 km^{2})
- Established: May 22, 1902; 124 years ago
- Visitors: 527,000 (in 2022)
- Governing body: National Park Service
- Website: nps.gov/crla

Crater Lake National Park is a national park of the United States located in southern Oregon. Established in 1902, Crater Lake is the fifth-oldest national park in the United States and the only national park in Oregon. The park protects the flanks and caldera of Crater Lake, a remnant of Mount Mazama, a destroyed volcano, and the surrounding hills and forests.

The lake is 1,949 feet (594 m) deep at its deepest point, which makes it the deepest lake in the United States, the second-deepest in North America and the tenth-deepest in the world. Crater Lake is often referred to as the seventh-deepest lake in the world, but this former listing excludes the approximately 3,000-foot (910 m) depth of subglacial Lake Vostok in Antarctica, which resides under nearly 13,000 feet (4,000 m) of ice, and the recent report of a 2,740-foot (840 m) maximum depth for Lake O'Higgins/San Martin, located on the border of Chile and Argentina. However, when comparing its average depth of 1,148 feet (350 m) to the average depth of other deep lakes, Crater Lake becomes the deepest in the Western Hemisphere and the third-deepest in the world. The impressive average depth of this volcanic lake is due to the nearly symmetrical 4,000-foot-deep (1,200 m) caldera formed 7,700 years ago (about 8 kya) during the violent climactic eruptions and subsequent collapse of Mount Mazama and the relatively moist climate that is typical of the crest of the Cascade Range.

The caldera rim ranges in elevation from 7,000 to 8,000 feet (2,100 to 2,400 m). The United States Geological Survey benchmark elevation of the lake surface is 6,178 feet (1,883 m). The national park encompasses 183,224 acres (74,148 ha; 286.288 sq mi; 741.48 km^{2}). Crater Lake has no streams flowing into or out of it. All water that enters the lake is eventually lost from evaporation or subsurface seepage. The lake's water commonly has a striking blue hue, and the lake is refilled entirely from direct precipitation in the form of snow and rain.

== Park purpose ==
As stated in the foundation document:

Crater Lake National Park forever preserves Crater Lake, scenic landscapes, volcanic features, and unique ecological and cultural heritage, and fosters understanding and appreciation through enjoyment, education, and inspiration.

== Geology ==
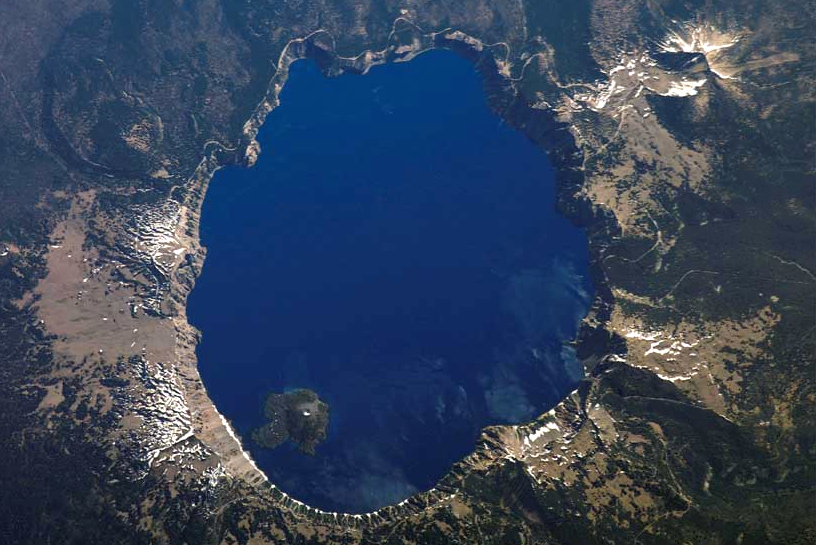
Satellite view of Crater Lake.

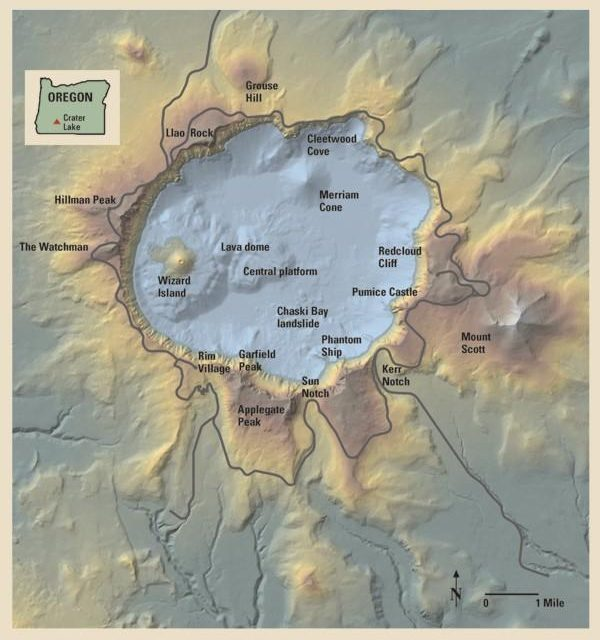
Relief map of Crater Lake area.

Volcanic activity in this area is fed by subduction off the coast of Oregon as the Juan de Fuca Plate slips below the North American Plate (see plate tectonics). Heat and compression generated by this movement has created a mountain chain topped by a series of volcanoes, which together are called the Cascade Range. The large volcanoes in the range are called the High Cascades. The range has many other volcanoes, however, most of which are much smaller.

About 400,000 years ago (400 kya), Mount Mazama began its existence in much the same way as the other mountains of the High Cascades, as overlapping shield volcanoes. Over time, alternating layers of lava flows and pyroclastic flows built Mazama's overlapping cones until it reached about 11,000 feet (3,400 m) in height.

As the young stratovolcano grew, many smaller volcanoes and volcanic vents were built in the area of the park and just outside what are now the park's borders. Chief among these were cinder cones. Although the early examples are gone, since cinder cones erode easily, the park features at least 13 much younger cinder cones, as well as at least another 11 or so outside its borders, that still retain their distinctive cinder cone appearance. Debate has continued as to whether these minor volcanoes and vents were parasitic to Mazama's magma chamber and system or whether they were related to background Oregon Cascade volcanism.

After a period of dormancy, Mazama became active again. Then, around 5700 BCE, Mazama collapsed into itself during a tremendous volcanic eruption, losing 2,500 to 3,500 feet (760 to 1,070 m) in height. The eruption formed a large caldera that, depending on the prevailing climate, was filled in about 740 years, forming Crater Lake.

The eruptive period that decapitated Mazama also laid waste to much of the greater Crater Lake area and deposited ash as far east as the northwest corner of what is now Yellowstone National Park, as far south as central Nevada, and as far north as southern British Columbia. It produced more than 150 times as much ash as the May 18, 1980 eruption of Mount St. Helens.

This ash has since developed a soil type called andisol. Soils in Crater Lake National Park are brown, dark brown or dark grayish-brown sandy loams or loamy sands which have plentiful cobbles, gravel, and stones. They are slightly to moderately acidic and their drainage is somewhat excessive.

== Climate ==
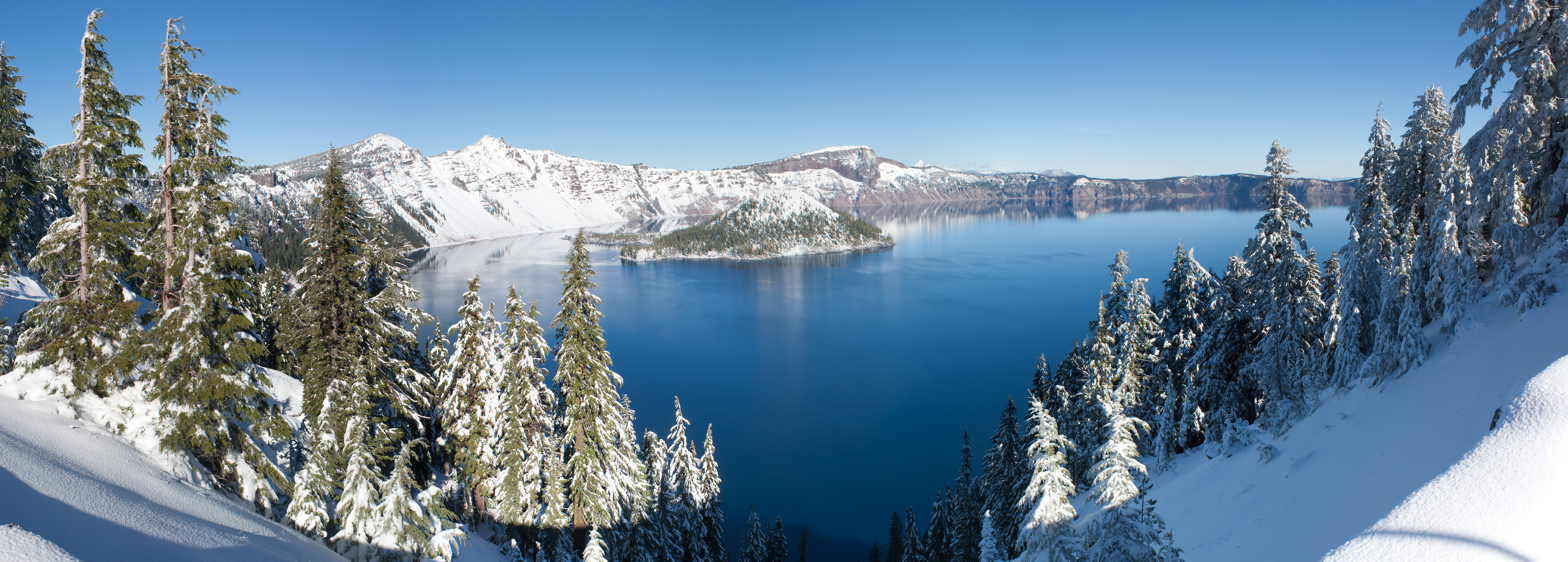
November panorama from Rim Village. During the winter, the road up to Rim Village is normally plowed but Rim Drive is closed.

According to the Köppen climate classification system, Crater Lake National Park has a dry-summer subarctic climate (Dsc). The plant hardiness zone at the lake is 6b with an average annual extreme minimum air temperature of −3.7 °F (−19.8 °C).

Snow is relatively rare at low elevations in western Oregon, but it is common at higher elevations, especially at Crater Lake. Measurements at park headquarters, 6,475 feet (1,974 m) above sea level, show that snow falls more often here than at any other long-term weather station in Oregon. Winter, which typically begins at the park in September and runs through June, includes an average of 101 days with measurable snowfall. Up to 37 in (94 cm) of snow have fallen on the park in a single day (in 1937, 1951, and 1971), 313 in (800 cm) in a month (January 1950), and 903 in (2,290 cm) in a year (1950).

Snow typically accumulates in the park to depths of 10 to 15 feet (3.0 to 4.6 m) by early spring. Most of the park's roads remain closed through late spring, and snow lingers into the summer. In July and August, snowfall is uncommon, and "one magnificent day typically follows another".

December is the coldest month, when highs average about 33 °F (1 °C) and lows average about 19 °F (−7 °C). August is the warmest month, with an average high of roughly 69 °F (21 °C) and an average low of about 42 °F (6 °C). The highest recorded temperature was 100 °F (38 °C) and the lowest was −21 °F (−29 °C). Annual precipitation averages about 67 in (1,700 mm) a year. December is the wettest, averaging about 11 in (280 mm).

Although snow covers Crater Lake National Park for eight months of the year (average annual snowfall is 463 in (1,180 cm)), the lake rarely freezes over due, in part, to a relatively mild onshore flow from the Pacific Ocean. The last recorded year in which the lake froze over was in 1949, a very long, cold winter. A 95% surface freeze occurred in 1985. The immense depth of Crater Lake acts as a heat reservoir that absorbs and traps sunlight, maintaining the lake temperature at an average of 55 °F (13 °C) on the surface and 38 °F (3 °C) at the bottom throughout the year. The surface temperature fluctuates a bit, but the bottom temperature remains quite constant.

Climate data for Crater Lake National Park Headquarters, Oregon, 1991–2020 normals, extremes 1919–present
Month	Jan	Feb	Mar	Apr	May	Jun	Jul	Aug	Sep	Oct	Nov	Dec	Year
Record high °F (°C)	64 (18)	66 (19)	67 (19)	71 (22)	80 (27)	96 (36)	100 (38)	94 (34)	93 (34)	81 (27)	71 (22)	64 (18)	100 (38)
Mean maximum °F (°C)	49.4 (9.7)	49.5 (9.7)	53.0 (11.7)	59.3 (15.2)	66.7 (19.3)	73.8 (23.2)	81.1 (27.3)	81.8 (27.7)	77.7 (25.4)	69.7 (20.9)	56.4 (13.6)	47.7 (8.7)	83.3 (28.5)
Mean daily maximum °F (°C)	33.4 (0.8)	33.6 (0.9)	36.1 (2.3)	40.3 (4.6)	49.0 (9.4)	57.0 (13.9)	68.9 (20.5)	69.3 (20.7)	63.0 (17.2)	50.7 (10.4)	38.0 (3.3)	32.7 (0.4)	47.7 (8.7)
Daily mean °F (°C)	26.6 (−3.0)	26.3 (−3.2)	28.2 (−2.1)	31.7 (−0.2)	39.2 (4.0)	45.3 (7.4)	55.1 (12.8)	55.4 (13.0)	50.1 (10.1)	40.4 (4.7)	30.6 (−0.8)	25.9 (−3.4)	37.9 (3.3)
Mean daily minimum °F (°C)	19.8 (−6.8)	18.9 (−7.3)	20.3 (−6.5)	23.1 (−4.9)	29.3 (−1.5)	33.6 (0.9)	41.4 (5.2)	41.5 (5.3)	37.1 (2.8)	30.2 (−1.0)	23.2 (−4.9)	19.1 (−7.2)	28.1 (−2.2)
Mean minimum °F (°C)	5.9 (−14.5)	5.4 (−14.8)	6.6 (−14.1)	10.3 (−12.1)	17.1 (−8.3)	24.2 (−4.3)	31.7 (−0.2)	31.4 (−0.3)	26.1 (−3.3)	17.8 (−7.9)	9.0 (−12.8)	4.2 (−15.4)	−0.7 (−18.2)
Record low °F (°C)	−21 (−29)	−18 (−28)	−7 (−22)	−3 (−19)	5 (−15)	10 (−12)	18 (−8)	16 (−9)	16 (−9)	3 (−16)	−7 (−22)	−18 (−28)	−21 (−29)
Average precipitation inches (mm)	10.10 (257)	7.53 (191)	7.81 (198)	6.16 (156)	3.65 (93)	2.27 (58)	0.80 (20)	0.83 (21)	1.93 (49)	4.80 (122)	9.60 (244)	11.28 (287)	66.76 (1,696)
Average snowfall inches (cm)	86.5 (220)	68.9 (175)	71.9 (183)	48.7 (124)	14.5 (37)	3.7 (9.4)	0.0 (0.0)	0.0 (0.0)	1.8 (4.6)	17.2 (44)	59.3 (151)	90.6 (230)	463.1 (1,178)
Average extreme snow depth inches (cm)	92.0 (234)	106.4 (270)	121.1 (308)	113.4 (288)	89.3 (227)	42.5 (108)	4.3 (11)	0.0 (0.0)	1.4 (3.6)	10.7 (27)	32.0 (81)	66.0 (168)	124.3 (316)
Average precipitation days (≥ 0.01 in)	17.9	16.7	18.0	16.5	11.5	7.4	3.5	3.7	5.3	10.6	16.7	18.4	146.2
Average snowy days (≥ 0.1 in)	16.2	14.8	15.4	13.2	5.5	1.8	0.0	0.0	0.9	4.7	12.1	16.1	100.7
Mean monthly sunshine hours	124.0	141.3	217.0	240.0	310.0	330.0	372.0	341.0	270.0	217.0	90.0	93.0	2,745.3
Percentage possible sunshine	44	45	58	62	67	73	80	79	75	64	30	33	59
Average ultraviolet index	2	2	4	6	8	9	9	8	6	4	2	1	5
Source 1: NOAA
Source 2: Weather Atlas (sunshine data, UV index)

== Fauna ==
Mammals that are residents of this national park include Canadian lynxes, bobcats, beavers, chipmunks, pronghorns, foxes, squirrels, porcupines, black bears, coyotes, pika, badgers, deer, elk, muskrats, and martens.

Birds that commonly fly through this park include raptors, along with American dippers, Peregrine falcons, ravens, Clark's nutcrackers, Canada jays, bald eagles, hummingbirds, and spotted owls, while Canada geese float on its lake.

== Park features ==
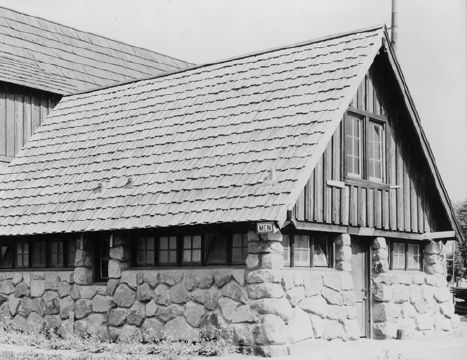
Comfort Station Number 4.

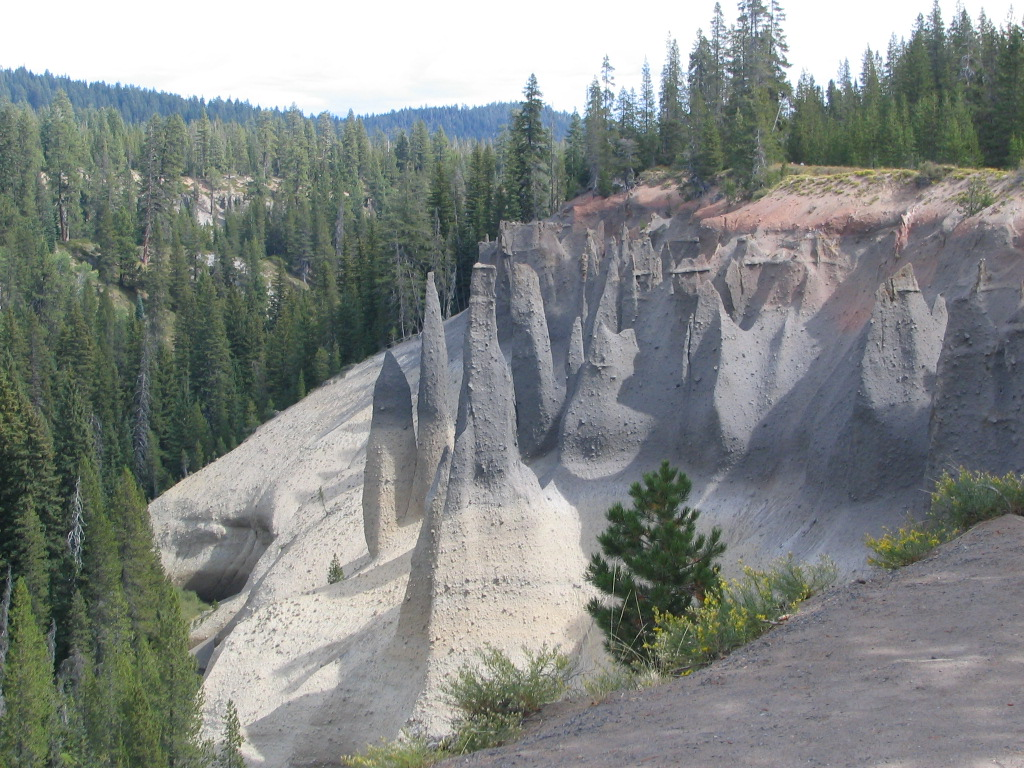
The Pinnacles.

- The Pumice Desert: A very thick layer of pumice and ash leading away from Mazama in a northerly direction. Even after thousands of years, this area is largely devoid of plants due to excessive porosity (meaning water drains through quickly) and poor soil composed primarily of regolith.
- The Pinnacles: When the very hot ash and pumice came to rest near the volcano, it formed 200-to-300-foot-thick (60 to 90 m) gas-charged deposits. For years afterward, hot gas moved to the surface and slowly cemented ash and pumice together in channels and escaped through fumaroles. Erosion later removed most of the surrounding loose ash and pumice, leaving tall pinnacles and spires.
- Mount Scott is a steep andesitic cone whose lava came from magma from Mazama's magma chamber; geologists call such volcano a parasitic or satellite cone. Volcanic eruptions apparently ceased on Scott sometime before the end of the Pleistocene; one remaining large cirque on Scott's northwest side was left unmodified by post-ice-age volcanism.
- In the southwest corner of the park stands Union Peak, an extinct volcano whose primary remains consist of a large volcanic plug, which is lava that solidified in the volcano's neck.
- Crater Peak is a shield volcano primarily made of andesite and basalt lava flows topped by andesitic and dacite tephra.
- Timber Crater is a shield volcano located in the northeast corner of the park. Like Crater Peak, it is made of basaltic and andesitic lava flows but, unlike Crater, it is topped by two cinder cones.
- Rim Drive is the most popular road in the park; it follows a scenic route around the caldera rim.
- Llao Rock on the north side rises 1,800 feet (550 m) above the lake, with a 1.3-mile (2.1 km) trail from Rim Drive leading to the summit.
- The Pacific Crest Trail, a 2,650-mile (4,260 km) long-distance hiking and equestrian trail that stretches from the Mexican to Canadian borders, passes through the park.
- Old-growth forests covering 50,000 acres (20,000 ha; 78 sq mi; 200 km^{2}).
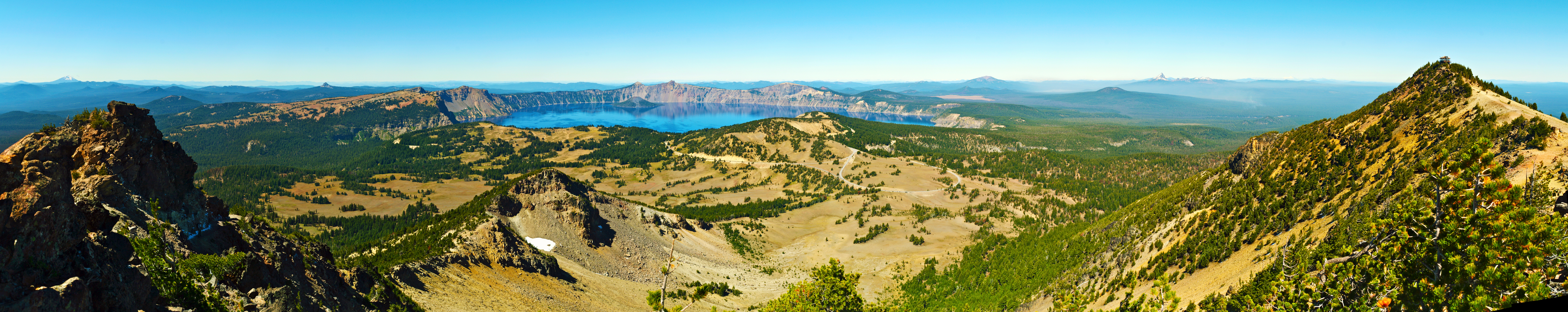
180-degree panoramic photograph of Crater Lake from the top of nearby Mount Scott, looking west. Two snow-covered peaks can be seen in the distance: to the right of the lake is Mount Thielsen, and in the far left of the photo is Mount McLoughlin.

== History ==
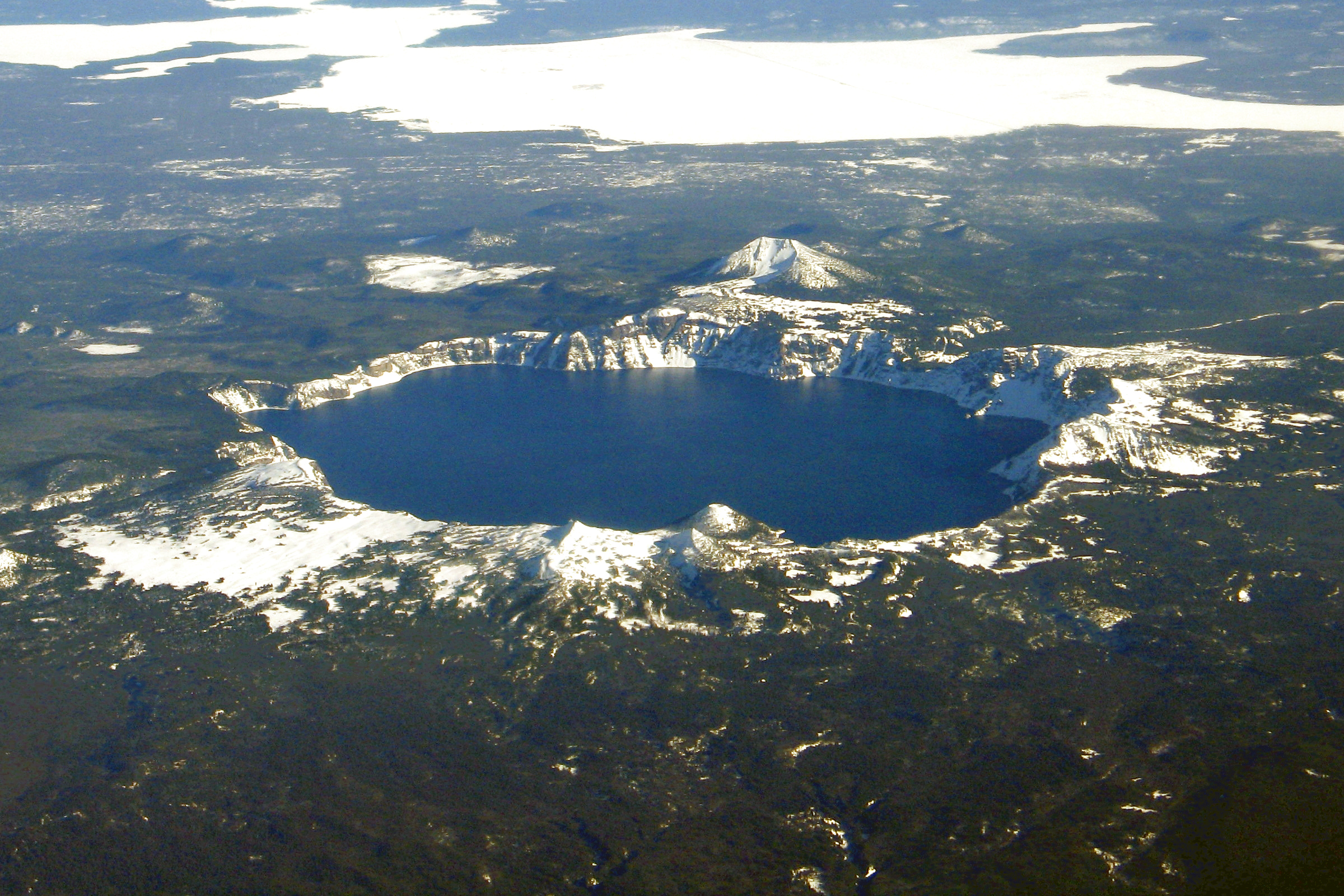
Aerial view of Crater Lake.

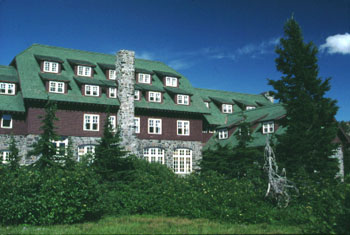
Crater Lake Lodge.

Local Native Americans witnessed the collapse of Mount Mazama and kept the event alive in their legends. One ancient legend of the Klamath people closely parallels the geologic story which emerges from today's scientific research. The legend tells of two Chiefs, Llao of the Below World and Skell of the Above World, pitted in a battle which ended up in the destruction of Llao's home, Mt. Mazama. The battle was witnessed in the eruption of Mt. Mazama and the creation of Crater Lake.

A trio of gold prospectors—John Wesley Hillman, Henry Klippel, and Isaac Skeeters—were the first American prospectors to visit the lake. On June 12, 1853, they stumbled upon the long, sloping mountain while hunting for provisions. Stunned by the vibrant blue color of the lake, they named the indigo body of water "Deep Blue Lake" and the place on the southwest side of the rim where he first saw the lake later became known as Discovery Point. Gold, however, was more on the minds of settlers at the time, and the discovery was soon forgotten. The suggested name later fell out of favor by locals, who preferred the name "Crater Lake".

William Gladstone Steel devoted his life and fortune to the establishment and management of a national park at Crater Lake. His preoccupation with the lake began in 1870. In his efforts to bring recognition to the park, he participated in lake surveys that provided scientific support. He named many of the lake's landmarks, including Wizard Island, Llao Rock, and Skell Head.

With the help of geologist Clarence Dutton, Steel organized a USGS expedition to study the lake in 1886. The party carried the Cleetwood, a half-ton survey boat, up the steep slopes of the mountain then lowered it to the lake. From the stern of the Cleetwood, a piece of pipe on the end of a spool of piano wire sounded the depth of the lake at 168 different points. Their deepest sounding, 1,996 feet (608 m), was very close to the modern official depth of 1,949 feet (594 m) made in 2000 by sonar. At the same time, a topographer surveyed the area and created the first professional map of the Crater Lake area.

Crater Lake National Park
- Long title: An Act reserving from the public lands in the State of Oregon, as a public park for the benefit of the people of the United States, and for the protection and preservation of the game, fish, timber, and all other natural objects therein, a tract of land herein described, and so forth.
- Enacted by: the 57th United States Congress
- Effective: May 22, 1902

Citations
- Public law: Pub. L. 57–121
- Statutes at Large: 32 Stat. 202

Codification
- Titles amended: Title 16—Conservation
- U.S.C. sections created: 16 U.S.C. §§ 121–123

Legislative history
- Introduced in the House as H.R. 4393 by Thomas H. Tongue (R–OR) on December 10, 1901; Committee consideration by House Public Lands; Passed the House on April 19, 1902 (unanimous consent); Passed the Senate on May 9, 1902 (unanimous consent); Signed into law by President Theodore Roosevelt on May 22, 1902

Partly based on data from the expedition and lobbying from Steel and others, Crater Lake National Park was established May 22, 1902, by President Theodore Roosevelt. And because of Steel's involvement, Crater Lake Lodge was opened in 1915 and the Rim Drive was completed in 1918.

Highways were later built to the park to help facilitate tourism. The 1929 edition of O Ranger! described access and facilities available by then:

Crater Lake National Park is reached by train on the Southern Pacific Railroad lines into Medford and Klamath Falls, at which stops motor stages make the short trip to the park. A hotel on the rim of the lake offers accommodations. For the motorist, the visit to the park is a short side trip from the Pacific and Dalles-California highways. He will find, in addition to the hotel, campsites, stores, filling stations. The park is open to travel from late June or July 1 for as long as snow does not block the roads, generally until October.

== Activities ==
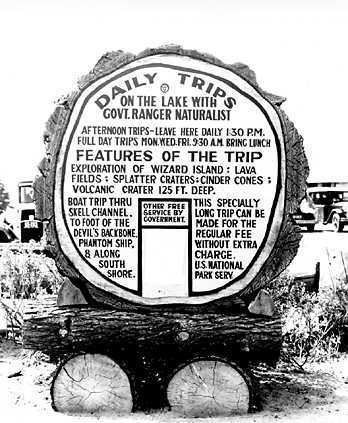
Daily Trips (1931).

Many hiking trails and several campgrounds are inside the park. Unlicensed fishing is allowed without any limitation of size, species, or number. The lake is believed to have no indigenous fish, but several species of fish were introduced beginning in 1888 until all fish stocking ended in 1941. Kokanee salmon (Oncorhynchus nerka) and rainbow trout (Oncorhynchus mykiss) now thrive and reproduce here. Swimming is allowed in the lake, and the boat tours, which stop at Wizard Island, a cinder cone inside the lake, operate daily during the summer. All lake access for people is from Cleetwood Trail, a steep walking trail, and there are no roads for cars, trucks, or wagons that lead to the waterfront. All of the boats in the lake were delivered by helicopter.

Numerous observation points along the caldera rim for the lake are readily accessible by automobile via the Rim Drive, which is 33 miles (53 km) long and has an elevation gain of 3,800 feet (1,200 m).

The highest point in Crater Lake National Park is Mount Scott at 8,929 feet (2,722 m). Getting there requires a fairly steep 2.5-mile (4.0 km) hike from the Rim Drive trailhead. On a clear day, visibility from the summit exceeds 100 miles (160 km), and one can, in a single view, take in the entire caldera. Also visible from this point are the white-peaked Cascade Range volcanoes to the north, the Columbia River Plateau to the east, and the Western Cascades and the more-distant Klamath Mountains to the west.

The scenery of Crater Lake is fully accessible during the summer months. Heavy snowfalls in this park during the fall, winter, and spring months force many road and trail closures, including the popular Rim Drive, which is generally completely open from July to October and partially open in some other months, such as May, June, and November.

== Trails ==
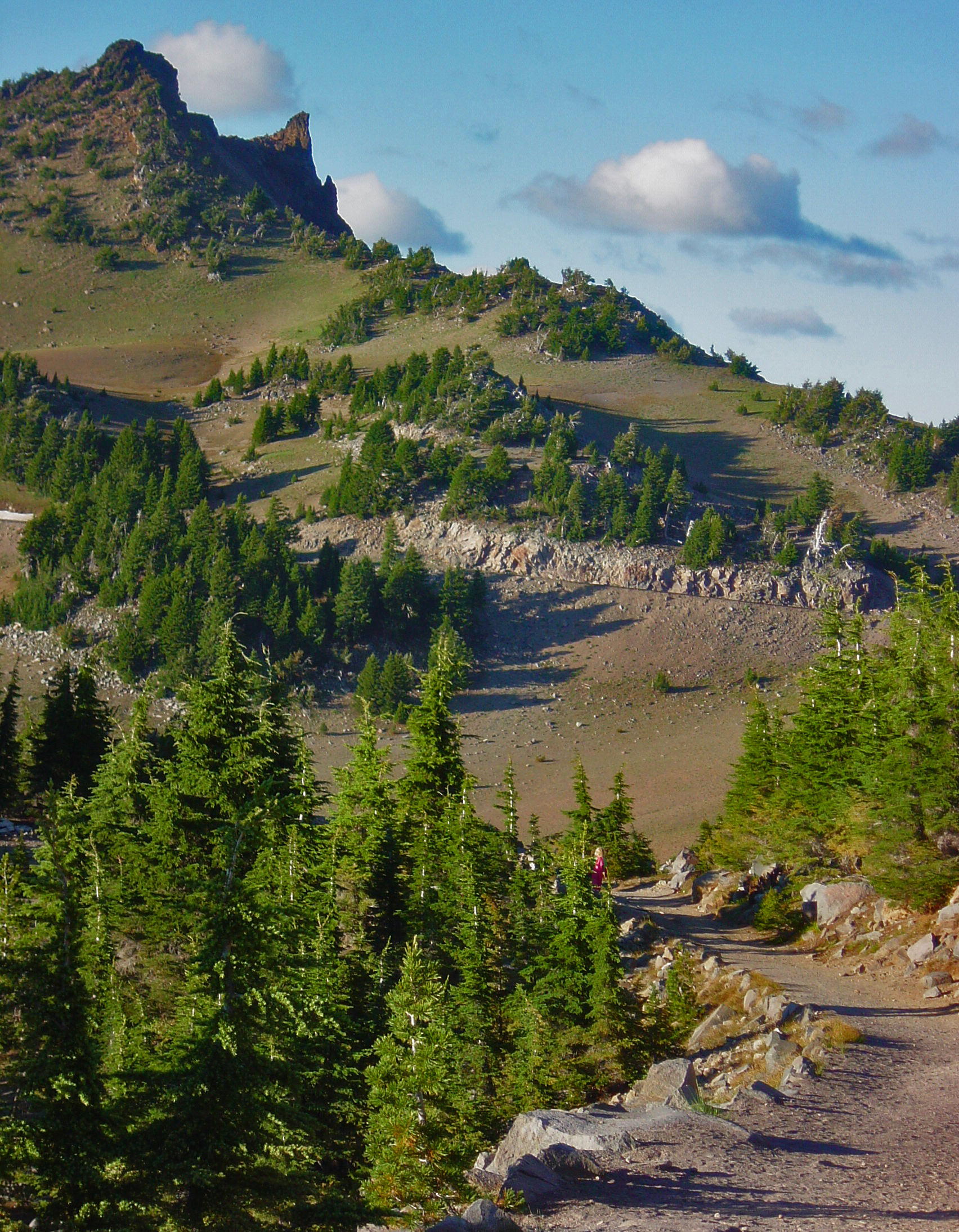
View up to Watchman Trail and peak.

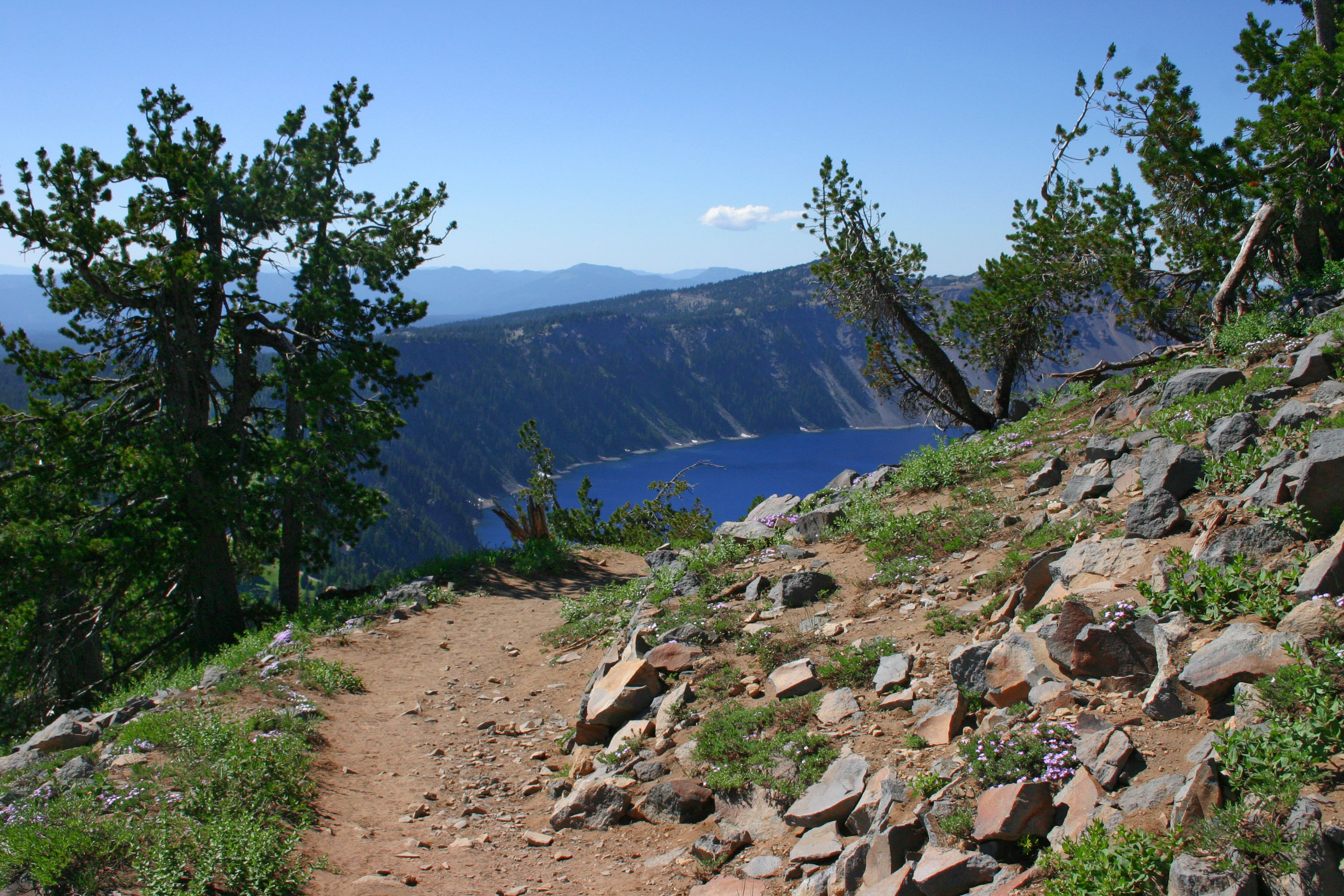
Garfield Peak trail, view east towards Crater Lake.

=== Cleetwood Cove ===
The Cleetwood Cove Trail originates on the north side of the lake about 4.5 mi (7.2 km) east of North Junction along East Rim Drive. The trail is the only one that accesses the shoreline of the lake, descending 656 feet (200 m) from the parking lot on East Rim Drive. First opened in 1960, the Cleetwood Cove Trail is 1.1 mi (1.8 km) long with an 11% grade; it is not accessible for mobility-impaired visitors. A dock with concessionaire boats facilitates tours around the lake with a stop at Wizard Island for dropping off and picking up passengers. Swimming and fishing are permitted.

In 2025, the trail will be closed for a two-year repair project due to erosion issues caused by its high traffic.

=== The Watchman ===
The Watchman Peak trail begins from the Watchman Overlook parking lot, about 3.8 mi (6.1 km) northwest of Rim Village. The trail is 0.8 mi (1.3 km) long with a 420-foot (130 m) elevation change. It is a steady uphill trail on an isolated mountain on the west rim of the crater, with several switchbacks, providing wide views of Crater Lake and Wizard Island. Several nearby landmarks are visible from the summit, including Mount McLoughlin, Mount Thielsen, Union Peak, Mount Scott, and the Klamath Basin. The trail ends next to a historic fire lookout tower built in 1932.

=== Lightning Spring ===
The Lightning Spring trail starts from the Lightning Spring picnic area. It is a 3/4-mile (1.2 km) hike with an elevation gain of 250 feet (76 m). The trail circles around several meadows up to the Lightning Spring creek. The trail is known for the frequent sight of grazing deer.

=== Castle Crest Wildflower Garden ===
This is considered to be the easiest trail, looping around the Castle Crest Wildflower Garden. It starts from the East Rim Road, near the park's headquarters. It received its name because of a large stretch of meadows around which the trail circles and which is bursting with wildflowers in the springtime. The trail is about 1/2 mile (800 m) before it reaches the wildflower meadow garden, from which other improvised routes depart.

=== Plaikni Falls ===
The Plaikni Falls trail is the newest trail in the Crater Lake park. It stretches 1.1 miles (1.8 km) from the trailhead located 1.2 miles (1.9 km) south from the Phantom Ship Overlook on Pinnacles Road, which spins off Rim Drive. The trail leads to Plaikni Falls. Most of the trail is wheelchair-accessible. The final stretch is fairly uphill, which may prove moderately challenging.

=== Garfield Peak ===
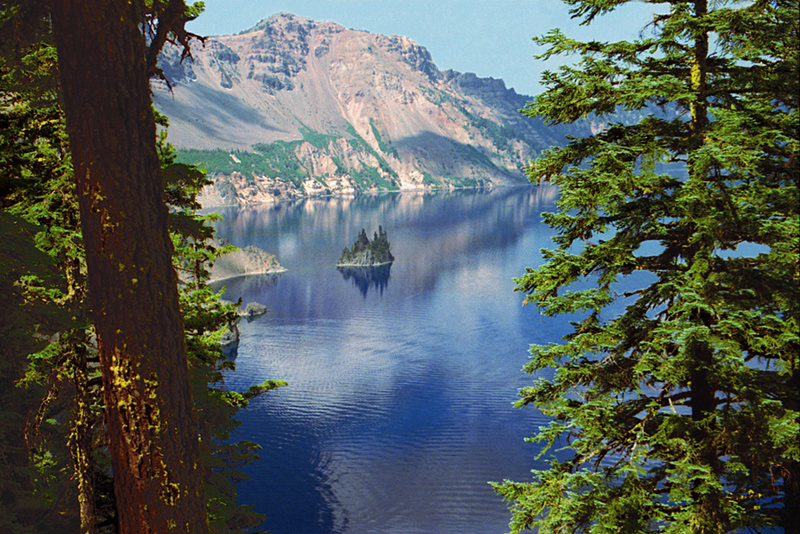
Phantom Ship.

The Garfield Peak trail is a moderately challenging 1.7-mile (2.7 km) hike to Garfield Peak. The trailhead is located east of the Crater Lake Lodge and gains approximately 1,000 feet (300 m) of elevation. Several spots along the trail provide viewpoints overlooking the Phantom Ship island and Dutton Cliff. A few viewpoints offer unique views of Wizard island. The trail is popular in the late afternoon on account of unique shifting colors over the lake and its surroundings.

== See also ==
- List of national parks of the United States
- High Cascades Complex Fires
- National Park Service Rustic about the architecture of the park structures
- National Register of Historic Places listings in Crater Lake National Park
- Protected areas of the United States
- Volcanic Legacy Scenic Byway
