= Plaikni Falls =

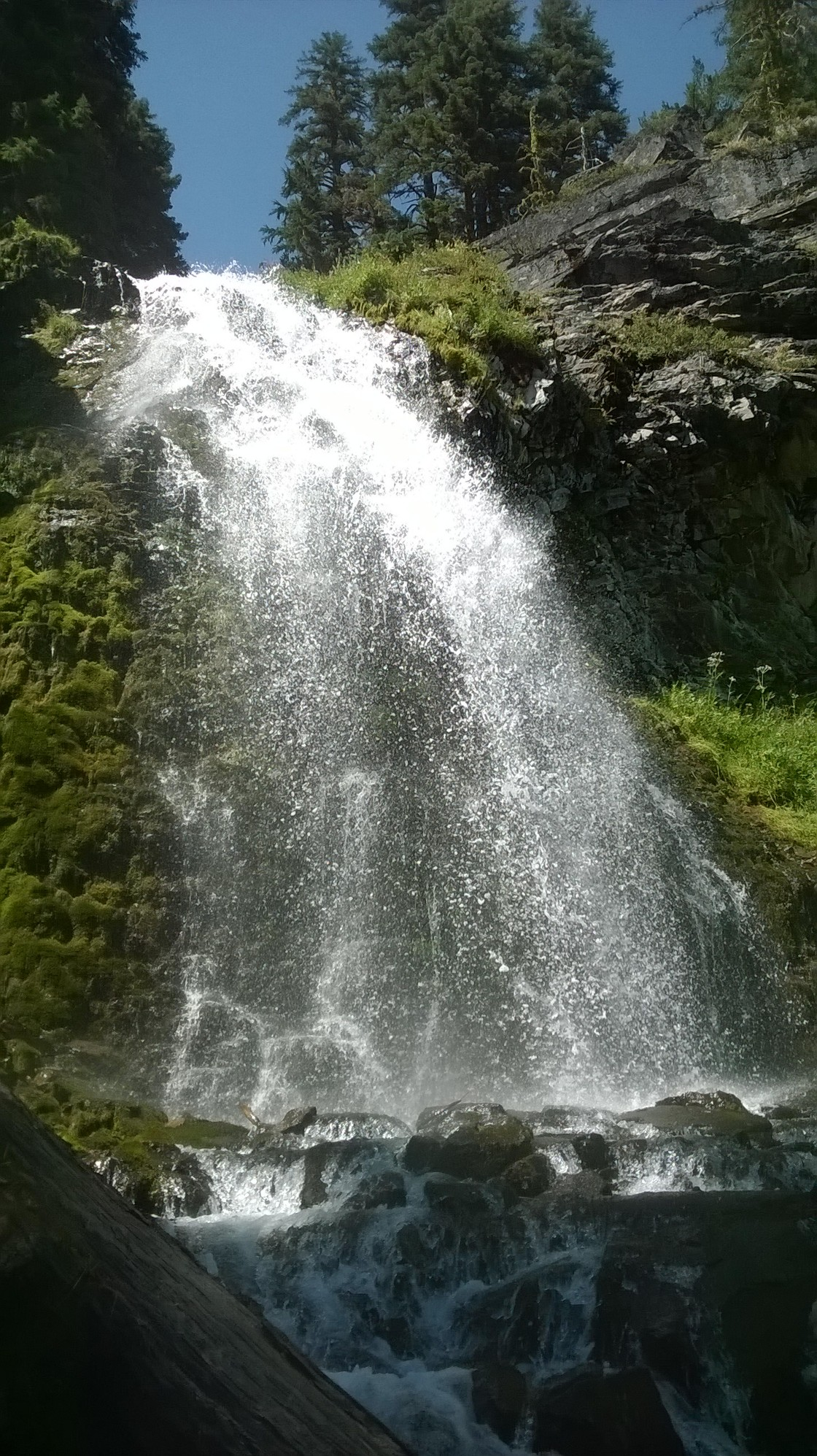
- Plainki Falls in August
- Interactive map of Plaikni Falls
- Location: Crater Lake National Park
- Coordinates: 42.90939°N 122.04912°W
- Type: Plunge
- Elevation: 6,656 ft (2,029 m)
- Total height: 20 ft (6.1 m)

Plaikni Falls, is a waterfall located along the East Rim Drive within the Crater Lake National Park at the south end of Mount Scott, in Klamath County, in the U.S. state of Oregon. The waterfall is located in a glacier carved cliff surrounded by walls of petrified volcanic ash consequence of Mount Mazama eruption.

The location of Plaikni Falls wasn't known by many until the park constructed a new trail in 2011, making the Plainki Falls trail one of the most popular destinations along the Crater Lake Rim Drives. Full views of the cascade can be seen at the end of an easy 1-mile walk on a wheel-chair accessible trail. The trail is surrounded by old-growth fir and hemlock forests rich in wildflowers.

The name of the waterfall stems from a Native American word that means "from the high country".

== See also ==
- List of waterfalls in Oregon
