= Old Man of the Lake =

Log that has been floating in Crater Lake since at least 1896

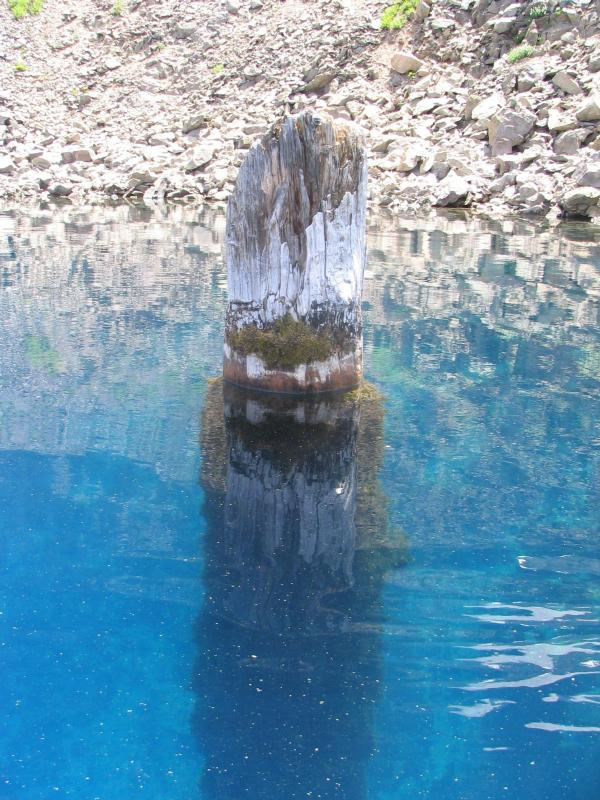
The Old Man of the Lake in 2013

The Old Man of the Lake is a 30-foot (9 m) tall tree trunk, most likely a hemlock, that has been bobbing vertically in Crater Lake in Oregon, United States since at least 1896.

The trunk is about 2 feet (61 cm) in diameter at the waterline and stands approximately 4 feet (1.2 m) above the water. Its surface has been bleached white due to photodegradation. The exposed end of the floating tree is splintered and worn but wide and buoyant enough to support a person's weight.

Fontinalis, a moss present in the waters of Crater Lake at a depth of 394 feet (120 m), also grows on the Old Man of the Lake, the only place the moss is found near the surface.

== History ==
Joseph S. Diller published the first geology of Crater Lake in 1902, the same year the area became a national park. In his work, Diller briefly describes a great trunk he had found in the lake six years earlier, in a report dated 1896. Preliminary carbon dating of the trunk has suggested that the tree itself is at least 450 years old.

Diller established that the trunk could travel by tying baling wire around it and pulling it a short distance. Five years later, Diller observed the Old Man to be 1/4 mile (400 m) from the location he had previously noted. The earliest known photograph of the trunk dates to this period.

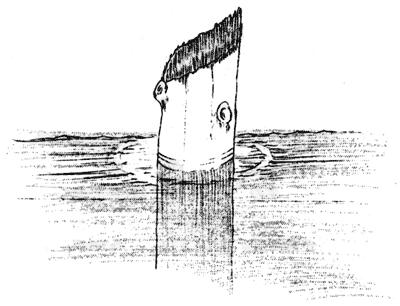
A sketch of the "Old Man of the Lake" published in 1938

As the result of an inquiry from Washington, D.C., the project of recording the Old Man's location was undertaken between July 1 and September 30, 1938. Those observations indicated that it travels quite extensively, and sometimes with surprising speed. During the period of observation in 1938, the Old Man traveled at least 62.1 miles (99.9 km). The greatest movements occurred on days of high wind and waves.

Since it can be virtually anywhere on the lake, boat captains commonly communicated its position to each other as a general matter of safety (although private boating is prohibited on Crater Lake today).

In 1988, submarine explorations were conducted in the lake, and the scientists decided to tie the Old Man off the eastern side of Wizard Island to neutralize the navigational hazard until their research work was complete. Upon immobilizing the log, the weather went from clear to stormy. After it started snowing in August, they released the Old Man. Soon after, the weather cleared up, encouraging superstitions.

As of January 2012, tour boats regularly pass the Old Man on their journeys to view the sights around Crater Lake. Due to the lake's water clarity, the entire submerged section of the tree's trunk can be seen below the waterline.

== See also ==
- List of individual trees
