= The Pinnacles (Crater Lake) =

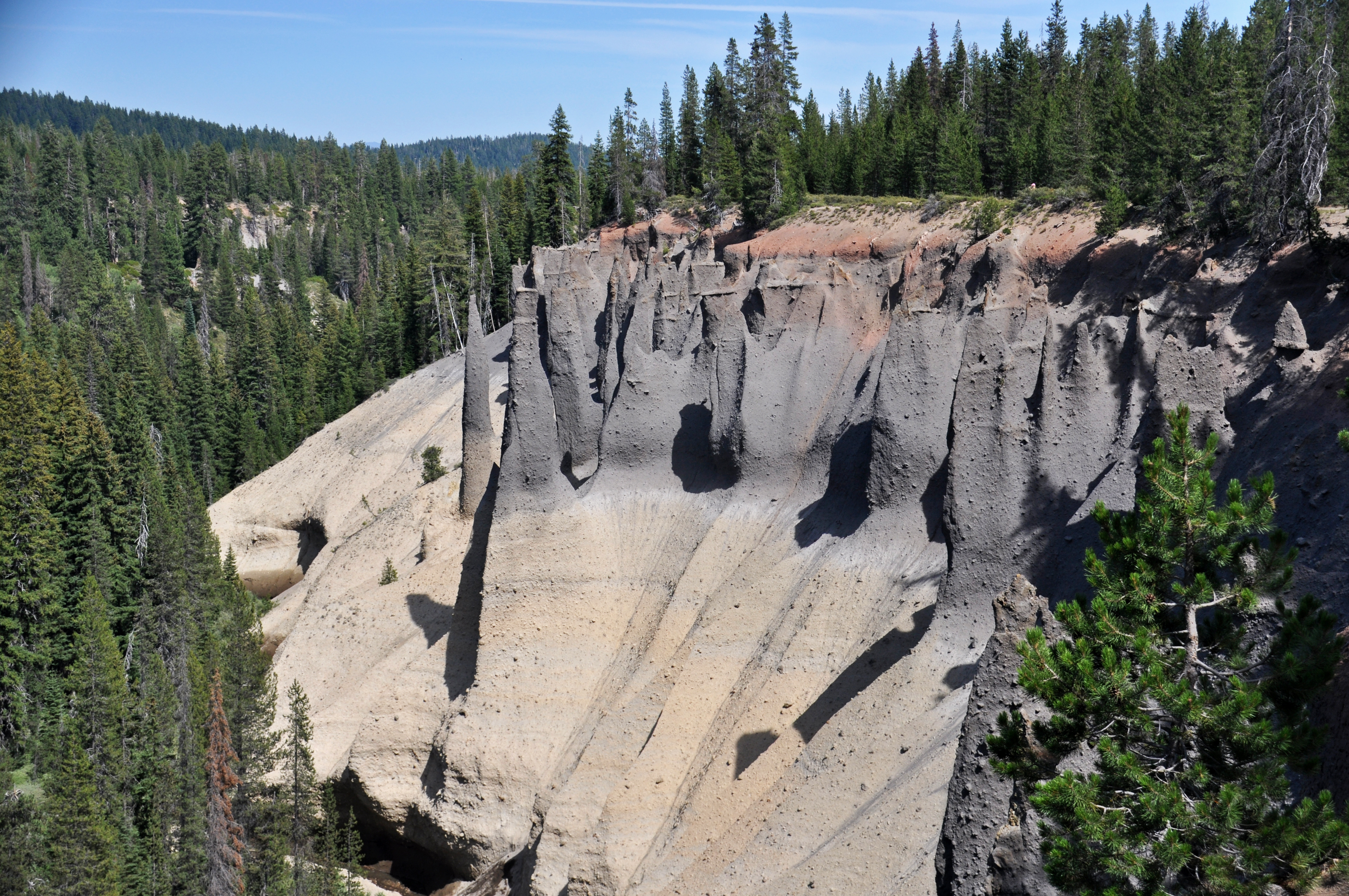

At Crater Lake National Park, The Pinnacles are a series of fossil fumaroles formed from pyroclasts after the eruption of Mount Mazama. They were an early tourist attraction for visitors arriving by horse-drawn carriage at the old east entrance.

The final eruption of Mount Mazama blew volcanic material miles into the air. This was followed by the ejection of gas-charged matter through vents in fractures around the mountain which weakened and ultimately caused the upper mountain to collapse. Rather than rising upwards, the volcanic matter ejected through vents flowed rapidly downhill, filling surrounding valleys to a depth of 300 ft (100 m). Once the flows stopped, trapped gases escaped through fumaroles, and surrounding material hardened. As the streams reclaimed the valley the erosion-resistant spires were exposed.

The classic view is located in Wheeler Creek Canyon at the end of Pinnacles Road from East Rim Drive. A 0.8 (1.3 km) trail is an easy walk along the rim of the valley where the pinnacles are visible.
