= Phantom Ship (island) =

Island in Crater Lake, Oregon

Phantom Ship Island
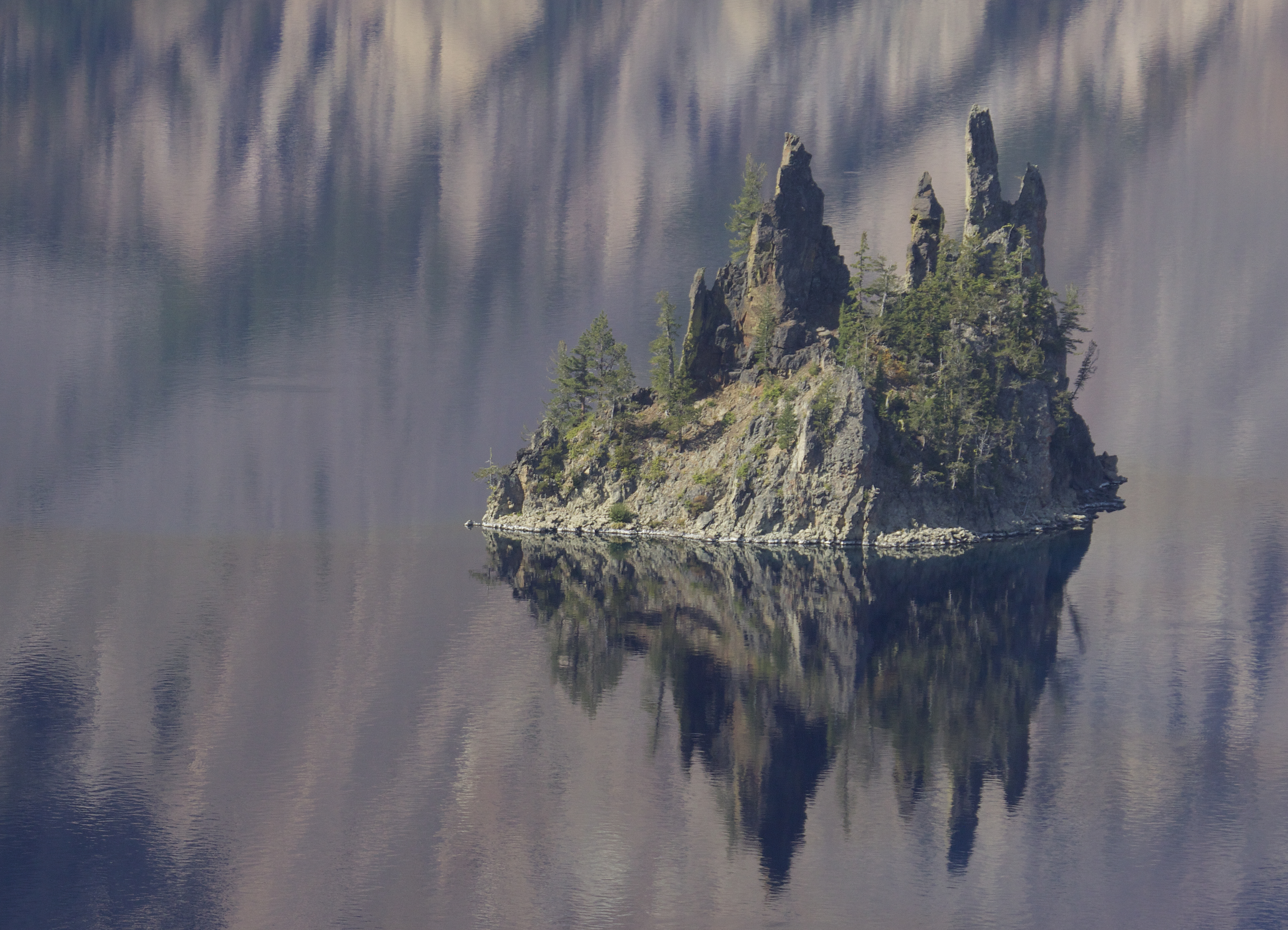
- Interactive map of Phantom Ship Island

Geography
- Location: Crater Lake
- Coordinates: 42°54′40″N 122°5′30″W
- Length: 500 ft (150 m)
- Width: 200 ft (60 m)
- Highest elevation: 170 ft (52 m)

Administration
- United States
- State: Oregon
- County: Klamath County

Phantom Ship is a small island in Crater Lake in the U.S. state of Oregon. It is a natural rock formation pillar which derives its name from its resemblance to a ghost ship, especially in foggy and low-light conditions.

== General ==
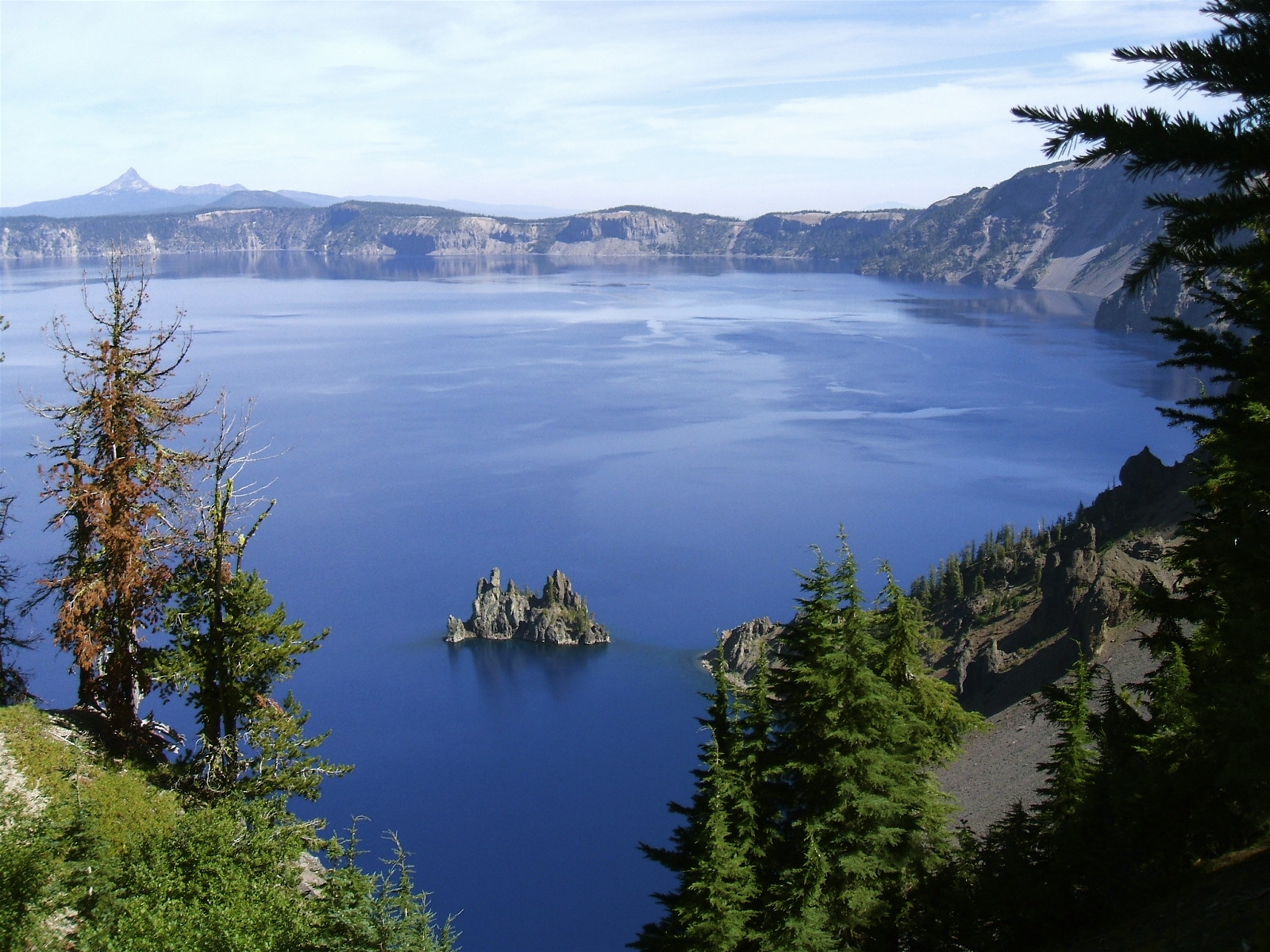
Phantom Ship from the Sun Notch viewpoint

Phantom Ship Island is mainly formed from andesite rock that dates from about 400,000 years ago, partly altered by hydrothermal activity. The island is situated on the south east end of Crater Lake and projects more than 200 m (656 ft) out from the wall of the caldera. The island is about 500 ft by 200 ft in size. The vegetation is similar to that on Wizard Island except for the lodgepole pine (Pinus contorta) which is absent on Phantom Ship. The island forms the part of a submerged stratovolcano cone that is jaggedly sticking out of the water.
