= Mount Scott (Klamath County, Oregon) =

Extinct volcano in Crater Lake National Park, Oregon

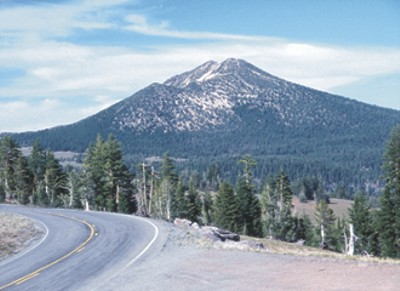
- Mount Scott viewed from the southwest

Highest point
- Elevation: 8,934 ft (2,723 m)
- Prominence: 3,009 ft (917 m)
- Listing: Oregon Prominent Peaks 22nd; Oregon Highest Peaks 35th; Cascade Volcanoes
- Coordinates: 42°55′22″N 122°00′59″W

Geography
- Location within Oregon
- Location: Klamath County, Oregon, U.S.
- Region(s): Oregon, United States
- Parent range: Cascades
- Topo map: USGS Crater Lake East

Geology
- Rock age: About 420,000 years
- Mountain type: Stratovolcano
- Volcanic arc: Cascade Volcanic Arc
- Last eruption: 420,000 years ago

Mount Scott is a small stratovolcano and a so-called parasitic cone on the southeast flank of Crater Lake in southern Oregon. It is approximately 420,000 years old. Its summit is the highest point within Crater Lake National Park, and the tenth highest peak in the Oregon Cascades. A small fire lookout tower stands on the summit, at the end of a trail that zigzags approximately 1,500 feet (460 m) up the mountain. The mountain is named for Oregon pioneer Levi Scott, founder of Scottsburg, Oregon.

== Geology ==
Mount Scott first erupted about 420,000 years ago and is one of the oldest volcanoes in the Mount Mazama complex. It erupted mainly andesitic lavas before becoming extinct in the late Pleistocene. Since it was relatively far away from the main flanks of Mount Mazama, it survived the mountain's massive explosion that occurred around 5700 BC. At 8,934 feet (2,723 m) tall, Mount Scott is the highest point in Crater Lake National Park. Most of the lower slopes are covered with ash, pumice, and loose gravel, while the summit is mostly covered with scoria.

== Flora ==
Many species of plants inhabit the slopes of Mount Scott. The most common species of trees include Douglas fir, white pine, hemlock, whitebark pine, lodgepole pine. Wildflowers, such as Indian paintbrush, penstemon, forget-me-nots, wild onions, and buttercups can be found on the mountain.

== Trail ==
There is one trail to the summit of Mount Scott. Starting on Rim Drive, the trail is about 2.5 miles (4.0 km) long. It has many switchbacks, and ends at the fire lookout tower on the summit. The trailhead is at an elevation of 7,683 feet (2,342 m), and the trail climbs approximately 1,479 feet (451 m) to the top of Mount Scott at 8,934 feet (2,723 m).

Panoramic views of Crater Lake can be seen from the summit. Mount Thielsen, Diamond Peak, Mount McLoughlin, Mount Shasta, Upper Klamath Lake, and Diamond Lake are other landmarks that can be seen from the summit.

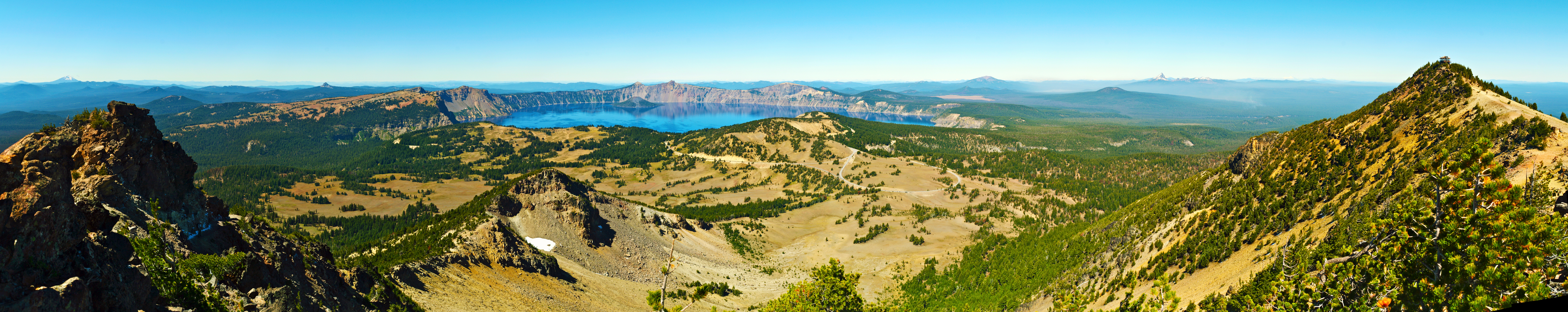
A panorama of Crater Lake and its surroundings from Mount Scott
