= Pumice Desert =

Dry meadow in Oregon, USA

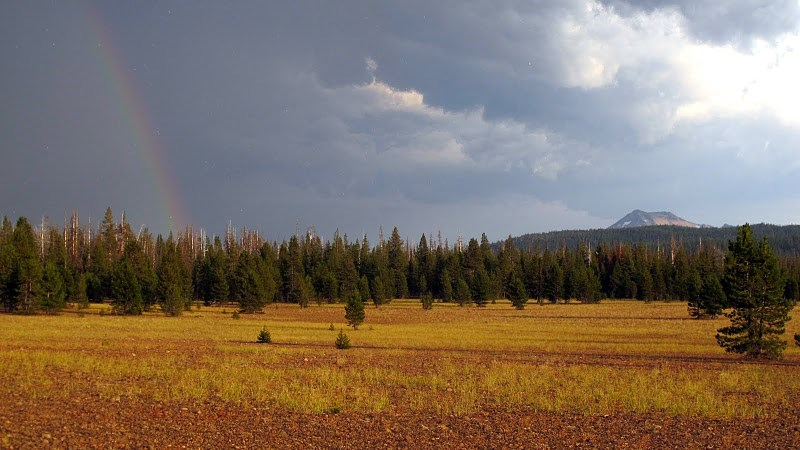
Pumice Desert

Pumice Desert is a dry meadow in Oregon's Crater Lake National Park. It covers 3,055 acres (4.8 sq mi; 12.4 km^{2}) and is located along the North Entrance Park Road.

Pumice Desert was a glacial valley before the eruption of Mount Mazama 7,700 years ago. The valley was buried in over 200 feet (61.0 m) of pumice and scoria during the eruptions and subsequent avalanches.

The area was designated as a Research Natural Area due to the environment's harsh, "desert"-like quality resulting from the deep and highly porous deposits. There are currently only 16 species of plant documented in this area.
