= Crater Lake =

Caldera lake in Oregon, United States

- Giiwas (Klamath-Modoc)
- Crater Lake and Wizard Island from Lake Lodge area in 2023

- Location in Oregon Crater Lake (the United States)

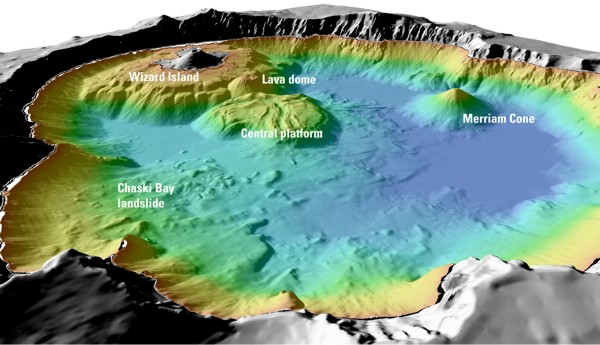
- Bathymetric survey
- Location: Klamath County, Oregon
- Coordinates: 42°57′N 122°06′W
- Lake type: Volcanic crater lake
- Primary inflows: precipitation and snowmelt only
- Primary outflows: evaporation, subsurface seepage to Wood River
- Catchment area: 23.3 sq mi (60 km^{2})
- Basin countries: United States
- Max. length: 6 mi (9.7 km)
- Max. width: 5 mi (8.0 km)
- Surface area: 20.6 sq mi (53 km^{2})
- Average depth: 1,148 ft (350 m)
- Max. depth: 1,949 ft (594 m)
- Water volume: 4.49 cu mi (18.7 km^{3})
- Residence time: 157 years
- Shore length^{1}: 21.8 mi (35.1 km)
- Surface elevation: 6,178 ft (1,883 m)
- Frozen: January; March
- Islands: Wizard Island; Phantom Ship
- ^{1} Shore length is not a well-defined measure.

Crater Lake (Klamath: Giiwas) is a volcanic crater lake in south-central Oregon in the Western United States. It is the main feature of Crater Lake National Park and is a tourist attraction known for its deep blue color and water clarity. The lake partly fills a 2,148-foot-deep (655 m) caldera that was formed around 7,700 (± 150) years ago by the collapse of the volcano Mount Mazama. No rivers flow into or out of the lake; the evaporation is compensated for by rain and snowfall at a rate such that the total amount of water is replaced every 150 years. With a depth of 1,949 feet (594 m), the lake is the deepest in the United States. In the world, it ranks eleventh for maximum depth, as well as fifth for mean depth.

Crater Lake features two small islands. Wizard Island, located near the western shore of the lake, is a cinder cone about 316 acres (128 hectares) in size. Phantom Ship, a natural rock pillar, is located near the southern shore.

Since 2002, one of Oregon's regular-issue license-plate design has featured Crater Lake and a one-time plate surcharge is used to support the operation of Crater Lake National Park. The commemorative Oregon State Quarter, which was released by the United States Mint in 2005, features an image of Crater Lake on its reverse.

The lake and surrounding park areas offer many recreational activities, including hiking, biking, snowshoeing, fishing, and cross-country skiing, and during the summer, campgrounds and lodges at Crater Lake are open to visitors.

== Location ==
Crater Lake is in Klamath County, around 60 miles (97 km) northwest of the county seat of Klamath Falls, and about 80 miles (130 km) northeast of the city of Medford.

A Native American connection with this area has been traced back to before the eruption of Mount Mazama. Archaeologists have found sandals and other artifacts buried under layers of ash, dust, and pumice that antedate the eruption roughly 7,700 years ago. Crater Lake remains significant to the Klamath tribes today. The Klamath name for the lake is Giiwas.

In June 1853, Isaac Skeeter, John Wesley Hillman, and another man were the first non-Native Americans to report sighting the lake, while on a mining trip; Skeeter named it "Deep Blue Lake", inspired by Hillman's description of the site. The lake was renamed at least three times, as Blue Lake, Lake Majesty, and finally Crater Lake.

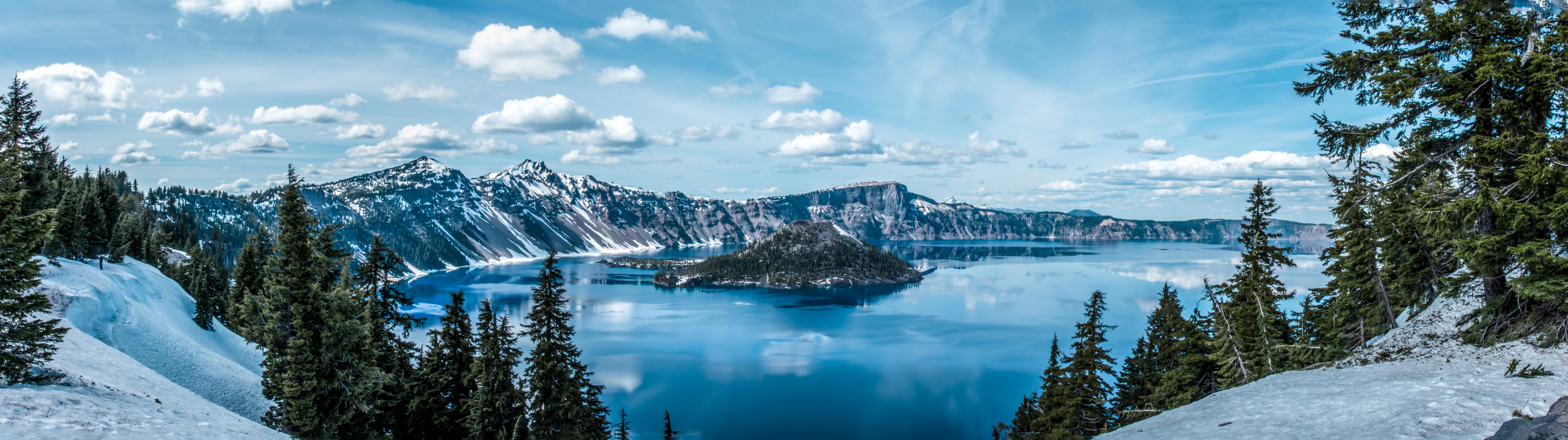
Panoramic view of Crater Lake – spring 2016

== Dimensions and depth ==
The lake is 5 by 6 miles (8.0 by 9.7 km) across, with a caldera rim ranging in elevation from 7,000 to 8,000 feet (2,100 to 2,400 m) and an average lake depth of 1,148 feet (350 m). The lake's maximum depth has been measured at 1,949 feet (594 m), which fluctuates slightly as the weather changes. On the basis of maximum depth, Crater Lake is the deepest lake in the United States, the second-deepest in North America (after Great Slave Lake in Canada), and the eleventh-deepest lake in the world. Crater Lake is often cited as the seventh-deepest lake in the world, but this ranking excludes Lake Vostok in Antarctica, which is beneath about 13,000 feet (4,000 m) of ice, and the recent depth soundings of O'Higgins/San Martín Lake, which is along the border of Chile and Argentina.

When considering the mean, or average depth of lakes, Crater Lake becomes the deepest lake in the Western Hemisphere and the third-deepest in the world. Crater Lake Institute Director and limnologist Owen Hoffman states that "Crater Lake is the deepest, when compared on the basis of average depth among lakes whose basins are entirely above sea level. The average depths of Lakes Baikal and Tanganyika are deeper than Crater Lake; however, both have basins that extend below sea level."

== Geology ==
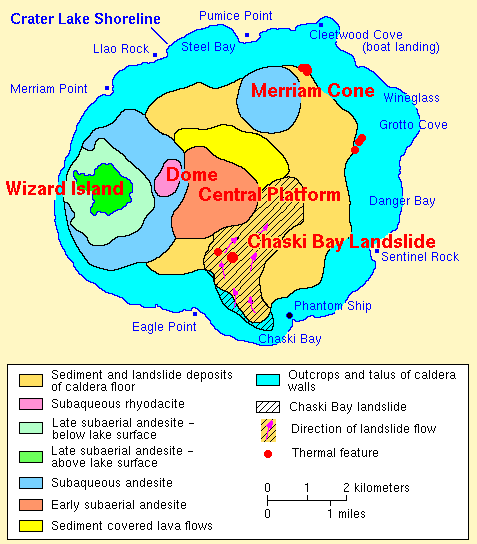
Geologic map of the lake floor

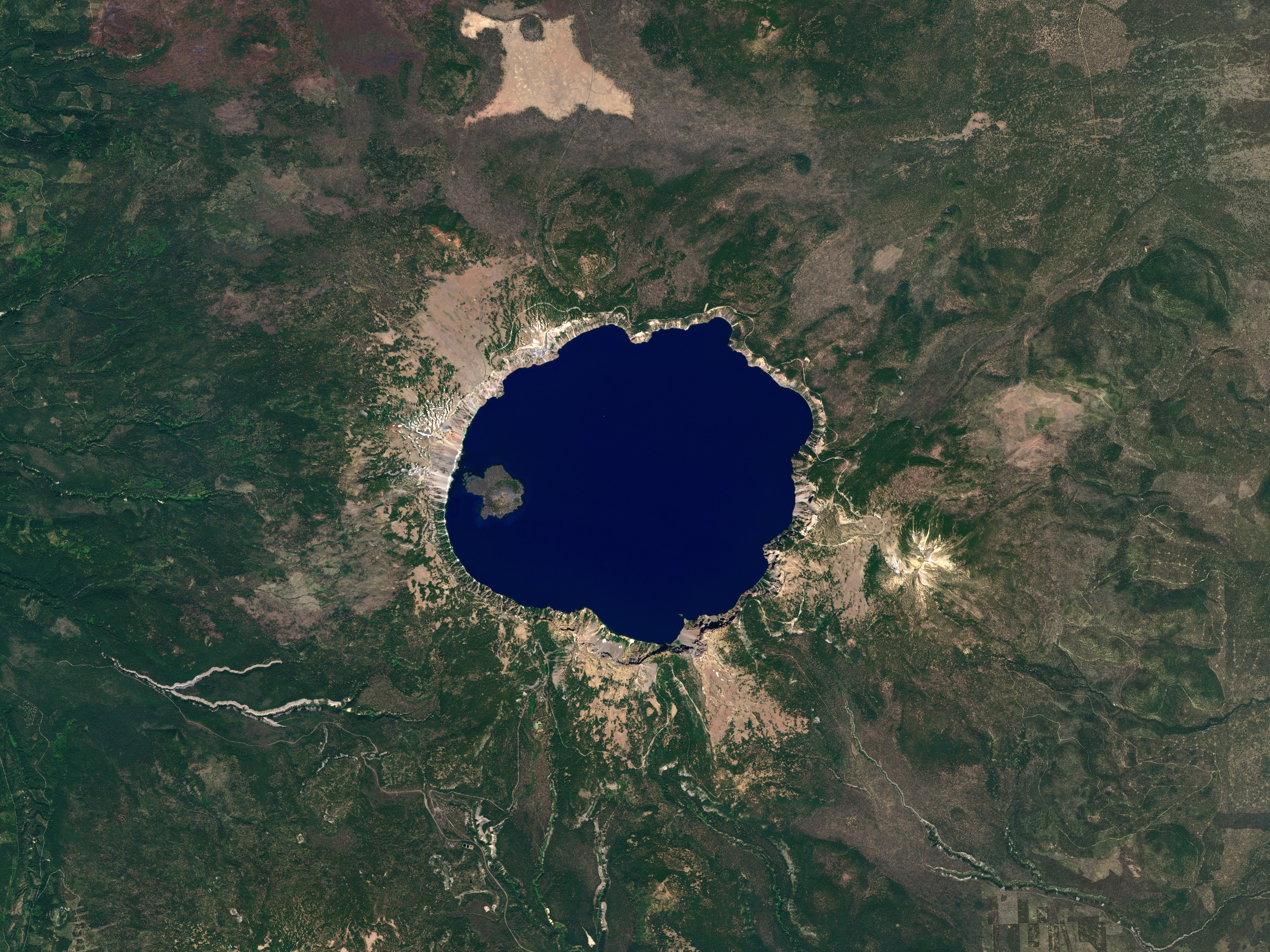
Crater Lake from space

Mount Mazama, part of the Cascade Range volcanic arc, was built up mostly of andesite, dacite, and rhyodacite over a period of at least 400,000 years. The caldera was created in a massive volcanic eruption between 6,000 and 8,000 years ago that led to the subsidence of Mount Mazama. About 12 cubic miles (50 km^{3}) of rhyodacite was erupted in this event. Since that time, all eruptions on Mazama have been confined to the caldera.

Lava eruptions later created a central platform, Wizard Island, Merriam Cone, and other, smaller volcanic features, including a rhyodacite dome that was eventually created atop the central platform. Sediments and landslide debris also covered the caldera floor.

Eventually, the caldera cooled, allowing rain and snow to accumulate and form a lake. Landslides from the caldera rim thereafter formed debris fans and turbidite sediments on the lake bed. Fumaroles and hot springs remained common and active during this period. Also after some time, the slopes of the lake's caldera rim more or less stabilized, streams restored a radial drainage pattern on the mountain, and dense forests began to revegetate the barren landscape. It is estimated that around 720 years was required to fill the lake to its present depth of 1,949 feet (594 m). Much of this occurred during a period when the prevailing climate was less moist than at present.

Some hydrothermal activity remains along the lake floor, suggesting that at some time in the future, Mazama may erupt once again.

== Climate ==
Crater Lake features a subalpine climate, with the rare dry-summer type (Köppen classification Dsc) owing to its high elevation and – like all of Oregon – the strong summer influence of the North Pacific High. In the summer, the weather is mild and dry, but in the winter is cold and the powerful influence of the Aleutian Low allows for enormous snowfalls averaging 463.1 inches (11.76 m) per year and maximum snow cover averaging 139 in or 3.53 m. This snow does not usually melt until mid-July, and allows for substantial glaciers on adjacent mountains. In the winter of 1949/1950 as much as 885.1 inches (22.48 m) of snow fell, while the less complete snow cover records show cover as high as 192 in or 4.88 m occurred during another particularly unsettled winter in 1981/1982. The heaviest daily snowfall was 37.0 inches (94.0 cm), which occurred as recently as February 28, 1971; 20 in (51 cm) or more in one storm has occurred in both June and September. Hard frost is possible even into the summer, and the average window for freezing temperatures is August 20 through July 10, while for measurable (≥0.1 in or 0.25 cm) snowfall, September 28 through June 11. Crater Lake's surface seldom freezes during winter months. Its resistance to surface freezing is due to the underlying heat reservoir remaining from summer heating. Abnormally cold temperatures in early 1949 froze the lake completely for three months. Ice first appeared around the shoreline and gradually grew towards the center of the lake. After the surface was solid, snowfalls deposited four feet of snow on the two inches to one foot of ice. While the lake was frozen, several groups of park employees walked to Wizard Island. Newspaper articles give evidence that Crater Lake froze over at least twice in the 1920's. With the warming climate of southern Oregon, complete freezing of the lake is becoming less likely though thin skim ice occasionally forms small patches on the surface. In 1985, skim ice covered over half the lake's surface.

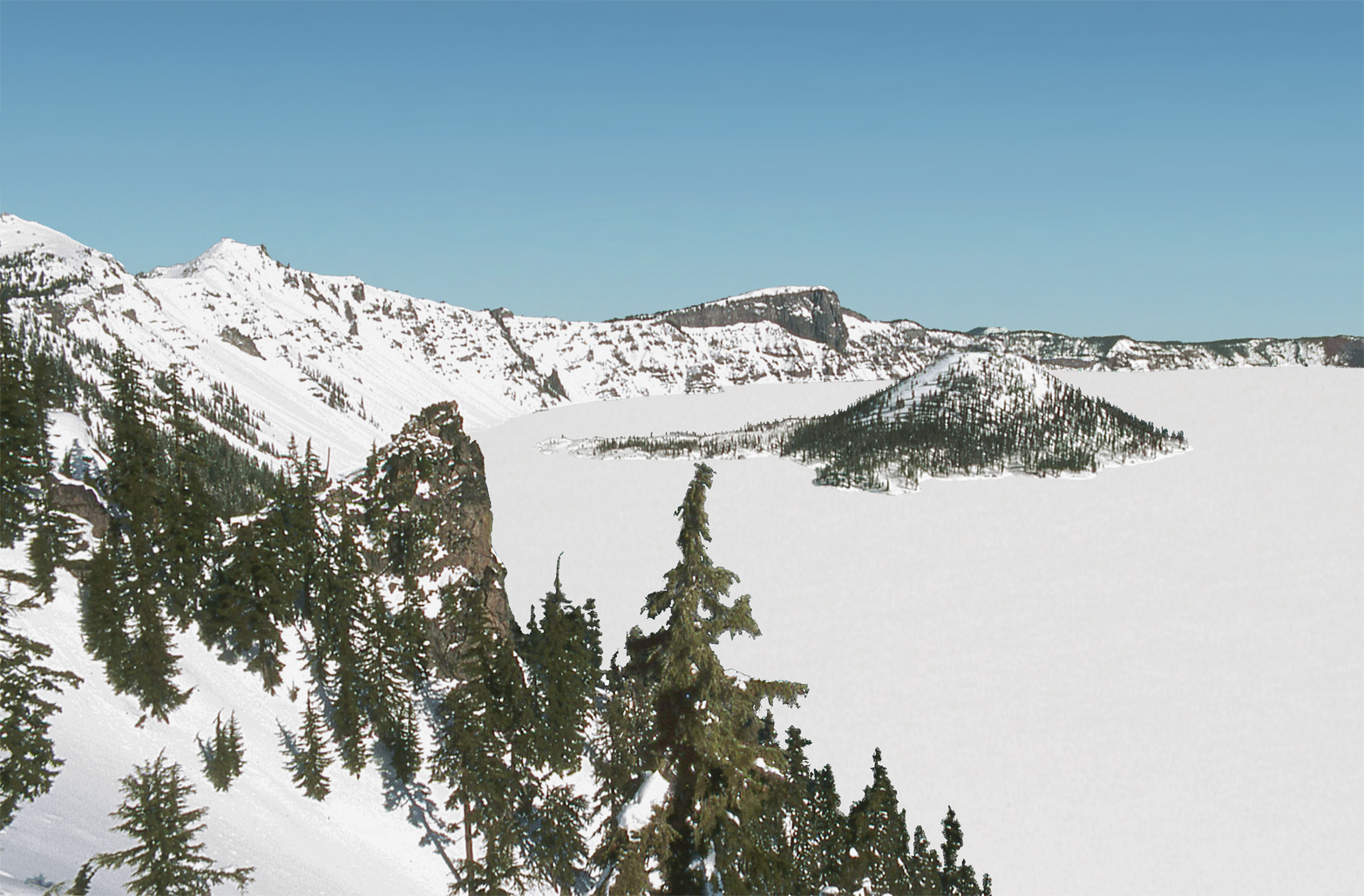
Simulation of 1949 frozen Crater Lake

Climate data for Crater Lake National Park Headquarters, Oregon, 1991–2020 normals, extremes 1919–present
Month	Jan	Feb	Mar	Apr	May	Jun	Jul	Aug	Sep	Oct	Nov	Dec	Year
Record high °F (°C)	64 (18)	66 (19)	67 (19)	71 (22)	80 (27)	96 (36)	100 (38)	94 (34)	93 (34)	81 (27)	71 (22)	64 (18)	100 (38)
Mean maximum °F (°C)	49.4 (9.7)	49.5 (9.7)	53.0 (11.7)	59.3 (15.2)	66.7 (19.3)	73.8 (23.2)	81.1 (27.3)	81.8 (27.7)	77.7 (25.4)	69.7 (20.9)	56.4 (13.6)	47.7 (8.7)	83.3 (28.5)
Mean daily maximum °F (°C)	33.4 (0.8)	33.6 (0.9)	36.1 (2.3)	40.3 (4.6)	49.0 (9.4)	57.0 (13.9)	68.9 (20.5)	69.3 (20.7)	63.0 (17.2)	50.7 (10.4)	38.0 (3.3)	32.7 (0.4)	47.7 (8.7)
Daily mean °F (°C)	26.6 (−3.0)	26.3 (−3.2)	28.2 (−2.1)	31.7 (−0.2)	39.2 (4.0)	45.3 (7.4)	55.1 (12.8)	55.4 (13.0)	50.1 (10.1)	40.4 (4.7)	30.6 (−0.8)	25.9 (−3.4)	37.9 (3.3)
Mean daily minimum °F (°C)	19.8 (−6.8)	18.9 (−7.3)	20.3 (−6.5)	23.1 (−4.9)	29.3 (−1.5)	33.6 (0.9)	41.4 (5.2)	41.5 (5.3)	37.1 (2.8)	30.2 (−1.0)	23.2 (−4.9)	19.1 (−7.2)	28.1 (−2.2)
Mean minimum °F (°C)	5.9 (−14.5)	5.4 (−14.8)	6.6 (−14.1)	10.3 (−12.1)	17.1 (−8.3)	24.2 (−4.3)	31.7 (−0.2)	31.4 (−0.3)	26.1 (−3.3)	17.8 (−7.9)	9.0 (−12.8)	4.2 (−15.4)	−0.7 (−18.2)
Record low °F (°C)	−21 (−29)	−18 (−28)	−7 (−22)	−3 (−19)	5 (−15)	10 (−12)	18 (−8)	16 (−9)	16 (−9)	3 (−16)	−7 (−22)	−18 (−28)	−21 (−29)
Average precipitation inches (mm)	10.10 (257)	7.53 (191)	7.81 (198)	6.16 (156)	3.65 (93)	2.27 (58)	0.80 (20)	0.83 (21)	1.93 (49)	4.80 (122)	9.60 (244)	11.28 (287)	66.76 (1,696)
Average snowfall inches (cm)	86.5 (220)	68.9 (175)	71.9 (183)	48.7 (124)	14.5 (37)	3.7 (9.4)	0.0 (0.0)	0.0 (0.0)	1.8 (4.6)	17.2 (44)	59.3 (151)	90.6 (230)	463.1 (1,178)
Average extreme snow depth inches (cm)	92.0 (234)	106.4 (270)	121.1 (308)	113.4 (288)	89.3 (227)	42.5 (108)	4.3 (11)	0.0 (0.0)	1.4 (3.6)	10.7 (27)	32.0 (81)	66.0 (168)	124.3 (316)
Average precipitation days (≥ 0.01 in)	17.9	16.7	18.0	16.5	11.5	7.4	3.5	3.7	5.3	10.6	16.7	18.4	146.2
Average snowy days (≥ 0.1 in)	16.2	14.8	15.4	13.2	5.5	1.8	0.0	0.0	0.9	4.7	12.1	16.1	100.7
Mean monthly sunshine hours	124.0	141.3	217.0	240.0	310.0	330.0	372.0	341.0	270.0	217.0	90.0	93.0	2,745.3
Percentage possible sunshine	44	45	58	62	67	73	80	79	75	64	30	33	59
Average ultraviolet index	2	2	4	6	8	9	9	8	6	4	2	1	5
Source 1: NOAA
Source 2: Weather Atlas (sunshine data, UV index)

== Ecology ==
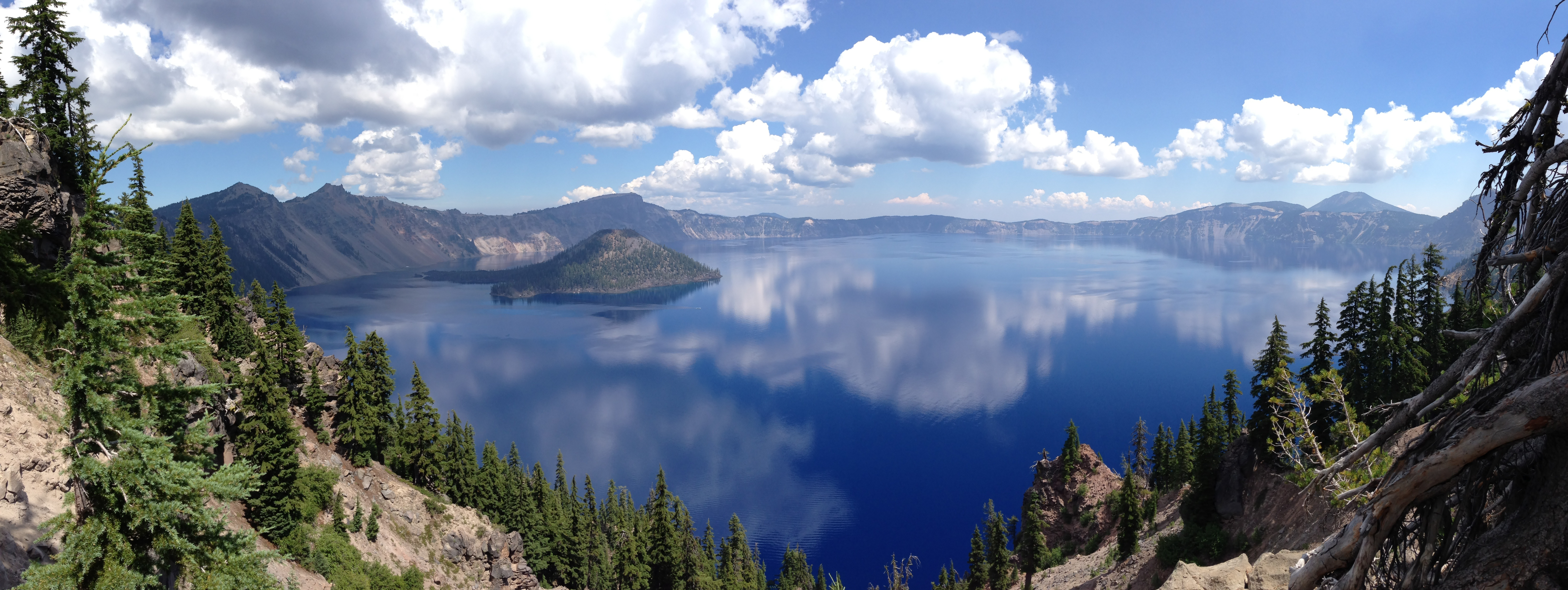
Panorama of Crater Lake and Wizard Island

Since the collapse of Mount Mazama due to a volcanic eruption formed Crater Lake, no fish inhabited the lake until William Gladstone Steel decided to stock it in 1888 to allow for fishing. Regular stocking continued until 1941, when it was evident that the fish could maintain a stable population without outside interference. Six species of fish were originally stocked, but only two species have survived: kokanee salmon and rainbow trout, with the former being the more plentiful. Fishing in Crater Lake is promoted because the fish species are not indigenous to the lake.

Crater Lake is also known for the "Old Man of the Lake", a full-sized tree which is now a log that has been bobbing vertically in the lake for over a century. The low temperature of the water has slowed the decomposition of the wood, hence its longevity.

In 1987, scientists sent a submersible down to the depths of Crater Lake to obtain more information about the geology at the bottom of the lake, and inspect moss samples found in moss beds as deep as 600 feet (180 m).

Due to several unique factors, mainly that the lake has no inlets or tributaries, the waters of Crater Lake are some of the purest in the world because of the absence of pollutants. Clarity readings from a Secchi disk have consistently been measured as being 120 ft (37 m), which is very clear for any natural body of water. In 1997, scientists recorded a record clarity of 142 ft (43 m). However, in 2025, scientists recorded a clarity of 78 ft (24 m), which means the lake's water is getting cloudier and may be an indication of issues with the lake's physics, chemistry, and ecology.

The lake has relatively high levels of dissolved salts, total alkalinity, and conductivity. The average pH has generally ranged between 7 and 8.

== Sacred significance ==
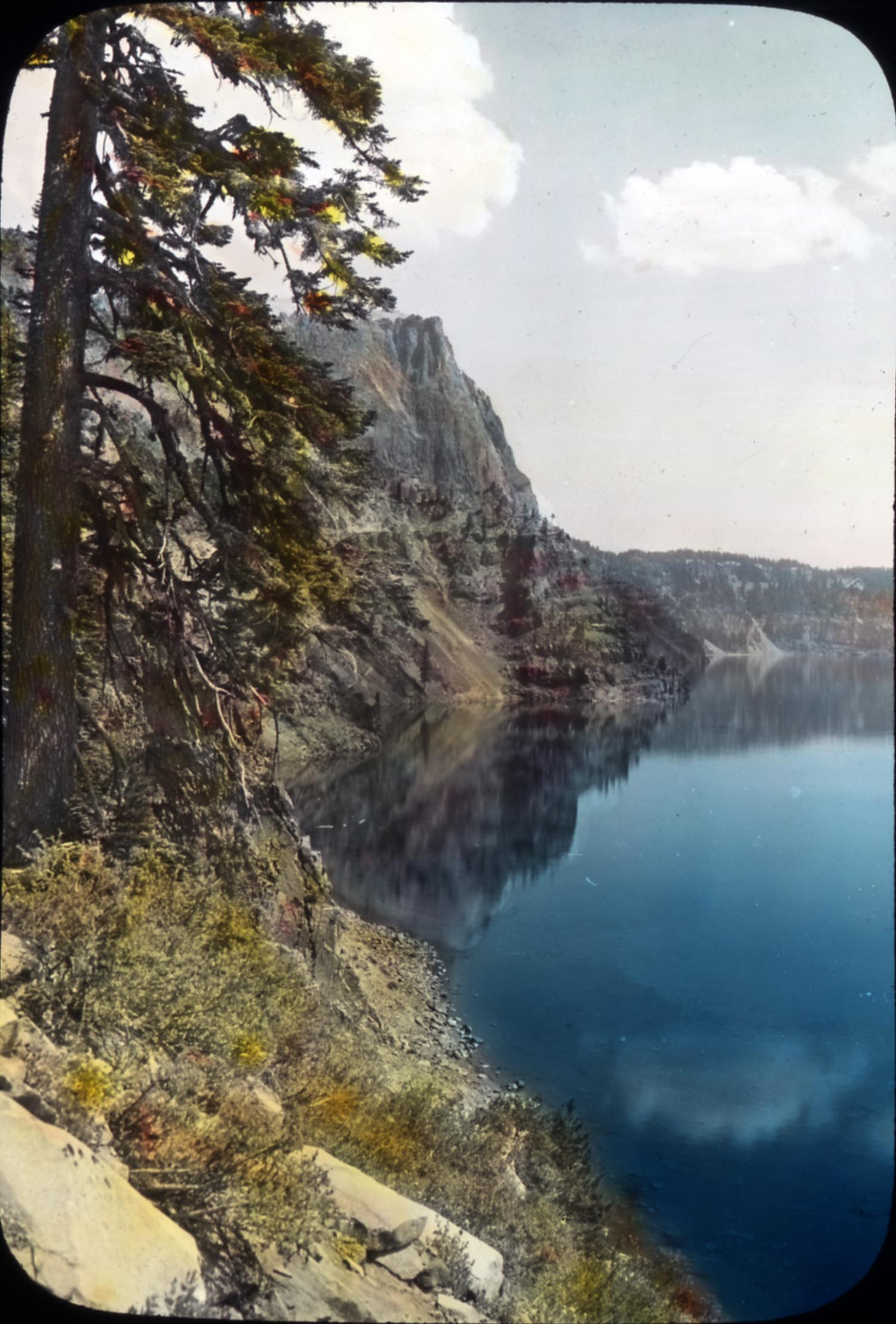
Llao Rock

The Klamath tribe of Native Americans, whose oral history describes their ancestors witnessing the collapse of Mount Mazama and the formation of Crater Lake, regard the lake as an "abode to the Great Spirit". Klamath oral history tells of a battle between the sky god Skell and the god of the underworld Llao (a prominent feature at Crater Lake is Llao Rock). Mount Mazama was destroyed in the battle, creating Crater Lake, called giiwas in the Klamath language. The Klamath people used Crater Lake in vision quests, which often involved climbing the caldera walls and other dangerous tasks. Those who were successful in such quests were often regarded as having more spiritual powers. The tribe still holds Crater Lake in high regard as a spiritual site.

== Recreation ==
Located 56 miles (90 km) north of the city of Klamath Falls and 62 miles (100 km) northeast of Medford, Crater Lake can be reached from U.S. Route 97 on the east, on the southwest by Highway 62, and on the northwest by Highway 138. Crater Lake and the remnants of Mount Mazama can be seen from Rim Drive, a 33-mile (53 km) road that surrounds the caldera, which is the only part within the Crater Lake National Park where vehicles are permitted. The Garfield Peak Trail, which runs 1.5 miles (2.4 km) east from the Crater Lake Lodge, offers views from 1,900 feet (580 m) above the lake's surface, with Mount Shasta visible 125 miles (201 km) southward. Another trail runs for 2.5 miles (4.0 km) from Rim Drive's eastern edge to Mount Scott, which offers views of central and southern Oregon such as the Three Sisters located 80 miles (130 km) north of Mazama and Mount Thielsen, also to the north. The Cleetwood Cove Trail leads for 1 mile (1.6 km) down the northern flank of the caldera rim, eventually reaching Cleetwood Cove where boat trips run from late June or early July throughout the summer season to Wizard Island. Wizard Island can be climbed, offering views of Crater Lake.

Swimming is permitted in Crater Lake, but the only legal and safe way to get to the shore is by following Cleetwood Cove Trail, and people can enter the water from there. Other activities include fishing and a 2-hour boat tour around the lake provided by a Park Ranger from Crater Lake National Park.

As of 2026, the Cleetwood Cove Trail and Marina are closed for a three-year National Park Service rehabilitation project. Accordingly, lakeshore access, swimming, and public boat tours are suspended through the 2028 summer season.

As the region lies within a national park area, collecting rocks within the vicinity is prohibited unless a permit is obtained. The park's facilities lie at Rim Village, at the southern edge of the caldera. Lodging and camping facilities open during the summer season between May and October. No lodges, gas stations, or camping areas remain open from October through late May. Popular activities within Crater Lake National Park include biking, fishing, cross-country skiing, and snowshoeing.

== See also ==
- List of lakes in Oregon
- Volcanic Legacy Scenic Byway
