= Wizard Island =

Volcanic cinder cone

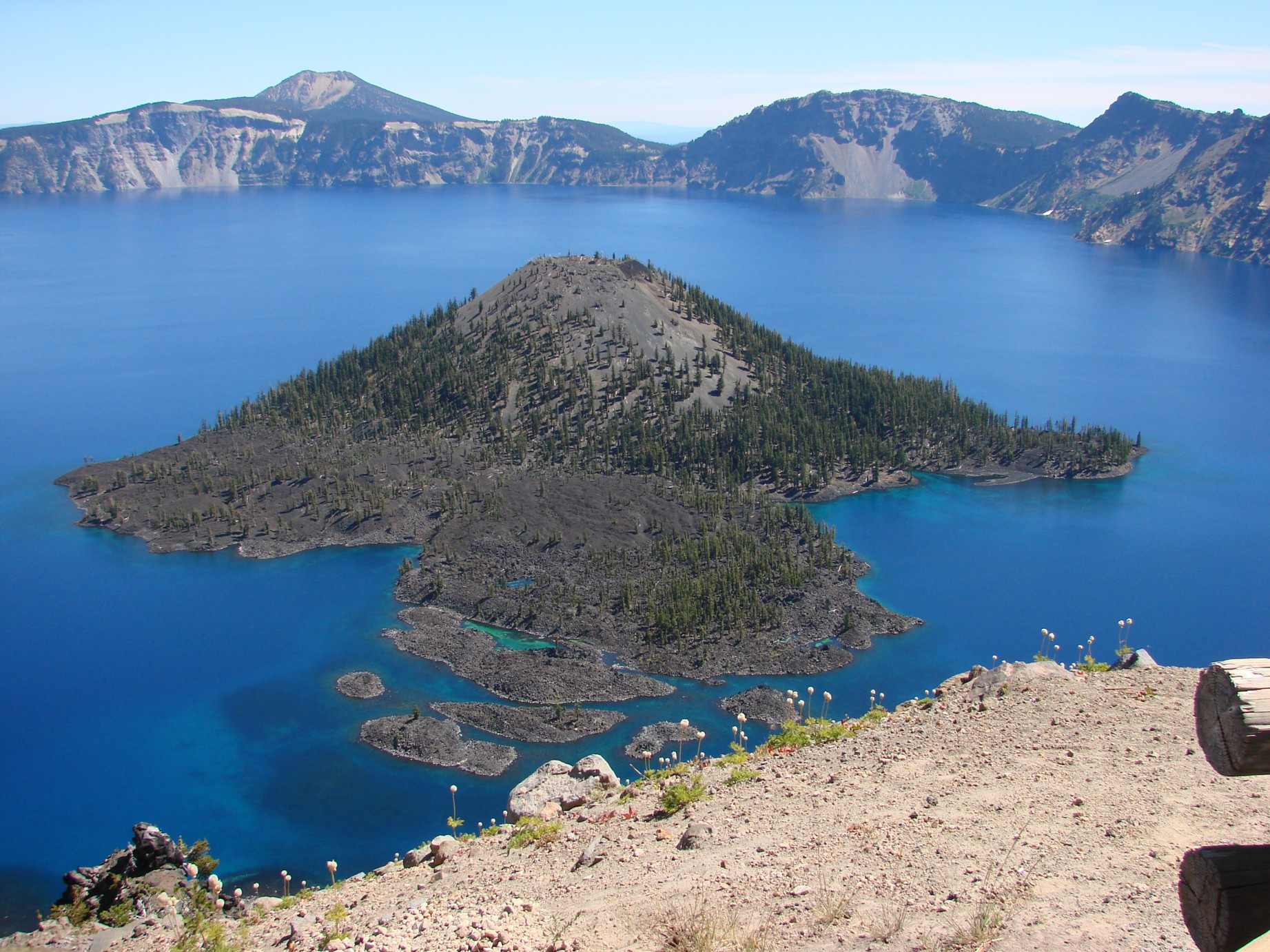

Highest point
- Elevation: 6,933 ft (2,113 m)
- Prominence: 755 ft (230 m)(varies with water level)
- Coordinates: 42°56′20″N 122°8′45″W

Geography
- Location: Klamath County, Oregon, U.S.
- Parent range: Cascades
- Topo map: USGS Crater Lake West

Geology
- Mountain type: Cinder cone
- Volcanic arc: Cascade Volcanic Arc
- Last eruption: About 4600 BC

Climbing
- Easiest route: Trail with boat access

Wizard Island is a volcanic cinder cone which forms an island at the west end of Crater Lake in Crater Lake National Park, Oregon. The top of the island reaches 6,933 feet (2,113 m) above sea level, about 755 feet (230 m) above the average surface of the lake.

The cone is capped by a volcanic crater about 500 feet (150 m) wide and 100 feet (30 m) deep. The crater was named the "Witches Cauldron" by William Gladstone Steel in 1885, who also gave Wizard Island its name at the same time. The land area of the island is 315.85 acres (127.82 ha).

== Formation ==
Wizard Island was created after Mount Mazama, a large complex volcano, erupted violently approximately 7,700 years ago, forming its caldera which now contains Crater Lake. Following the cataclysmic caldera-forming eruption, which left a hole about 4,000 feet (1,200 m) deep where the mountain had once stood, a series of smaller eruptions over the next several hundred years formed several cinder cones on the caldera floor. The highest of these cones, the only one to rise above the current lake level, is Wizard Island, which rises over 2,700 feet (820 m) above the lowest point on the caldera floor and the deepest point in the lake.

Another large cinder cone, Merriam Cone, is in the northeast part of the lake. Although Merriam Cone rises about 1,400 feet (430 m) above the caldera floor, its summit is still 505 feet (154 m) below the average lake level. Its surface features and lack of a crater indicate that Merriam Cone formed underwater.

== Access ==
Current public access to Wizard Island is available only during the summer months when boat tours on Crater Lake are in operation. The tours depart from Cleetwood Cove at the north end of the lake, and circle the lake in the counterclockwise direction, stopping at a dock at Governors Bay on the south side of Wizard Island.

Passengers on boat trips early in the day may choose to disembark on the island, but must be prepared to spend the entire day on the island if subsequent boats are too full to take on additional passengers. Those on late afternoon boat trips are not permitted to disembark. A final boat is dispatched at the end of each day to pick up any stragglers since overnight camping is not permitted on the island.

Two hiking trails are available on Wizard Island, one of which switchbacks up the flanks of the cone and circles the crater on top while the other trail meanders from the dock towards the western end of the island.

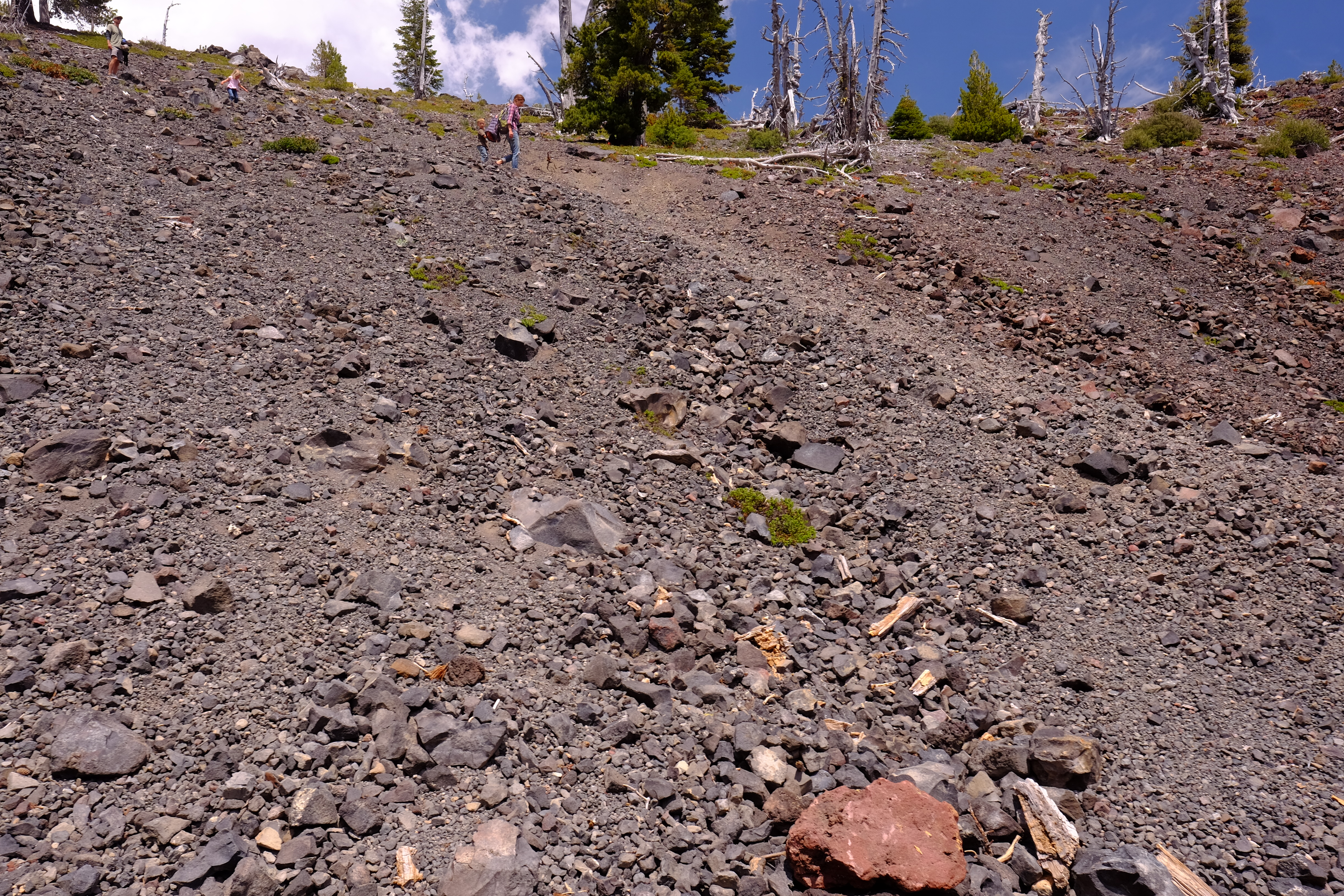
Looking up out of the crater of Wizard Island from the bottom

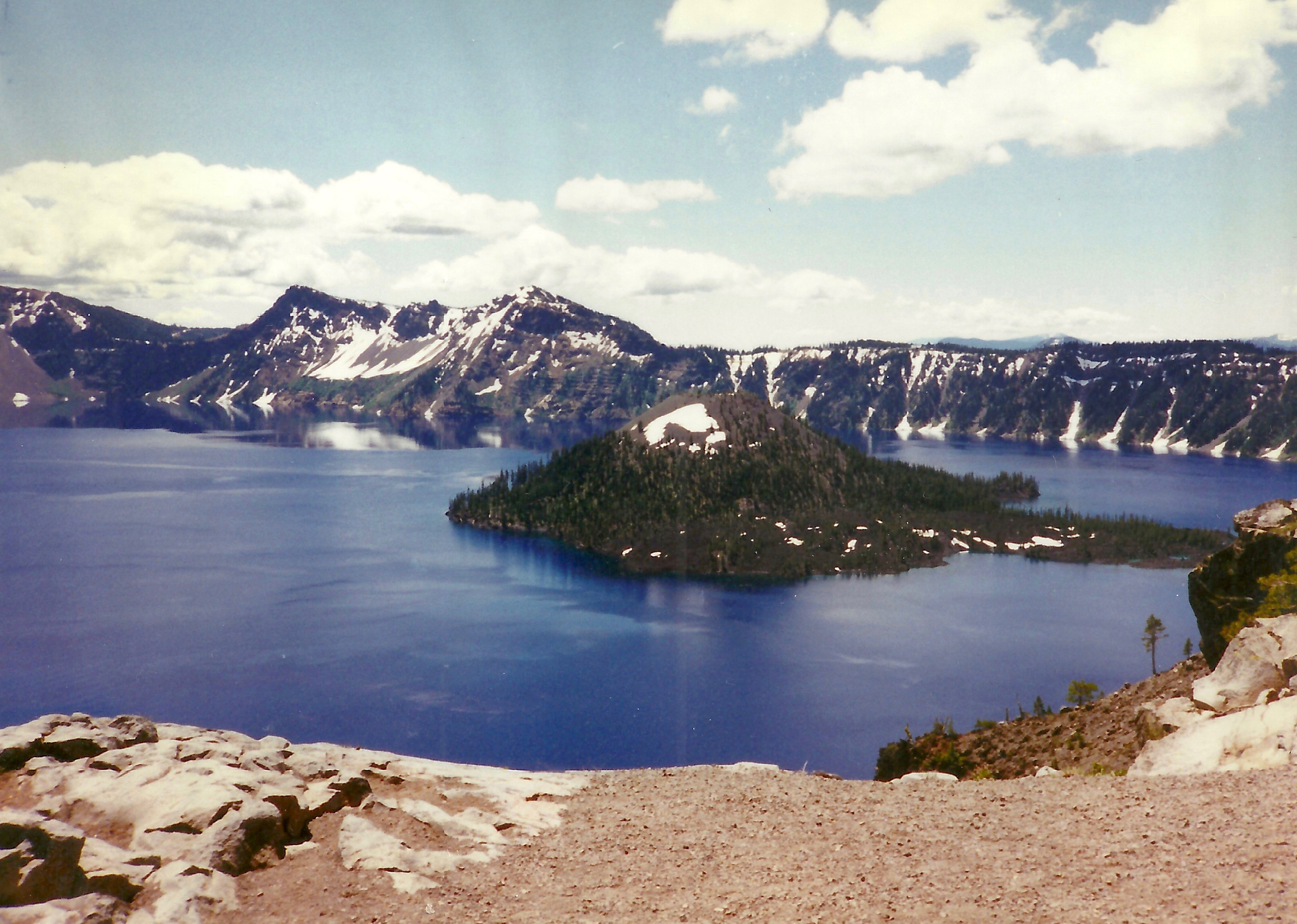
Crater Lake and Wizard Island in 1997

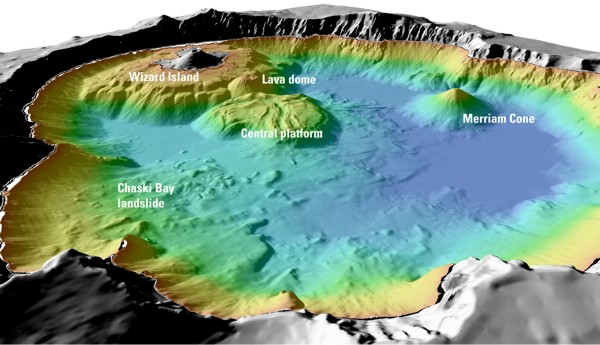
Crater Lake bathymetry survey showing Wizard Island and Merriam Cone

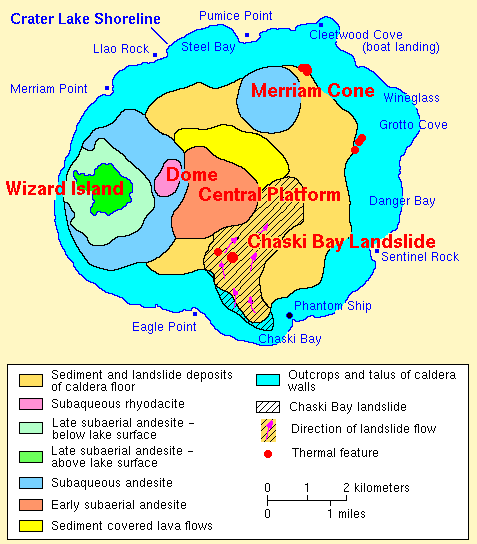
Geologic map of Wizard Island and the lake floor

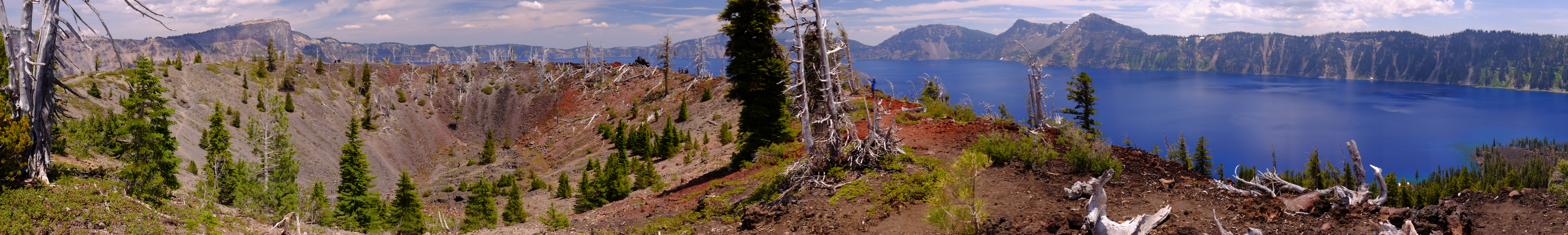
Panoramic view of the volcanic crater of Wizard Island, seen from the rim
