= List of historic buildings in Klamath Falls, Oregon =

This is a list of historic buildings in Klamath Falls, Oregon, many of which are located downtown.

== Nineteenth century ==
Building	Year Completed	Builder	Style	Image
Judge Henry L. Benson House, added to the National Register of Historic Places on December 2, 1981.	1892		Octagon house with Queen Anne Style Finnish	

== 1900-1910 ==
Building	Year Completed	Builder	Style	Image
Baldwin Hotel-Museum, added to the National Register of Historic Places on October 2, 1973.	1905	George T. Baldwin		
Fred Goeller House, also known as Goeller-Caillouette House. Added to the National Register of Historic Places on June 3, 1998. As of 2013, the Goeller House has fallen into a state of disrepair.	1900–1905	John Fred Goeller	Queen Anne style reformed by Eastlake movement	
Williams Building	1927	Herman Winters	Italian Renaissance	
Richardson–Ulrich House	1908		American Craftsman Bungalow	

== 1911-1919 ==
Building	Year Completed	Builder	Style	Image
Blackburn Sanitarium, added to the National Register of Historic Places on September 27, 1996.	1912			
Klamath County Museum, formerly the Klamath County Armory & Auditorium	1935			
Klamath Falls City Hall, added to the National Register of Historic Places on October 30, 1989.	1914			
Courthouse annex, formally known as Elk's Temple	1915	Klamath Falls Elks	Colonial Revival	
Arcade Hotel	1919	Christos Blanas	Chicago Style	

== 1920-1929 ==
Building	Year Completed	Builder	Style	Image
Hotel Earley, also known as Collins Building and later as Hall Hotel Annex	1920		Italian Renaissance	
Warren Mills House	1920			
Crater Rooms Hotel	1924	B. L. Barkley		
Bisbee Hotel, added to the National Register of Historic Places on October 12, 2006.	1926			
Hotel Cascade, also known as the Arcade Apartments	1926	Christos Blanas	Greek Revival	
Ewauna Apartments, originally known as Arcade Garage	1926	Christos Blanas		
Klamath Falls City Hall, formerly known as Old Klamath Falls City Library	1926			
Willard Hotel, also known as Lake Park Towers	1858 (Source: Bogatay Construction, Building Owner)	Willard D. Miller	Mission architecture	
Balsiger Building	1929		Egyptian revival	

== 1930-1939 ==
Building	Year Completed	Builder	Style	Image
Oregon Bank Building, also known as Medical-Dental Building	1930		Gothic	
First National Bank Building	1930		Gothic	
Winema Apartments, also known as Hotel Elk	1930			
U.S. National Bank	1937		Modern architecture	

== 1940-1949 ==
Building	Year Completed	Builder	Style	Notes
Ross Ragland Theater, formerly known Art Deco Esquire Theater	1940		Art Deco	
Valley Hospital, listed on the NRHP in Oregon	1941			

== Dates Unknown ==
Building	Year Completed	Builder	Style	Image
1888 County Court House, purchased for $3,500 and previously a school or rented commercial premises that in 1888 housed county offices.	Unknown			
Anchor Hotel	1927	Sydney Darling		

== Demolished ==
Building	Year Completed	Builder	Style	Image
Melhase building, demolished 2014.	1905			
Winthrow-Melhase Block, also known as Stevens Hotel. Destroyed after the 1993 Klamath Falls earthquakes damage.	1906	George W. Brooks	Italianate	
Hot Springs Courthouse, torn down in 1927, after a succession of lawsuits, to make way for Klamath Union High School.	1913		Along Grecian architectural lines	
Klamath Falls Carnegie Library, opened 1914–1928, then used as high school library until 1957.	1913			
Main Street Courthouse, destroyed after the 1993 Klamath Falls earthquakes damage.	1918			
White Pelican Hotel, burned in October, 1926. The site is now the location of the Balsiger Building				

== See also ==
- National Register of Historic Places listings in Klamath County, Oregon
