= National Register of Historic Places listings in Klamath County, Oregon =

Location of Klamath County in Oregon

This list presents the full set of buildings, structures, objects, sites, or districts designated on the National Register of Historic Places in Klamath County, Oregon, United States, and offers brief descriptive information about each of them. The National Register recognizes places of national, state, or local historic significance across the United States. Out of over 90,000 National Register sites nationwide, Oregon is home to over 2,000, and 30 of those are found partially or wholly in Klamath County.

This National Park Service list is complete through NPS recent listings posted May 30, 2025.

== Current listings ==
	Name on the Register	Image	Date listed	Location	City or town	Description
1	Army Corps of Engineers Road System	Army Corps of Engineers Road System	August 12, 2019 (#100004255)	Roughly parallel to Rim Drive and Pinnacles Road; 42°52′48″N 122°02′16″W	Crater Lake National Park	
2	Baldwin Hotel	Baldwin Hotel	October 2, 1973 (#73001576)	31 Main St. 42°13′14″N 121°47′12″W	Klamath Falls	
3	Judge Henry L. Benson House	Judge Henry L. Benson House	December 2, 1981 (#81000496)	137 High St. 42°13′25″N 121°47′07″W	Klamath Falls	
4	Bisbee Hotel	Bisbee Hotel	October 12, 2006 (#06000938)	229 S. 6th St. 42°13′27″N 121°46′47″W	Klamath Falls	
5	Blackburn Sanitarium	Blackburn Sanitarium	September 27, 1996 (#96001046)	1842 Esplanade Avenue; 42°13′58″N 121°46′25″W	Klamath Falls	
6	Bly Ranger Station	Bly Ranger Station	March 11, 1981 (#81000650)	Highway 140; 42°24′03″N 121°02′41″W	Bly	
7	Comfort Station No. 68	Comfort Station No. 68	December 1, 1988 (#88002624)	Rim Dr., near Rim Village Campground; 42°54′42″N 122°08′44″W	Crater Lake National Park	
8	Comfort Station No. 72	Comfort Station No. 72	December 1, 1988 (#88002625)	Rim Dr., in Rim Village Campground; 42°54′41″N 122°08′50″W	Crater Lake National Park	
9	Crater Lake Lodge	Crater Lake Lodge	May 5, 1981 (#81000096)	Crater Lake National Park; 42°54′36″N 122°08′22″W	Crater Lake National Park	
10	Crater Lake Superintendent's Residence	Crater Lake Superintendent's Residence	May 28, 1987 (#87001347)	Munson Valley; 42°54′03″N 122°08′12″W	Crater Lake National Park	The 1930s-era Munson Valley development was originally one of the best-designed rustic installations in a U.S. national park. This is the only building in the group to remain in near-original condition, and it employed unusual construction methods in response to the very short Crater Lake building season.
11	Fort Klamath Site	Fort Klamath Site	October 7, 1971 (#71000680)	SE of Fort Klamath; 42°41′31″N 121°58′20″W	Fort Klamath	
12	Fred Goeller House	Fred Goeller House	June 3, 1998 (#98000624)	234 Riverside Dr. 42°13′03″N 121°47′29″W	Klamath Falls	As of 2013, the Goeller House has fallen into a state of disrepair.
13	Honeymoon Creek Snow-Survey Cabin	Honeymoon Creek Snow-Survey Cabin	December 29, 2000 (#00000515)	Sky Lakes Wilderness; 42°40′01″N 122°11′54″W	Ashland vicinity	
14	Jacksonville-to-Fort Klamath Military Wagon Road	Jacksonville-to-Fort Klamath Military Wagon Road	May 16, 1979 (#79002068)	S of Butte Falls; 42°28′46″N 122°26′57″W	Butte Falls vicinity	
15	Klamath County Armory and Auditorium	Klamath County Armory and Auditorium	May 18, 2011 (#11000295)	1451 Main St. 42°13′42″N 121°46′29″W	Klamath Falls	
16	Klamath Falls City Hall	Klamath Falls City Hall	October 30, 1989 (#89001861)	226 S. 5th St. 42°13′24″N 121°46′51″W	Klamath Falls	
17	Old Klamath Falls City Library	Old Klamath Falls City Library	October 30, 1989 (#89001863)	500 Klamath Ave. 42°13′25″N 121°46′51″W	Klamath Falls	
18	Lake of the Woods Ranger Station – Work Center	Lake of the Woods Ranger Station – Work Center	April 8, 1986 (#86000845)	Winema National Forest; 42°23′09″N 122°13′34″W	Klamath Falls vicinity	
19	Linkville Pioneer Cemetery	Linkville Pioneer Cemetery	July 11, 2014 (#14000400)	Corner of Lexington Avenue and Upham Street; 42°14′02″N 121°46′58″W	Klamath Falls	
20	Lower Klamath National Wildlife Refuge	Lower Klamath National Wildlife Refuge	October 15, 1966 (#66000238)	Lower Klamath Lake, east of Dorris, California (See also Siskiyou County, California.); 41°56′48″N 121°39′53″W	Worden	This national wildlife refuge, established in 1908, was the first large block of public land set aside for wildlife management purposes. Because of its origins in the Klamath Basin reclamation project, it became an ongoing example of the tensions between conservation and commercial demands in public land management.
21	Warren Mills House	Warren Mills House	February 11, 1993 (#93000016)	123 High St. 42°13′22″N 121°47′17″W	Klamath Falls	
22	Munson Valley Historic District	Munson Valley Historic District	December 1, 1988 (#88002622)	Munson Valley Rd. 42°53′52″N 122°08′04″W	Crater Lake National Park	
23	Oregon Bank Building	Oregon Bank Building	September 10, 1987 (#87001525)	905 Main St. 42°13′38″N 121°46′45″W	Klamath Falls	
24	Point Comfort Lodge	Point Comfort Lodge	December 31, 1979 (#79002080)	27505 Rocky Point Rd. 42°28′18″N 122°05′24″W	Rocky Point	
25	Richardson–Ulrich House	Richardson–Ulrich House	August 11, 1988 (#88001244)	636 Conger Ave. 42°13′24″N 121°47′40″W	Klamath Falls	
26	Rim Drive Historic District	Rim Drive Historic District	January 30, 2008 (#08000041)	Rim Drive along edge of caldera surrounding Crater Lake; 42°57′24″N 122°02′49″W	Crater Lake National Park	
27	Rim Village Historic District	Rim Village Historic District	September 18, 1997 (#97001155)	Jct. of Rim Village Rd. and an access rd. 42°54′37″N 122°08′33″W	Crater Lake National Park	
28	Sinnott Memorial Building No. 67	Sinnott Memorial Building No. 67	December 1, 1988 (#88002623)	Rim Dr., near Rim Village Campground; 42°54′42″N 122°08′33″W	Crater Lake National Park	
29	Valley Hospital	Valley Hospital	September 8, 1988 (#88001524)	405 Pine St. 42°13′27″N 121°47′06″W	Klamath Falls	
30	Watchman Lookout Station No. 168	Watchman Lookout Station No. 168	December 1, 1988 (#88002626)	Off Rim Dr. on The Watchman; 42°56′35″N 122°10′21″W	Crater Lake National Park	

== Former listings ==
	Name on the Register	Image	Date listed	Date removed	Location	City or town	Description
1	Winthrow-Melhase Block		June 14, 1982 (#82003730)	December 28, 1994	4th and Main Sts.	Klamath Falls	Severely damaged by an earthquake on September 20, 1993.

== See also ==
- National Register of Historic Places listings in Oregon
- Listings in neighboring counties: Deschutes, Douglas, Jackson, Lake, Lane, Modoc, Siskiyou
- List of National Historic Landmarks in Oregon
- Historic preservation
- History of Oregon
- Lists of Oregon-related topics
