= Honeymoon Creek Snow-Survey Cabin =

- U.S. National Register of Historic Places
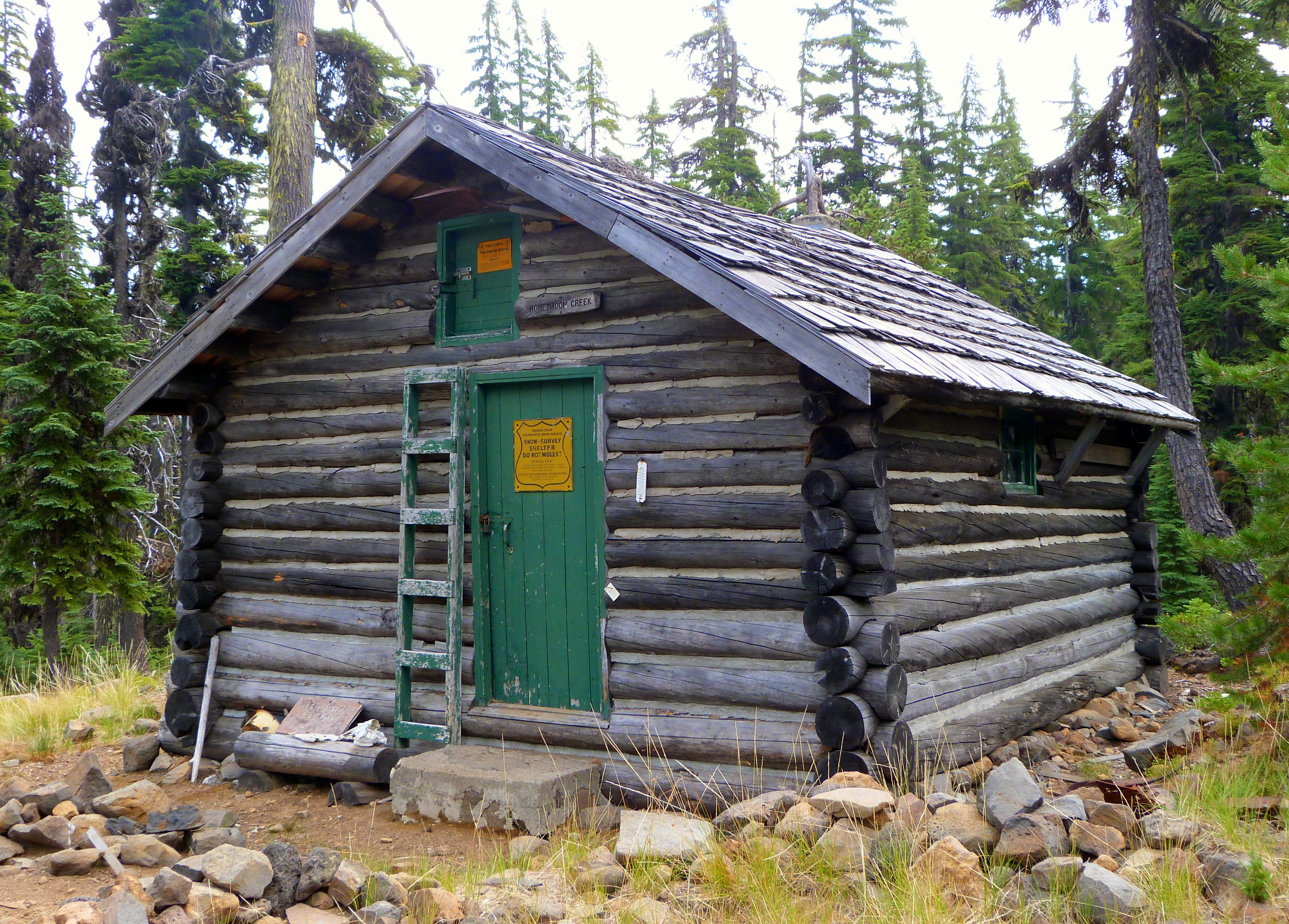
- The cabin's exterior in 2016

- Location within Oregon Location within the United States
- Nearest city: Ashland, Oregon
- Coordinates: 42°40′01″N 122°11′54″W
- Built: 1943
- Architect: Work, R.A.; et al.
- Architectural style: Late 19th and Early 20th Century American Movements, Log cabin
- MPS: US Forest Service Historic Structures on the Rogue River National Forest MPS
- NRHP reference No.: 00000515
- Added to NRHP: December 29, 2000

Honeymoon Creek Snow-Survey Cabin, also known as Seven Lakes Cabin, near Ashland, Oregon, was built in 1943. It was listed on the National Register of Historic Places in 2000.

It was deemed significant for its association with the Bureau of Agricultural Engineering/Soil Conservation Service's snow-survey program in southwestern Oregon. The cabin was not part of the first period of SCS snow-survey cabin construction in the 1930s, but it was built in the same design and by the same persons as built the first such cabin at South Lake.

The Honeymoon Creek Snow-Survey Cabin is located in the Butte Falls Ranger District, in Klamath County. The Whaleback Snow-Survey Cabin (1937), in the Prospect Ranger District in Douglas County, is also NRHP-listed.

== See also ==
- National Register of Historic Places listings in Klamath County, Oregon
