= Penn Mutual =

Mutual life insurance company

Coordinates: 39.9474°N 75.1505°W

Penn Mutual Life Insurance Company
- Type: Mutual
- Industry: Life Insurance and Annuities
- Founded: 1847; 179 years ago
- Headquarters: Horsham, Pennsylvania, United States
- Key people: David O'Malley, President and CEO
- Revenue: $3.7 billion USD (2019)
- Net income: $396 million USD (2019)
- Total assets: $36.7 billion USD (2019)
- Number of employees: 3,140 (2019)
- Website: www.pennmutual.com

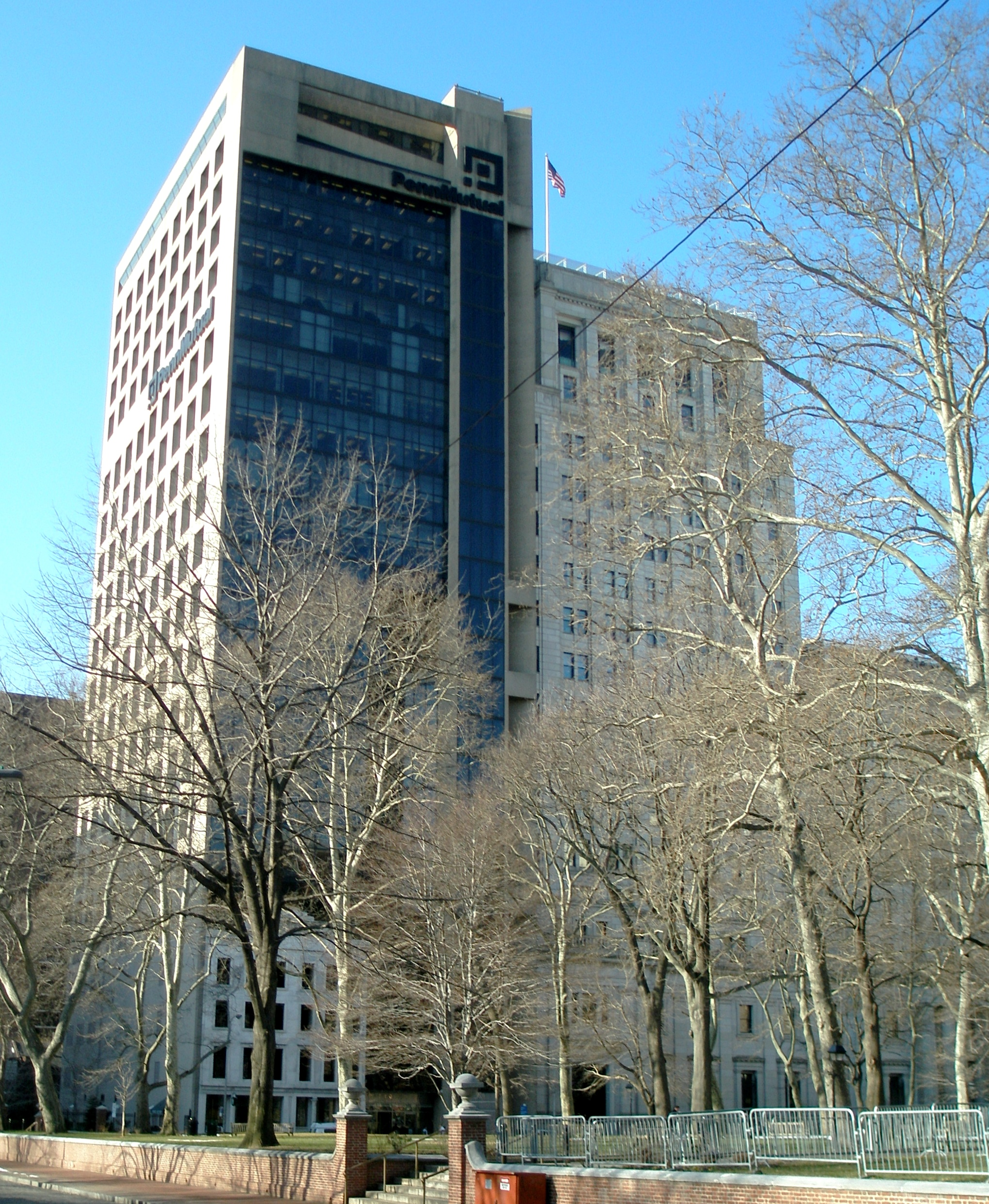
The Penn Mutual Tower (1975, left), 1931 addition (center), and 1913 headquarters building (right, hidden behind trees)

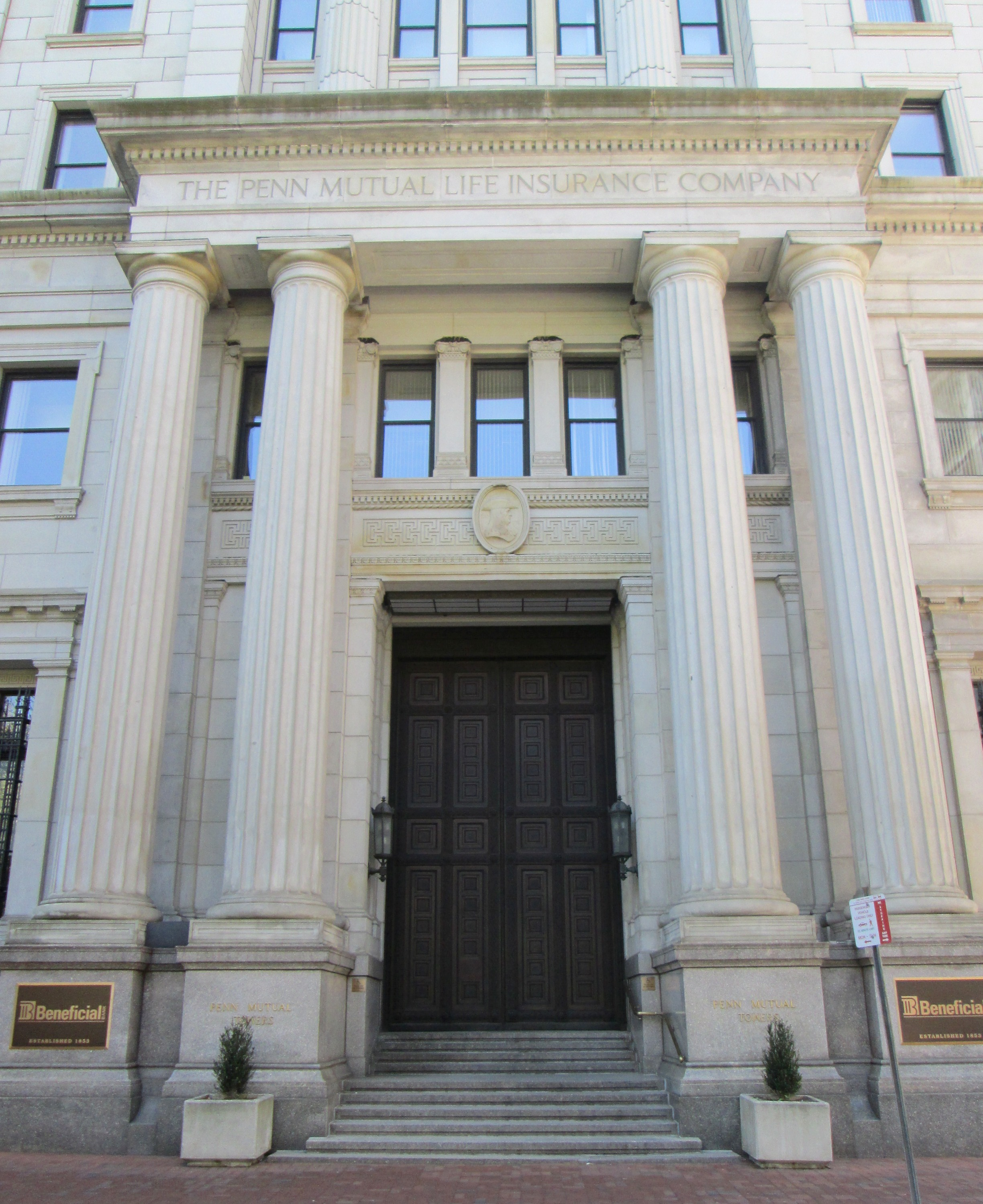
Penn Mutual entrance

The Penn Mutual Life Insurance Company, commonly referred to as Penn Mutual, was founded in Philadelphia, Pennsylvania, in 1847. It was the seventh mutual life insurance company chartered in the United States. As of 2019, it had 3,140 employees, $3.7 billion in revenue, and $36.7 billion in assets.

Penn Mutual is headquartered in Horsham, Pennsylvania, just outside Philadelphia.

In 2024, Penn Mutual announced that the Penn Mutual Board of Trustees approved a record $265 million dividend award in 2025 to participating policyholders. Dividends are a key measure of a mutual company’s performance, and Penn Mutual's dividend history remains one of the strongest and most consistent in the industry. Concurrently, after 42 years, Penn Mutual sold its investment advisory division, Janney Montgomery Scott, to funds managed by private equity firm KKR & Co.

== Buildings ==
Penn Mutual's original Philadelphia headquarters was erected in 1850–51 to designs by architect Gordon Parker Cummings, at the northeast corner of Third and Dock. The five-story building was the "first cast-iron building in Philadelphia, and one of the earliest cast-iron buildings in the nation." It was razed in 1956.

In 1860 the company moved into an existing building at 921–23 Chestnut that dated from 1810. In February 1889 the company moved out, temporarily, so that property could be cleared to prepare for a new edifice "to be as high as the Record cupola", the conspicuously tall Philadelphia Record tower standing immediately adjacent on Chestnut. "The new building will have a front of 77 feet on Chestnut street and will be nine stories in height, with a tower 17 feet square, which will reach to a height of 175 feet." The architect was Theophilus P. Chandler Jr. (That 1889 building, with its subsequent additions, was ultimately destroyed and replaced by Paul Cret's Old Federal Reserve Bank Building in 1931.)

In 1916 Penn Mutual moved to an entirely new headquarters designed by Edgar Viguers Seeler, at the corner of Walnut and 6th Street. The 1916 building still stands. In 1931 the growing company built an equally boxy addition next door along Walnut, to the east, although the addition by architect Ernst J. Matthewson towered over the original with twenty stories of granite.

Then in 1971–75, the company dramatically expanded its floorspace again at the same site. The architects were Mitchell/Giurgola. Their Penn Mutual Tower project encompassed a third, higher modernist glass tower, the preservation and integration of the 1916 structure and the 1931 structure, and a move further east along Walnut which incorporated another unrelated historic property—but only as a facade, a freestanding scrim. That building had its own history as the Pennsylvania Fire Insurance Company Building, 508–10 Walnut Street, designed by John Haviland in 1838 originally with four stories, three bays, and the winged suns and papyrus-leaf-column decorations of Egyptian Revival. These three bays had been duplicated, and the cornice constructed, by Theophilus P. Chandler Jr. in 1902. The tower won an American Institute of Architects Honor Award in 1977.

== See also ==
- Mutual Life Insurance Company
