= List of National Natural Landmarks in Oregon =

There are 11 National Natural Landmarks in the U.S. state of Oregon.

Oregon National Natural Landmarks (clickable map)

| Name | Image | Date | Location | County | Ownership | Description |
|---|---|---|---|---|---|---|
| Crown Point | Crown Point | 1971 | 45.5395°N 122.24422°W | Multnomah | state park | Promontory in Columbia Gorge |
| Fort Rock State Monument | Fort Rock | 1976 | 43.372°N 121.074°W | Lake | state park | Volcanic tuff ring |
| Horse Ridge Natural Area | Horse Ridge | 1967 | 43.924°N 121.039°W | Deschutes | federal | Western juniper woodland on Bureau of Land Management property. |
| John Day Fossil Beds | | 1966 | 44.555833°N 119.645278°W | Grant | federal | Contains a remarkable sequence of very diverse fossils. |
| The Island | | 2011 | 44.558489°N 121.277143°W | Jefferson | federal | Native juniper savanna on an isolated plateau at the confluence of the Deschutes and Crooked Rivers. Part of Ochoco National Forest. |
| Lawrence Memorial Grassland Preserve | | 1984 | 44.950889°N 120.7988834°W | Oregon | private | An excellent illustration of "biscuit and scabland" topography. |
| Newberry Crater | Newberry Caldera | 1976 | 43.689194°N 121.254889°W | Deschutes | federal | Atypical shield volcano in Deschutes National Forest. |
| Mount Howard-East Peak | North side of Mount Howard | 2016 | 45.260987°N 117.178778°W | Wallowa | federal | Contains botanically diverse montane grassland habitats and populations of endemic and rare plant species. |
| Round Top Butte | | 2011 | 42.5277551°N 122.68381°W | Jackson | federal | Exceptional native bunchgrass habitat. Located on Bureau of Land Management land. |
| Willamette Floodplain | Grassland of the Willamette Floodplain | 1987 | 44.364°N 123.23°W | Benton, Lane, Linn, Marion, Polk | federal | A bottomland interior valley grassland floodplain. Part of William L. Finley National Wildlife Refuge. |
| Zumwalt Prairie | | 2013 | 45.54°N 117.09°W | Wallowa | private | Largest contiguous remaining tract of bunchgrass prairie in the nation. |

== See also ==
- List of National Historic Landmarks in Oregon
