= Sunken Village Archeological Site =

- Sunken Village Archeological Site (35MU4)
- U.S. National Register of Historic Places
- U.S. National Historic Landmark
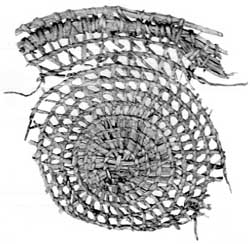
- Basketry fragment recovered from the site
- Location: Address restricted
- Nearest city: Portland, Oregon
- NRHP reference No.: 89002455

Significant dates
- Added to NRHP: December 20, 1989
- Designated NHL: December 20, 1989

The Sunken Village Archeological Site, designated by the Smithsonian trinomial 35MU4, is an archaeological site on Sauvie Island in Multnomah County, Oregon, United States. The site consists of a remarkably well-preserved Chinookan village, dating back more than 700 years. It is a major example of a wet archaeological site, in which cultural materials were preserved in an anaerobic freshwater environment. Finds at the site include well-preserved basketry. The site was declared a National Historic Landmark in 1989.

One of the site's unusual features is a series of pits that were apparently used for leaching tannin from acorns. These pits, as well as associated features, including basketry weave patterns, bear resemblance to finds at other sites on the Pacific coast of North America, and in Japan, representing a rare direct connection between North American and Asian cultures.

The site has been a site of interest to amateur collectors since at least the early 20th century, and came under further threat in the late 20th century by seepage from a nearby levee. It was also threatened in 2008 by potential engineering work that may damage the site, in order to support an earthen dam.

== See also ==
- List of National Historic Landmarks in Oregon
- National Register of Historic Places listings in Multnomah County, Oregon
