= Winthrow-Melhase Block =

- Formerly listed on the U.S. National Register of Historic Places
- Location within Oregon Location within the United States
- Location: 4th and Main streets, Klamath Falls, Oregon
- Coordinates: 42°13′26″N 121°46′59″W
- Built: 1906
- Architect: George W. Brooks
- Architectural style: Italianate
- NRHP reference No.: 82003730

Significant dates
- Added to NRHP: June 14, 1982
- Removed from NRHP: December 28, 1994

Winthrow-Melhase Block, also known as Stevens Hotel, was built in 1906 in Klamath Falls, Oregon. It was listed on the National Register of Historic Places in 1982. The building was severely damaged by the 1993 Klamath Falls earthquakes, and was subsequently demolished.

George W. Brooks was the architect.

== See also ==
- List of historic buildings in Klamath Falls, Oregon
