= Baldwin Hotel =

- U.S. National Register of Historic Places
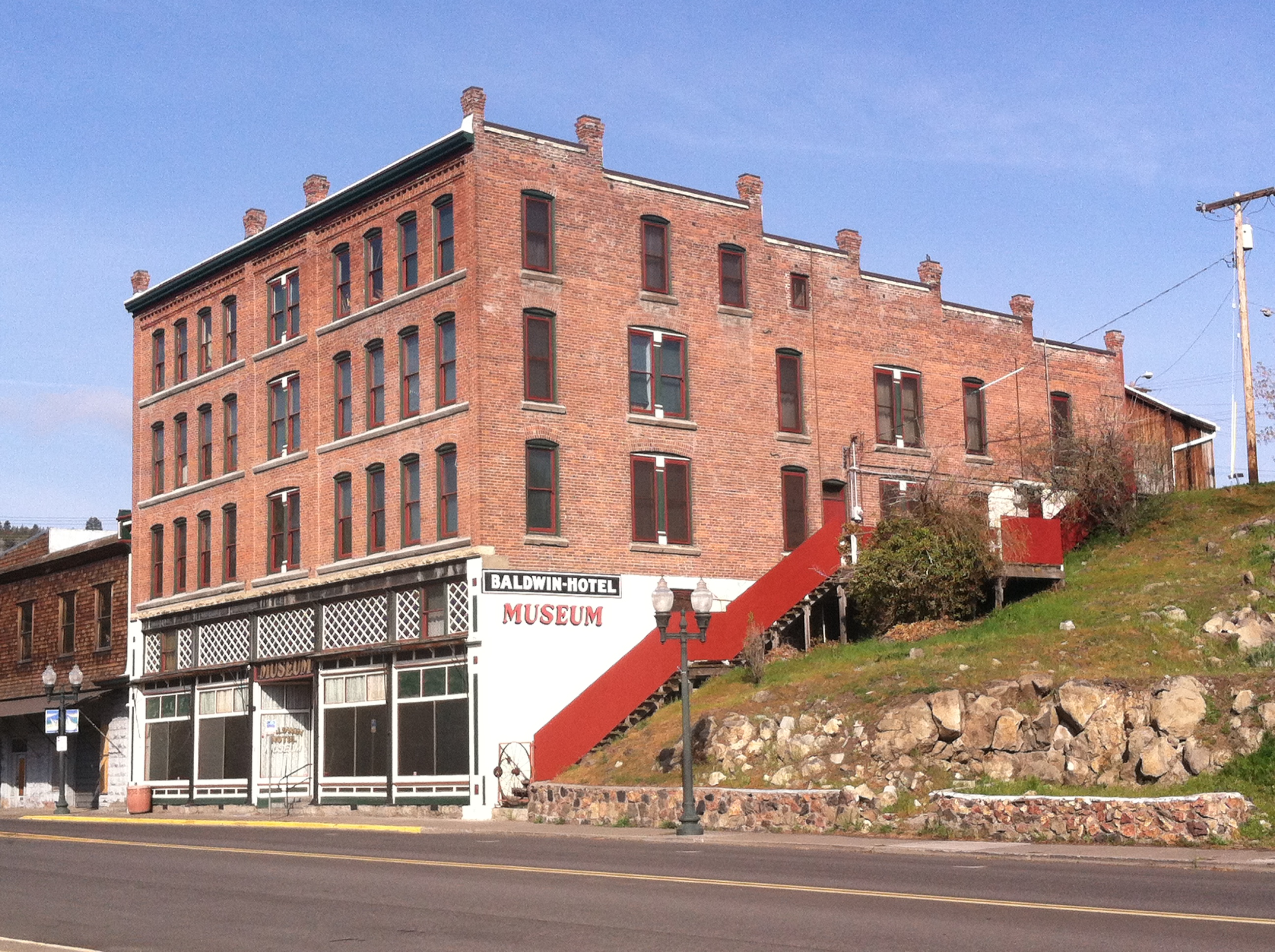

- Location within Oregon Location within the United States
- Location: 31 Main Street; Klamath Falls, Oregon
- Coordinates: 42°13′14″N 121°47′12″W
- Area: 0.2 acres (0.081 ha)
- Built: 1905
- NRHP reference No.: 73001576
- Added to NRHP: October 2, 1973

The Baldwin Hotel is a historic hotel building in Klamath Falls, Oregon, in the United States. It was built in 1905 and added to the National Register of Historic Places on October 2, 1973. Originally built to be a hardware store by George Baldwin, the building was converted into a hotel in 1911 as George saw the potential profit from the railroad coming to town. He anticipated the railroad to come by the Link River, across the street from the building's location. Unfortunately for George, the railroad was instead built at the other end of Main Street, by the current Klamath County Museum. Nonetheless, the hotel was built and operated with unique characteristics. As the site of construction was a rocky hillside, the building was constructed by carving away the basalt and creating an incredibly sturdy foundation. This hotel has almost all rooms connected in order to create the ability to rent out either one room, or an entire suite of rooms. George's thinking behind this was that people would want to be able to have an office and apartment all connected. It also was the first building to have indoor plumbing in every room, even though running water wasn't available until 1908.

== History ==
The Baldwin family consisted of George and Josephine Baldwin, and their children. They started a family and had their firstborn George, who died at the age of three. Their next child was Maud Baldwin, born in 1878, who became a prominent businesswoman and photographer. Three boys followed Charles, William, and Floyd (Zim), who became businessmen, owning and operating a mining operation, a hardware store, and an automobile dealership, respectively. George's later life found him in a senatorial seat from 1917 until his death in 1920. Leaving behind his unmarried daughter to care for her ailing mother and the hotel proved to be too much of a strain for Maud, who committed suicide in 1926 by drowning her self in the nearby lake. Before her death, Maud sold the hotel to a couple in 1923.

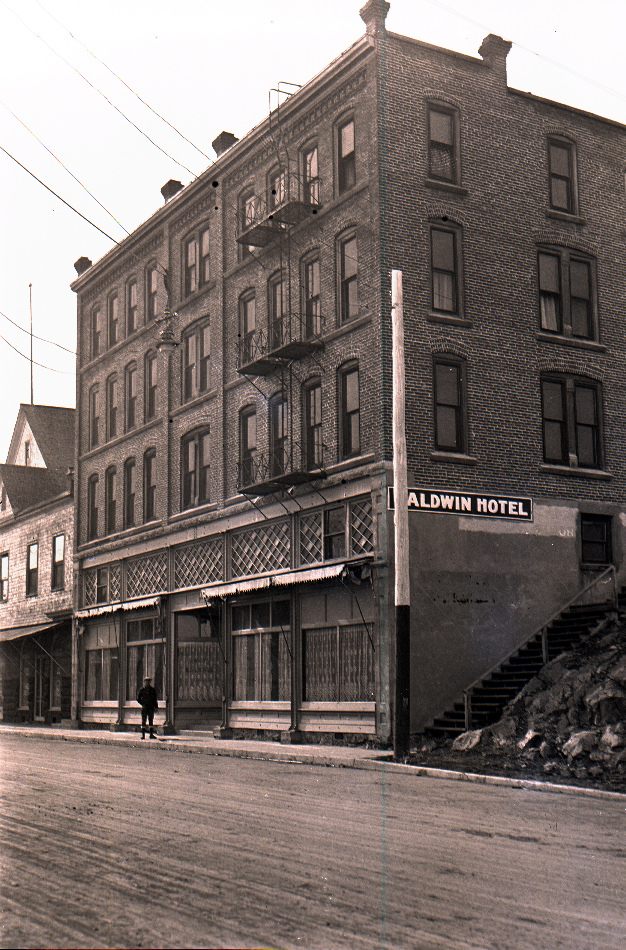
The hotel in 1922

This couple, Andrew and Cordelia Moore operated the hotel until 1951 when they retired and gave the hotel to their daughter Vera Moore Jones and her husband, Mart Jones. The hotel in its later years operated as a residence hotel serving many elderly gentlemen, including Herbert Ballard, who lived in the same room of the hotel for 51 years. Ballard was an Englishman who worked as an accountant for the many (at the time) lumber companies in the area. His duration at the Baldwin made him the only resident to have lived there under all three sets of owners and he was informally adopted, spending his holidays with the Jones'. The Jones' era came to a close in 1971 due to the hotel falling into disrepair and the financial trouble of getting up to date on the fire code; ultimately, the hotel was forced to close.

The destruction of the hotel was imminent until a group of concerned citizens came together and forced a reconsideration for the property. This led to Klamath County buying the property and all of its contents, including the original brass beds, dressers, claw foot tubs and other items from the long history of the building and its inhabitants. The conversion was considerably helped by former County Commissioner, Nell Kuonen to whom the Museum owes its gratitude.

The hotel is now operated as a museum by Klamath County Museums, and is open from Memorial Day weekend through Labor Day weekend, and during the Halloween season for special reservation-only tours. One- and two-hour tours are offered, showcasing all four floors of the hotel and examining the history of the building and Klamath Falls. Using its collection of items donated over the years, the museum is able to show a historical insight into many different topics, such as sporting in the great outdoors, child care, fashion, laundry, Victorian ideals, cooking, music, shopping, healthcare and a collection of movie theatre memorabilia as owned by the Moore's and the Jones' who also operated theatres in Bly, Oregon and Dorris, California.

== See also ==
- National Register of Historic Places listings in Klamath County, Oregon
