= List of National Historic Landmarks in Oregon =

Map showing NHL locations in Oregon. Red dots represent more than one NHL. Click on a label to go to the article for that landmark.

This is a complete List of National Historic Landmarks in Oregon. The United States National Historic Landmark (NHL) program is operated under the auspices of the National Park Service, and recognizes buildings, structures, districts, objects, and similar resources nationwide according to a list of criteria of national significance. The state of Oregon is home to 17 of these landmarks, two of which extend beyond Oregon's borders into other states, as well as one site from which NHL status was withdrawn upon its destruction.

== Background ==
The National Historic Landmark program is administered by the National Park Service, a branch of the U.S. Department of the Interior. The National Park Service determines which properties meet NHL criteria and makes nomination recommendations after an owner notification process. The Secretary of the Interior reviews nominations and, based on a set of predetermined criteria, makes a decision on NHL designation or a determination of eligibility for designation. Both public and privately owned properties are designated as NHLs. This designation provides indirect, partial protection of the historic integrity of the properties, via tax incentives, grants, monitoring of threats, and other means. Owners may object to the nomination of the property as an NHL; when this is the case the Secretary of the Interior can only designate a site as eligible for designation.

NHLs are also included on the National Register of Historic Places (NRHP), which are historic properties that the National Park Service deems to be worthy of preservation. The primary difference between an NHL and a NRHP listing is that the NHLs are determined to have particular national significance, while other NRHP properties may be deemed significant at the local or state level. The NHLs in Oregon comprise 0.8% of the approximately 1,800 properties and districts listed on the NRHP in Oregon.

== Key ==
	National Historic Landmark
^{†}	National Historic Landmark District
^{#}	National Historic Site, National Historical Park, National Memorial, or National Monument
^{*}	Delisted Landmark

== Current National Historic Landmarks ==
	Landmark name	Image	Date designated	Location	County	Description
1^{†}	Bonneville Dam Historic District	Bonneville Dam Historic District	June 30, 1987 (#86000727)	Bonneville; 45°38′29″N 121°56′41″W	Multnomah and Skamania (Washington)	Built in the 1930s to harness the Columbia River for power generation, this was the first hydroelectric dam with a hydraulic drop sufficient to produce 500,000 kW of hydropower. The NHL district covers the dam and other elements of the federal dam project, including the #1 powerhouse, navigation lock, fish ladder, and hatchery.
2^{†}	Columbia River Highway	Columbia River Highway	May 16, 2000 (#83004168)	Troutdale to Mosier; 45°37′27″N 121°44′51″W	Multnomah, Hood River, and Wasco	Constructed between 1913 and 1922, this was the first scenic highway in the United States. Designed specifically to provide visitors access to the most outstanding of the scenic features of the Columbia River Gorge, the highway is also an outstanding example of modern highway development for its pioneering advances in road engineering, and is the single most important contribution to the fields of civil engineering and landscape architecture by Samuel C. Lancaster.
3	Crater Lake Superintendent's Residence	Crater Lake Superintendent's Residence	May 28, 1987 (#87001347)	Crater Lake National Park; 42°54′03″N 122°08′16″W	Klamath	The 1930s-era Munson Valley development was originally one of the best-designed rustic installations in a U.S. national park. This is the only building in the group to remain in near-original condition, and it employed unusual construction methods in response to the very short Crater Lake building season.
4	Deady and Villard Halls, University of Oregon	Deady and Villard Halls, University of Oregon	May 5, 1977 (#72001082)	Eugene; 44°02′48″N 123°04′35″W	Lane	Completed in 1876 and 1886, respectively, Deady and Villard Halls are the first and second buildings of the University of Oregon. Deady Hall is simplified Italianate in design with mansarded main roof and towers; Villard Hall has Second Empire touches, and is one of the few surviving academic buildings of its era in the Western United States.
5	Fort Astoria Site	Fort Astoria Site	November 5, 1961 (#66000639)	Astoria; 46°11′16″N 123°49′39″W	Clatsop	John Jacob Astor attempted to break the British monopoly on the Pacific Northwest fur trade starting with construction of this fortified trading post in 1811. The fort subsequently became an important part of the American territorial claim to the Oregon Country. Astor sold the fort to the British North West Company in 1813.
6	Fort Rock Cave	Fort Rock Cave	January 20, 1961 (#66000641)	Fort Rock; 43°21′22″N 121°03′13″W	Lake	This cave yielded to archeologists the "Fort Rock sandals", the oldest manufactured articles found in the Americas, which demonstrated the early development of weaving among Native Americans. Occupation of the site has been dated to 11,000 BCE.
7^{†}	Jacksonville Historic District	Jacksonville Historic District	November 13, 1966 (#66000950)	Jacksonville; 42°18′45″N 122°58′04″W	Jackson	Founded in 1852 as a mining town, Jacksonville became the principal financial and commercial center of southern Oregon until it was bypassed by the railroad. Its group of surviving, unaltered commercial and residential buildings spans the full range of architectural styles employed in the West between 1850 and 1890. The town's unusual state of preservation and completeness make it a uniquely intact example of a mid-19th century inland commercial town.
8	Kam Wah Chung Company Building	Kam Wah Chung Company Building	September 20, 2005 (#73001575)	John Day; 44°25′07″N 118°57′25″W	Grant	This building is the best known example of a Chinese mercantile and herb store in the United States. It embodies the role of immigrant Chinese in the post-Civil War expansion period of the western United States.
9	Lightship WAL-604, "Columbia"	Lightship WAL-604, "Columbia"	December 20, 1989 (#89002463)	Astoria; 46°11′25″N 123°49′27″W	Clatsop	Retired in 1979 as the last lightship to be stationed at the Columbia River Bar — or anywhere on the Pacific coast of the United States — WAL-604 retains the best historic integrity of the last generation of U.S. Coast Guard lightships after 1939. WAL-604, built in 1950, and its relatives closely resembled earlier lightship types in external appearance, but were a distinct departure in their overall design.
10^{†}	Lower Klamath National Wildlife Refuge	Lower Klamath National Wildlife Refuge	January 12, 1965 (#66000238)	Dorris, California; 41°56′48″N 121°39′57″W	Klamath and Siskiyou (California)	This national wildlife refuge, established in 1908, was the first large block of public land set aside for wildlife management purposes. Because of the refuge's extensive overlap with the Klamath Basin water reclamation project, it has become an ongoing example of the tensions between conservation and economic demands in public land management.
11	Oregon Caves Chateau	Oregon Caves Chateau	May 28, 1987 (#87001346)	Oregon Caves National Monument; 42°05′54″N 123°24′27″W	Josephine	This rustically intimate site features a shaggy bark finish, stone retaining walls, fishponds, waterfalls, and walkways. Built in 1934, the structure makes use of a very limited site over a canyon, and retains a high degree of integrity in its design, furnishings, and setting.
12	Pioneer Courthouse	Pioneer Courthouse	May 5, 1977 (#73001582)	Portland; 45°31′08″N 122°40′40″W	Multnomah	Built in 1875 and restored in the 1970s, this was one of the first monumental buildings in the Pacific Northwest. It has served as a U.S. courthouse, a customhouse, and a post office. It underwent another rehabilitation in the 2000s.
13^{†}	Skidmore/Old Town Historic District	Skidmore/Old Town Historic District	May 5, 1977 (#75001597)	Portland; 45°31′21″N 122°40′18″W	Multnomah	One of the most impressive historic commercial districts on the West Coast, this is where Portland began and first flourished. The buildings, which date from the mid-to-late-19th century, were built in a variety of High Victorian architectural styles, and many feature cast iron fronts.
14	Sunken Village Archeological Site	Sunken Village Archeological Site	December 20, 1989 (#89002455)	Sauvie Island; 45°41′49″N 122°50′20″W	Multnomah	The archeological remains of this Chinookan village, dating from the mid-13th to the mid-18th centuries CE, are unusually well preserved. This cosmopolitan people's complex hunter-gatherer economy and extensive trade network allowed them to establish one of the highest population densities in aboriginal North America, yet they left very few physical remains. The site has been subject to erosion and looting, problems which have been ameliorated by a protective layer of riprap.
15	Timberline Lodge	Timberline Lodge	December 22, 1977 (#73001572)	Government Camp; 45°19′52″N 121°42′41″W	Clackamas	President Franklin D. Roosevelt dedicated this lodge at an elevation of 6,000 feet (1,830 m) on the south slope of Mount Hood in 1937. It is considered the finest example of 1930s-era "mountain architecture" by the Works Progress Administration.
16^{#}	Wallowa Lake Site	Wallowa Lake Site	May 5, 1989 (#89001082)	Joseph; 45°20′11″N 117°13′20″W	Wallowa	The religious and cultural values associated with this traditional Nez Perce campground have persisted for over a century since Chief Joseph the Younger and his band of nontreaty Nez Perce were driven out. It provides a view of high, glaciated lake and mountain country, and includes the final resting place of Chief Joseph the Elder. It is a unit within the Nez Perce National Historical Park.
17	Aubrey Watzek House	Aubrey Watzek House	July 25, 2011 (#74001715)	Portland; 45°30′56″N 122°43′39″W	Multnomah	John Yeon's 1937 house for a lumber magnate combined the International Style with regional preferences to create the Northwest Style

== Former National Historic Landmark ==
	Site name	Image	Date designated	Date withdrawn	Locality	County	Description
1	Samuel Elmore Cannery	Photograph of the Samuel Elmore Cannery while it was in operation, with a "Bumble Bee" sign hanging above the door.	November 13, 1966	July 16, 1993	Astoria; 46°11′30″N 123°50′45″W	Clatsop	The home of "Bumble Bee" brand tuna, this was the longest continuously operated salmon cannery in the United States, from its construction in 1898 until decommissioning in 1980. The canned salmon industry was a cornerstone of the Northwest's resource-based economy from the late 1860s until after World War II. Amid seasonal and declining salmon stocks, the cannery diversified into tuna in the 1930s. Because of structural deterioration, the building was slated for demolition in 1991, and it burned in 1993.

== See also ==
- Historic preservation
- List of U.S. National Historic Landmarks by state
- Lists of Oregon-related topics
- National Register of Historic Places listings in Oregon
- List of National Natural Landmarks in Oregon
