= Richardson–Ulrich House =

Historic house in Oregon, United States

- U.S. National Register of Historic Places
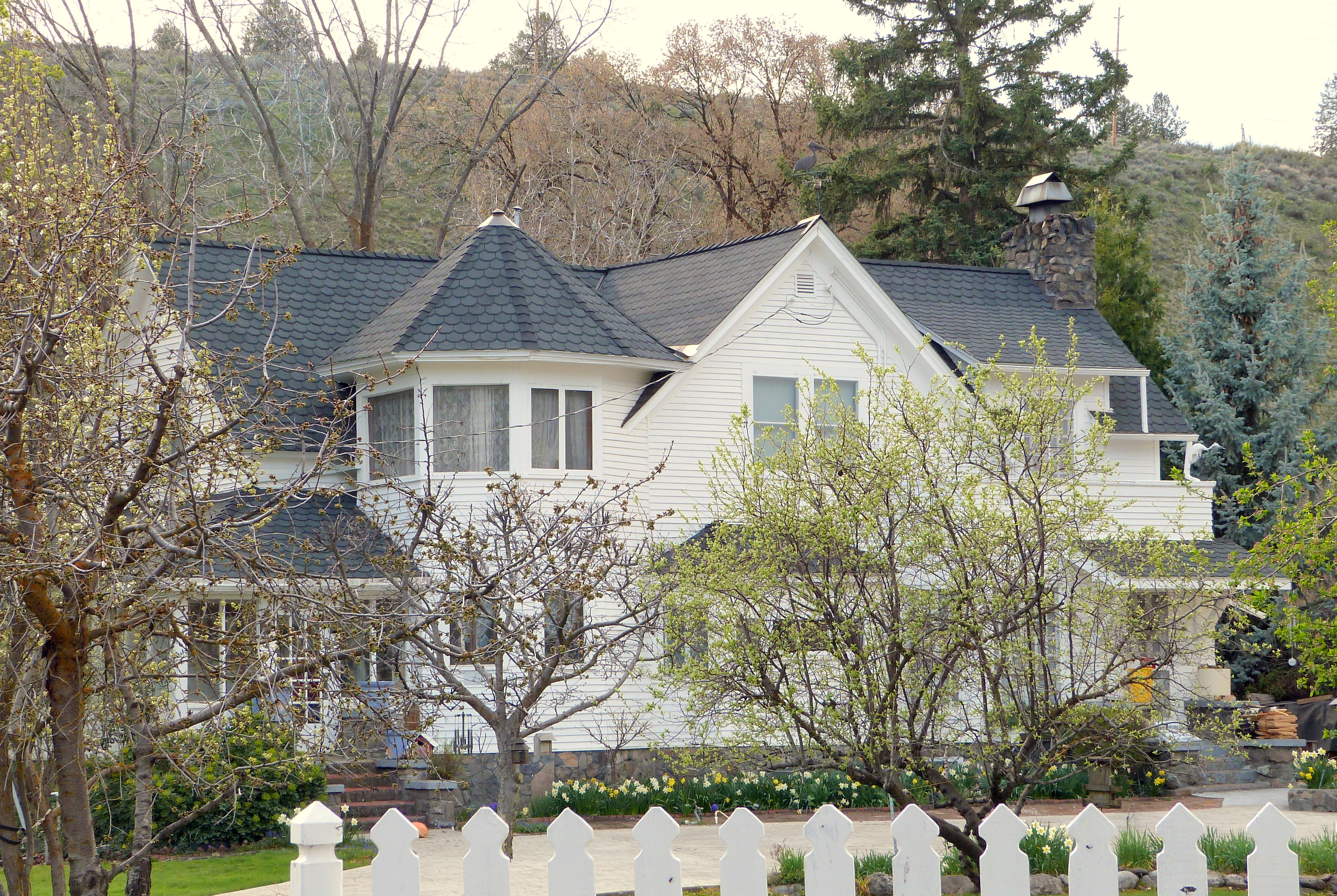
- The Richardson–Ulrich House in 2015
- Location: 636 Conger Avenue; Klamath Falls, Oregon
- Coordinates: 42°13′24″N 121°47′40″W
- Area: Approx. 0.65 acres (0.26 ha)
- Built: 1885, remodeled and expanded 1908–1910
- Architectural style: Queen Anne, Shingle, Craftsman
- NRHP reference No.: 88001244
- Added to NRHP: August 11, 1988

The Richardson–Ulrich House is a historic residence in Klamath Falls, Oregon, United States.

The house was listed on the National Register of Historic Places in 1988.

== History ==
The Richardson–Ulrich House was built in 1885 as a farmhouse in Linkville, Oregon modern day Klamath Falls, Oregon. The house was later remodeled in 1908 by Robert and Anna Richardson. In 1920 the house was sold to George and Minnie Ulrich.

The house was originally constructed within the 120-acre apple orchard of Joseph Conger. Following Conger's death in 1908 the property was eventually subdivided.

The Richardson's moved to Klamath Falls in 1906. Robert Richardson served as a court reporter for eight years and served under Judge Henry Benson and Judge George Nolan. He worked additionally as a court reporter for the First Judicial District and as a U.S. Commissioner in Klamath Falls. Anna Richardson was actively entertaining guests at the house and was active within the community.

George and Minnie Ulrich added multiple additions to the house and remained at the residence until their deaths in 1951 and 1953. George Ulrich and his family moved into Klamath Falls in 1914 and purchased the Richardson house. George worked as a district manager of the Mutual Life Insurance Company. Minnie Ulrich was an accomplished musician, who would also regularly bring members of the community to their home.

== See also ==
- National Register of Historic Places listings in Klamath County, Oregon
