= Ross Ragland Theater =

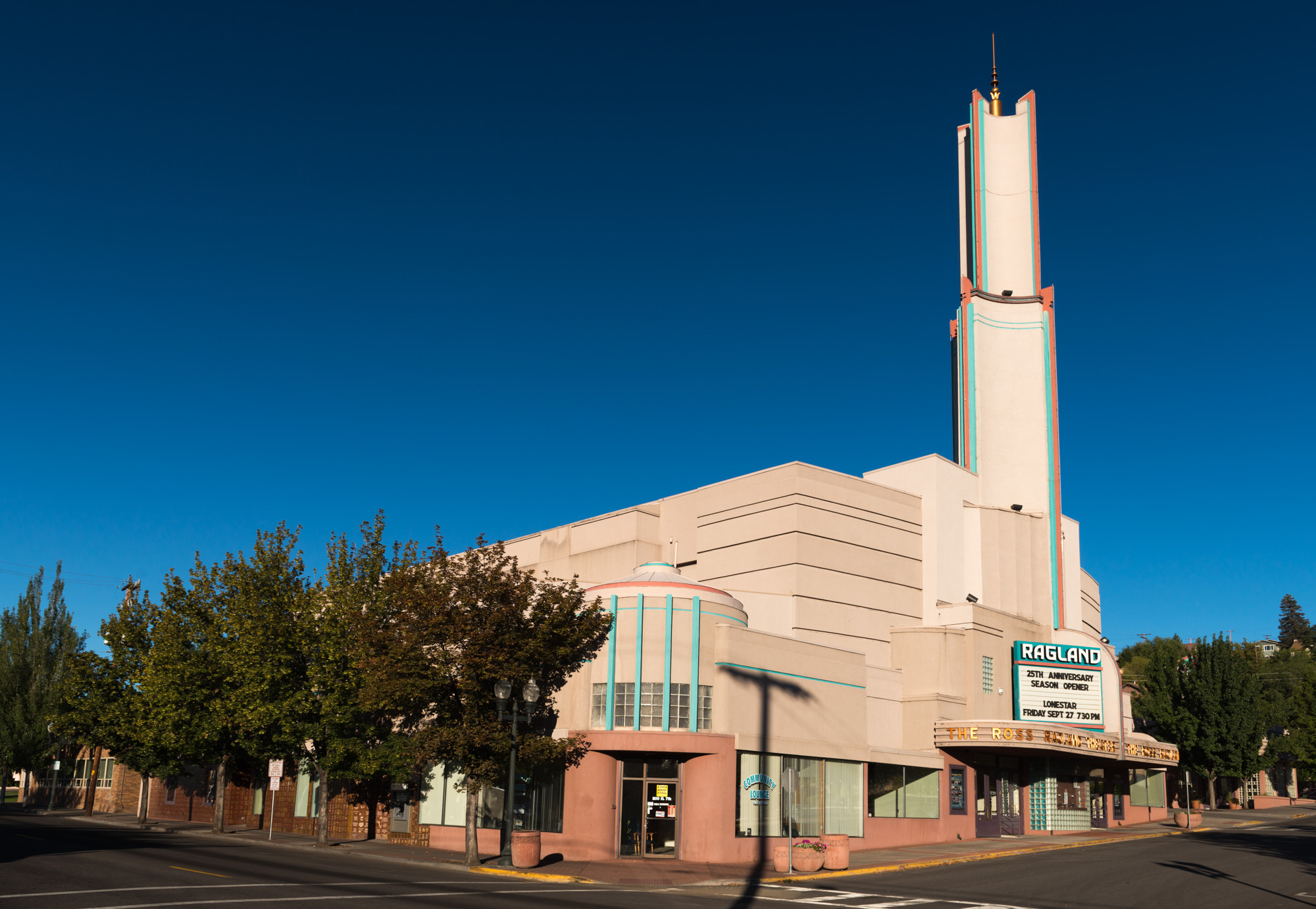
- Exterior of the Ross Ragland Theater in Klamath Falls, Oregon.
- Interactive map of Ross Ragland Theater
- Address: 218 N 7th St; Klamath Falls
- Coordinates: 42°13′33.78″N 121°46′58.37″W
- Capacity: 700
- Type: Performing arts center

Construction
- Opened: 1940 (as Esquire Theater); 1989 (as Ross Ragland)

Website
- ragland.org

Ross Ragland Theater is a premier performing arts center and cultural hub located in Klamath Falls, Oregon. The Ross Ragland Theater has a history of over 80 years. The building fashions an art deco design.

== History ==
=== Early History: The Esquire Theater (1940–1982) ===
Originally opening in 1940, the Esquire Theater showed its first film, "The Westerner" starring Gary Cooper who also starred in "For Whom the Bell Tolls".

Due to declining patronage, the Esquire Theater could not afford to remain open, closing its doors in 1982 and remaining vacant for several years.

=== Transition and Saving the Theater (1980s) ===
By the mid 1980s the Esquire Theater was scheduled for demolition. A campaign led by local citizens of Klamath Falls managed to save the building and ownership was transferred to the City of Klamath Falls. The city eventually gave the building to a new nonprofit.

The theater was named in honor of Ross Ragland, who was a prominent civic leader. Ragland was a member and chairman of the renovation campaign who had passed away before the project's completion in 1987.

=== Re-opening and Expansion (1989–Present) ===
The Ross Ragland Theater was reopened in 1989, after $2 million dollars spent in renovations, showing a local production of "The Music Man." In 1997, another $2 million dollars was spent to build the Cultural Center, adding banquet rooms and a kitchen to serve weddings and community events.
