= Judge Henry L. Benson House =

- U.S. National Register of Historic Places
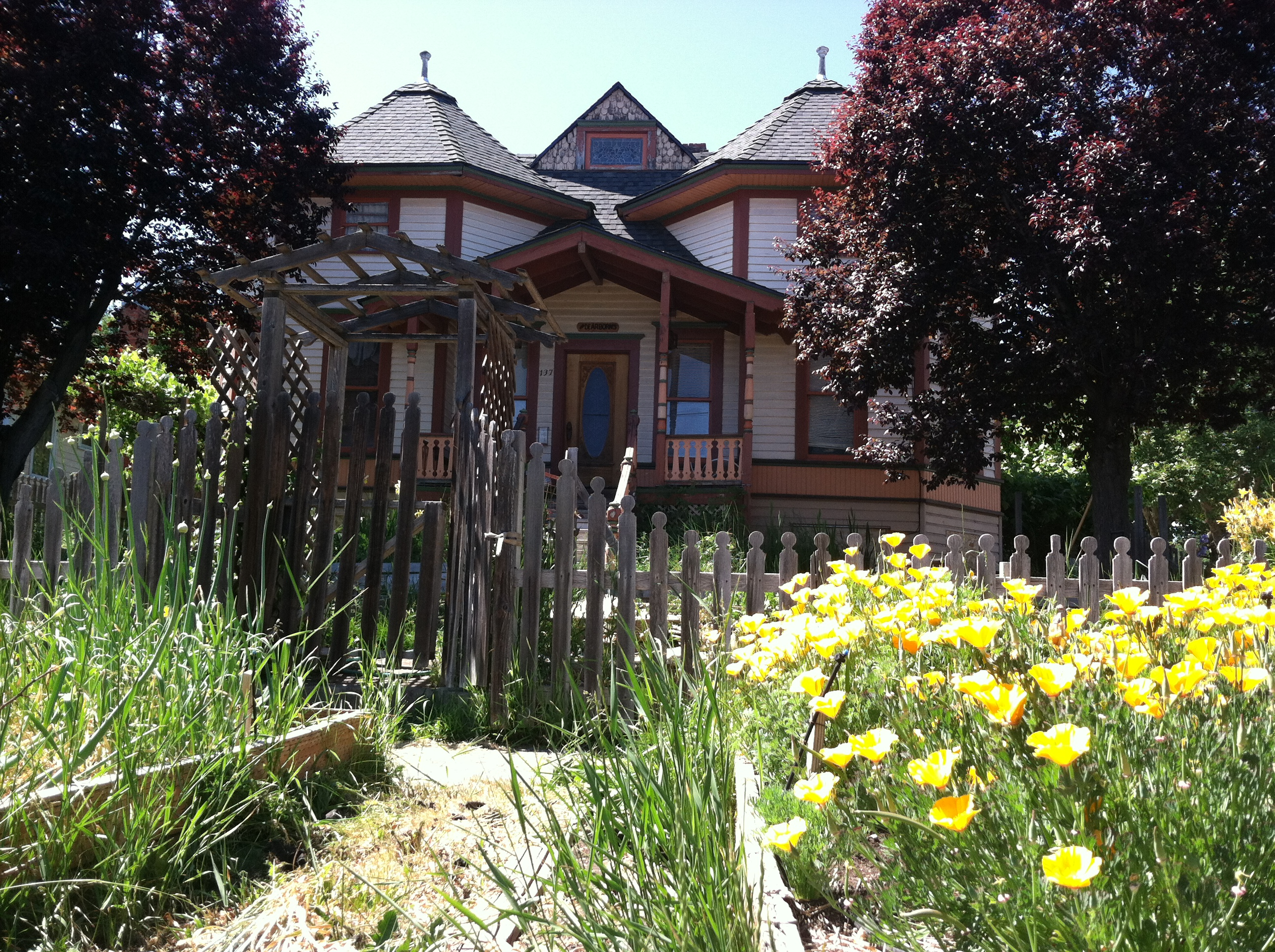

- Location within Oregon Location within the United States
- Location: 137 High St., Klamath Falls, Oregon
- Coordinates: 42°13′22.94″N 121°47′15.557″W
- Built: 1892
- Architectural style: Octagon Mode, Queen Anne
- NRHP reference No.: 81000496
- Added to NRHP: December 2, 1981

The Judge Henry L. Benson House, built in 1892, is an historic octagon house located at 137 High Street in Klamath Falls, Oregon. In 1981 it was added to the National Register of Historic Places.

It is a two-story frame house, built to a T-shaped plan with two symmetrical octagonal towers. The towers have conical roofs topped by "witches caps" and wood spires with finials. It was home of Judge Henry Lamdin Benson during 1898 to 1921. Benson was Speaker of the Oregon House of Representatives. He served as a State Supreme Court Justice from 1915 until his death in 1921.
