= Whaleback Snow-Survey Cabin =

- U.S. National Register of Historic Places
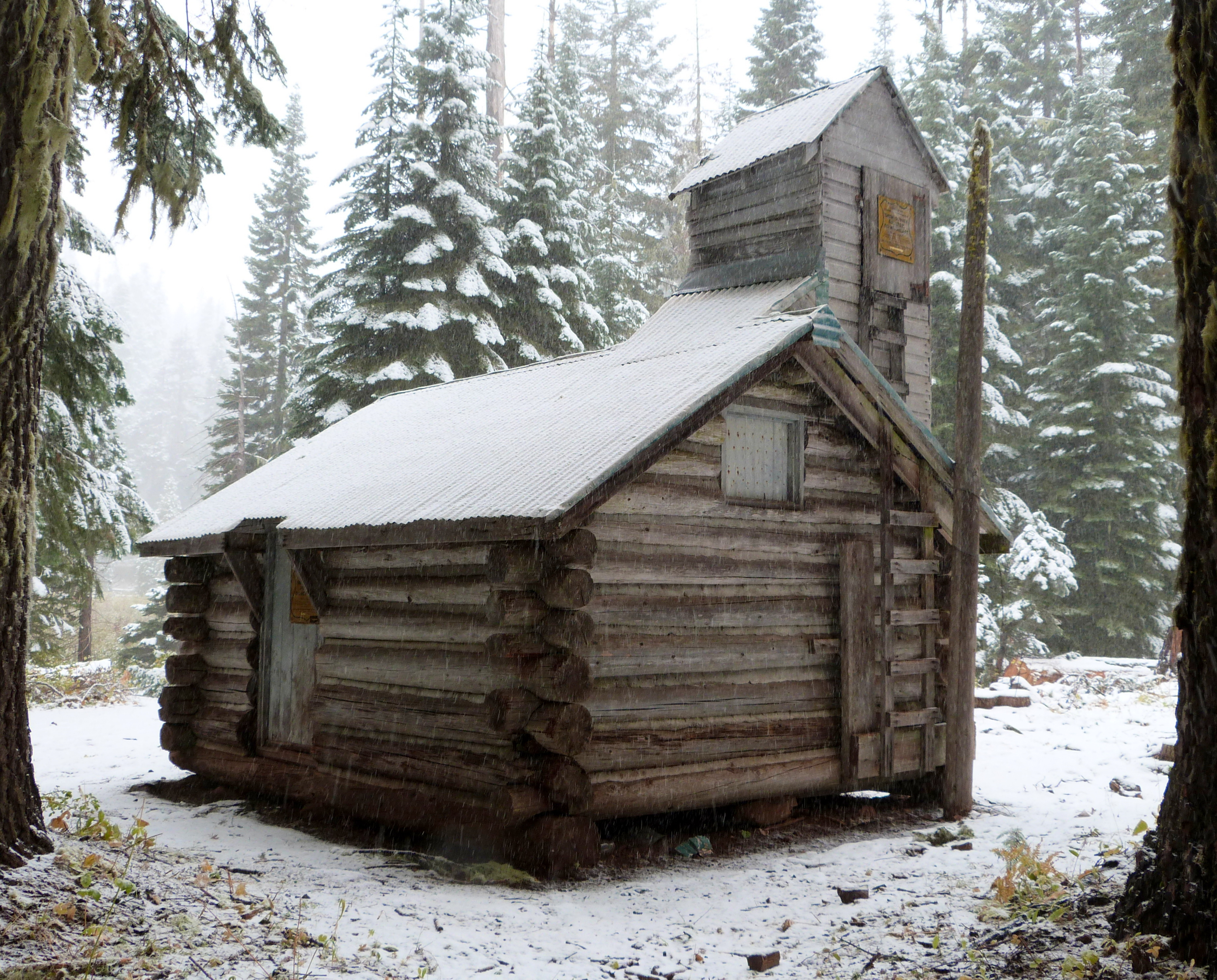
- The cabin in the first snow of 2017
- Location: Approximately 10 miles (16 km) north of Prospect in the Rogue River–Siskiyou National Forest
- Coordinates: 42.911229°N 122.580729°W
- Area: 0.8 acres (0.32 ha)
- Built: 1937
- Architect: Work, R.A.
- Architectural style: Late 19th And Early 20th Century American Movements, Log cabin
- MPS: US Forest Service Historic Structures on the Rogue River National Forest MPS
- NRHP reference No.: 00000514
- Added to NRHP: December 29, 2000

The Whaleback Snow-Survey Cabin, about 10 miles (16 km) north of Prospect in the Rogue River–Siskiyou National Forest in southwest Oregon, is a log cabin with a "snow tower" built in 1937. It is situated on the east slope of Whaleback Mountain. It was listed on the National Register of Historic Places in 2000.

It is a one-room log cabin about 12 by 14 feet (3.7 m × 4.3 m) in plan, on sill logs apparently on rock footings, built by R.A. Work and others. Its logs are probably Shasta Red Fir. It has a "Santa Claus" snow tower, about 12 feet (3.7 m) tall and about 4 by 4 feet (1.2 m × 1.2 m) in size, to allow access during deep snow. According to the NRHP nomination,

The idea for the distinctive tower or "Santa Claus" chimney on the Whaleback cabin had evolved the year before during a winter expedition into South Lake. In January 1936, R.A. Work and a companion skied into South Lake to complete a snow survey. They reached the South Lake cabin site a little before dark but were unable to locate it. Work described their dilemma: "We couldn't find the log cabin. We knew where the cabin was supposed to be and we feared that maybe some hunters had burned it down... We got our snow-tubes out, went to the place where we believed the cabin to be and started "sounding." Sure enough, we hit wood. We kept sounding until we came over the ridgepole of the cabin roof... Then we started digging, with our skis and with our hand-axe... We dug a hole down eleven feet to get into that cabin.. .The next year we put a "chimney" entrance on the cabin, and then could climb down through the wooden "chimney" into the cabin, underneath the snowdrifts."
