= Arcade Hotel (Klamath Falls, Oregon) =

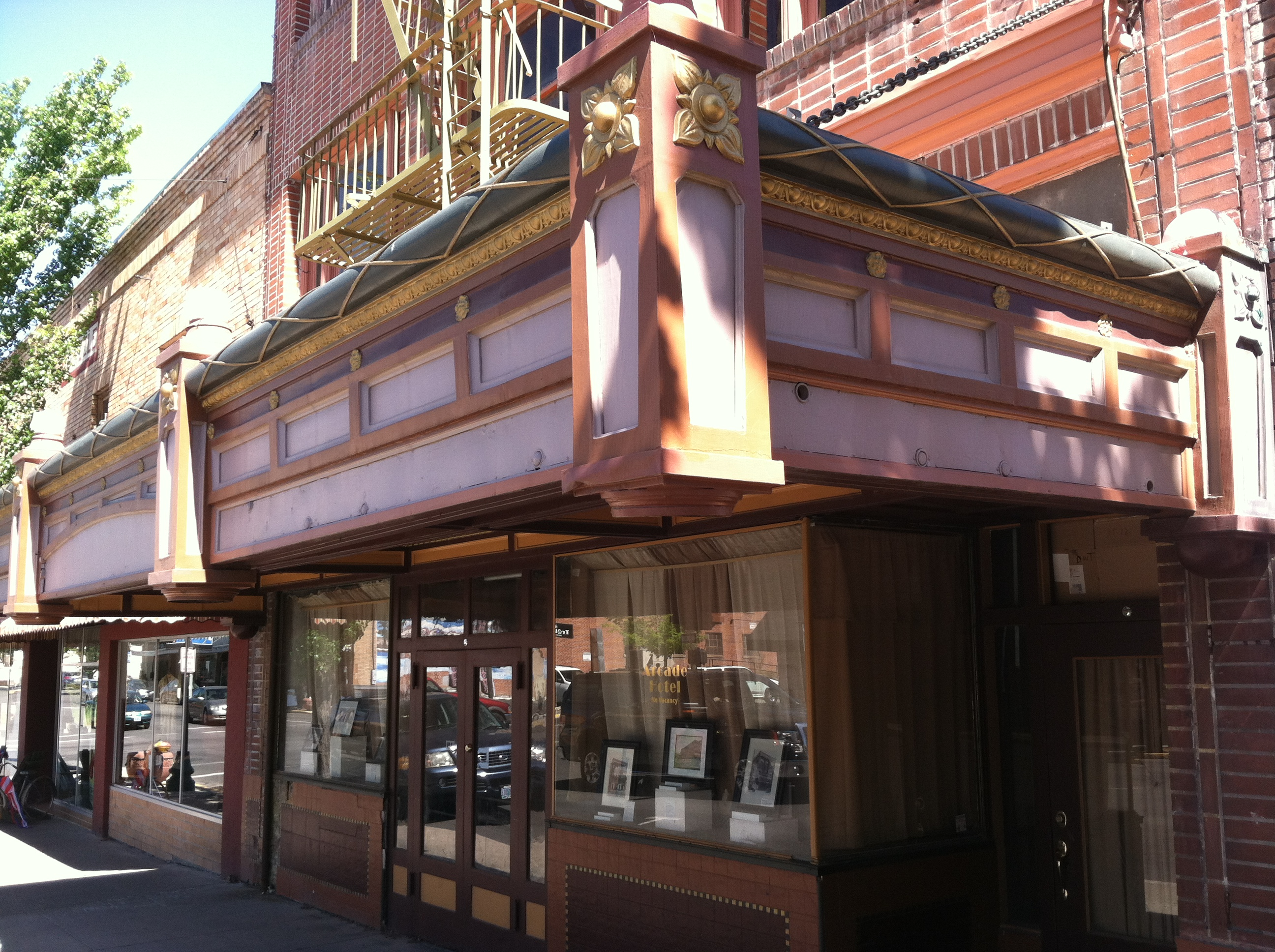
- The Arcade Hotel building in 2011.
- Interactive map of the Arcade Hotel area

General information
- Status: Under renovation
- Type: Hotel
- Architectural style: Chicago School
- Location: 1032 Main Street; Klamath Falls, Oregon, U.S.
- Coordinates: 42.22719°N 121.779073°W
- Construction started: 1919
- Completed: May 1920
- Owner: Forefathers Capital

Technical details
- Floor count: 4

Design and construction
- Architect: A.F. Heide

The Arcade Hotel is a historic four-story building located in Klamath Falls, Oregon, United States. Opened in May of 1920, it is a prominent example of the Chicago Style. For 50 years the building served as a lodging hub, however; the Arcade fell into disrepair. As of 2025, the building is subject to preservation and redevelopment is aimed at reopening the Arcade as a boutique hotel.

== History ==
Architect A. F. Heidel designed the 52-room Arcade, which was commissioned by two brothers, George and Christos Blanas for $40,000. Construction began immediately, and the building officially opened in May 1920.

The Blanas brothers added another four story brick buildings into the rear of the Arcade in 1923 for another $20,000.

In 2012, the building owner, Daniel Ley told the Klamath Falls City Council that he had difficulties repairing the building, calling it a "slow renovation". The city would consider buying the property, although had deemed that the property was not worth the price.

=== Preservation (2025-Present) ===
In 2025 the Klamath Falls Downtown Association (KFDA) announced that the association received at $200,000 grant, the Oregon Main Street Revitalization Grant (OMSRG). This grant was given to the KFDA to support rehabilitation and reopening of the Arcade Hotel.
