= Blackburn Sanitarium =

- U.S. National Register of Historic Places
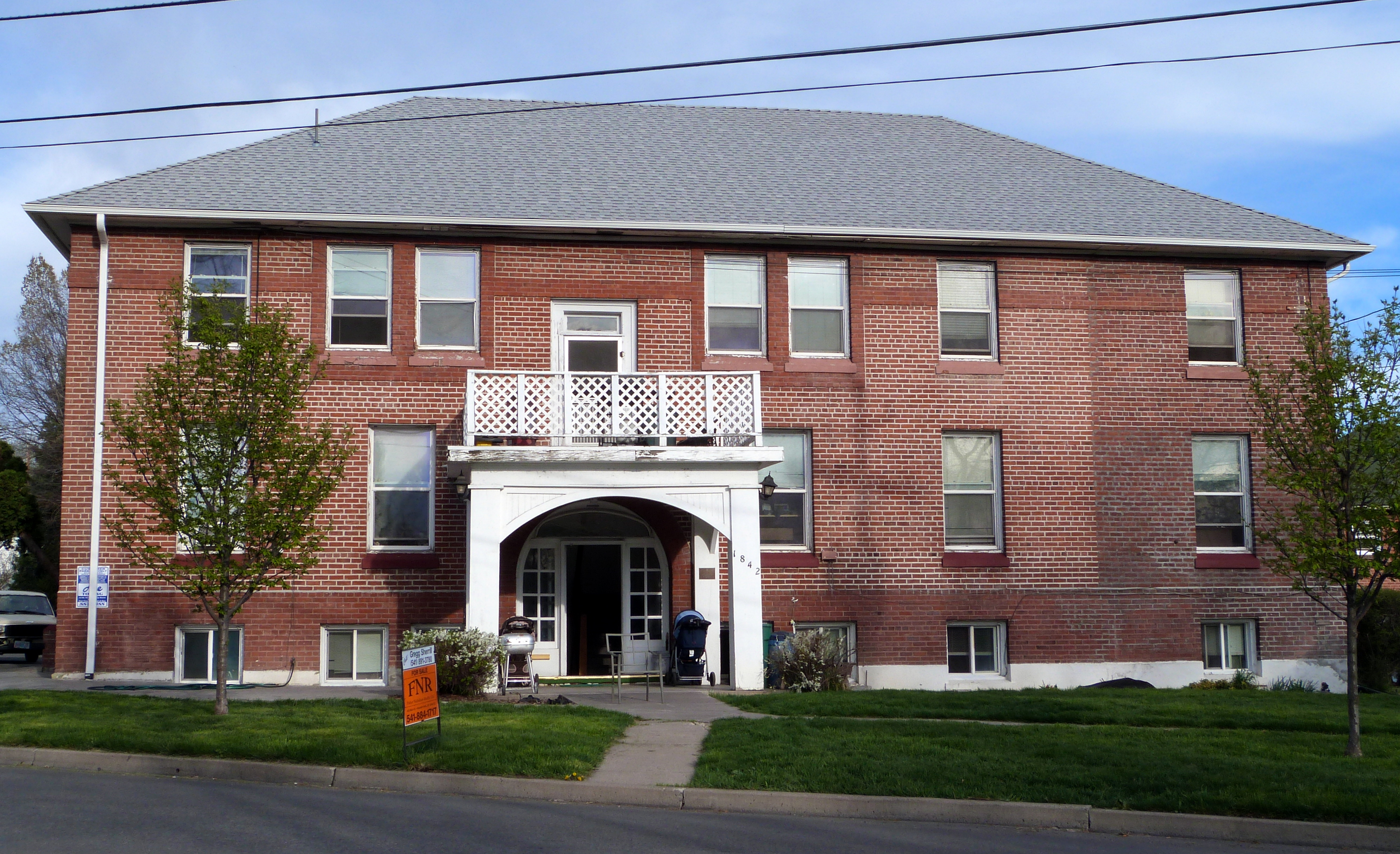
- The Blackburn Sanitarium in 2015
- Location: 1842 Esplanade Avenue; Klamath Falls, Oregon
- Coordinates: 42°13′58″N 121°46′25″W
- Area: 0.2 acres (0.081 ha)
- Built: 1912
- Architectural style: Romanesque
- NRHP reference No.: 96001046
- Added to NRHP: September 27, 1996

The Blackburn Sanitarium is a building in Klamath Falls, Oregon, in the United States. It was built in 1912 and added to the National Register of Historic Places on September 27, 1996.

== See also ==
- National Register of Historic Places listings in Klamath County, Oregon
