= Klamath Falls City Hall =

- U.S. National Register of Historic Places
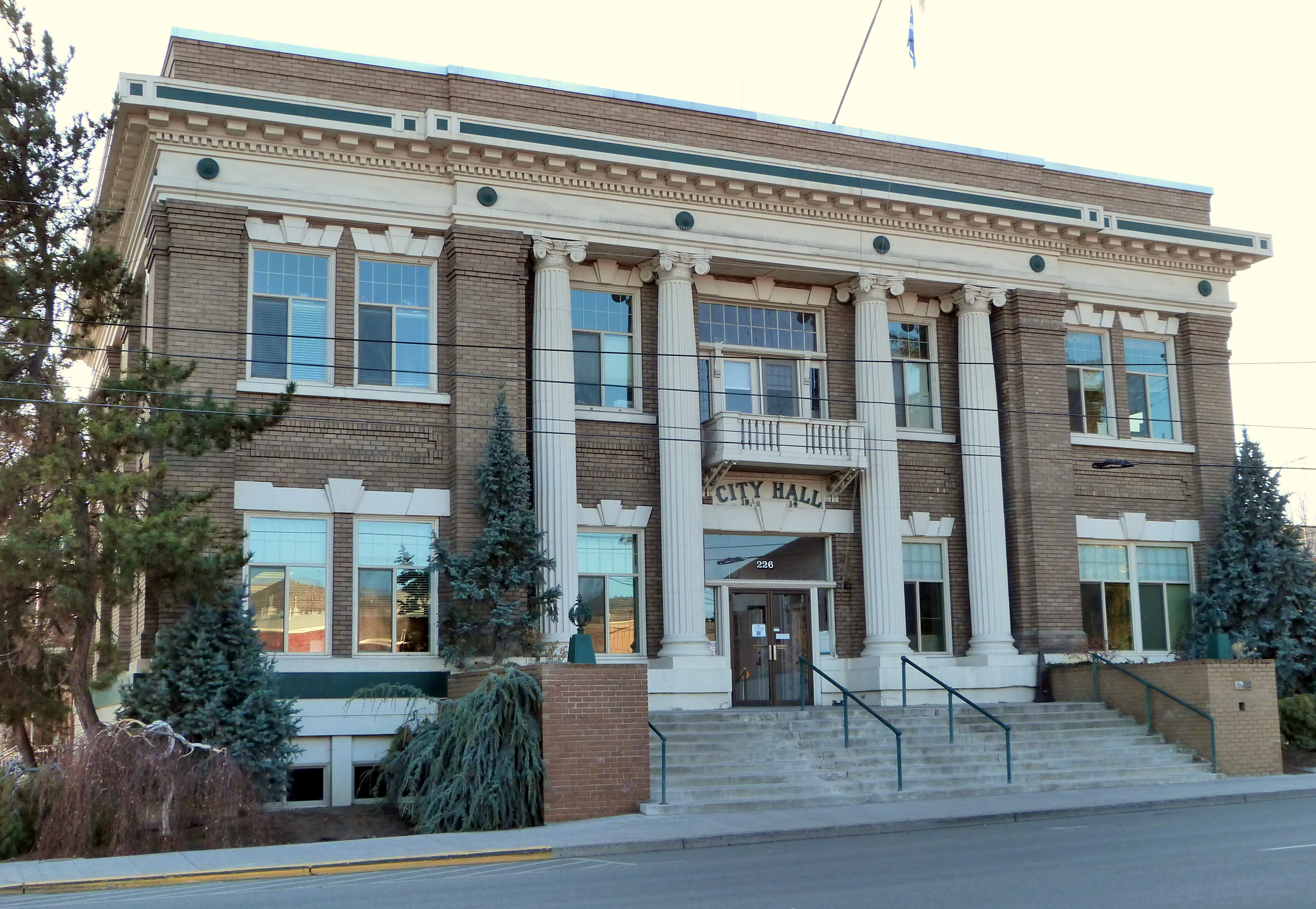
- The Klamath Falls City Hall in 2014

- Location within Oregon Location within the United States
- Location: 226 South 5th Street; Klamath Falls, Oregon
- Coordinates: 42°13′24″N 121°46′51″W
- Area: 0.2 acres (0.081 ha)
- Built: 1914
- Architect: Earl Beach Veghte
- Architectural style: Beaux Arts
- NRHP reference No.: 89001861
- Added to NRHP: October 30, 1989

Klamath Falls City Hall is a city hall building in Klamath Falls, Oregon, in the United States. It was built in 1914 and added to the National Register of Historic Places on October 30, 1989.

It is a two-and-a-half-story Beaux Arts-style building designed by Earl Veghte, a young architect.

It has four colossal Ionic columns. It has brick and contrasting concrete trim elements, including flat-arched lintels with raised keystones and voussoirs.

== See also ==
- National Register of Historic Places listings in Klamath County, Oregon
