= Bisbee Hotel =

- U.S. National Register of Historic Places
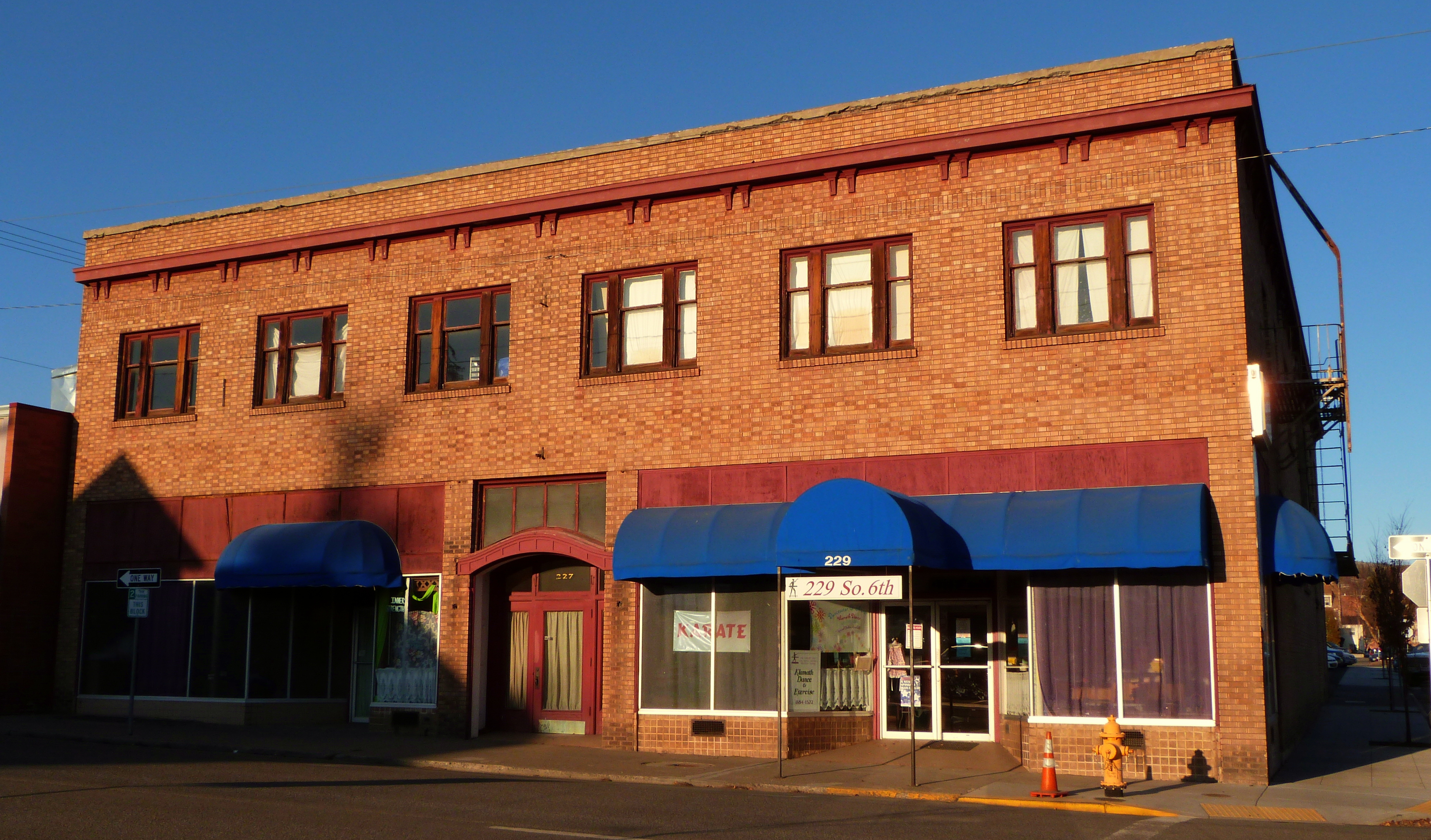
- The Bisbee Hotel in 2014

- Location within Oregon Location within the United States
- Location: 229 South 6th Street; Klamath Falls, Oregon
- Coordinates: 42°13′27″N 121°46′47″W
- Area: less than one acre
- Built: 1926
- Architectural style: Early Commercial
- NRHP reference No.: 06000938
- Added to NRHP: October 12, 2006

The Bisbee Hotel is a hotel building in Klamath Falls, Oregon, in the United States. It was built in 1926 and added to the National Register of Historic Places on October 12, 2006. It is at 229 South Sixth Street. It was home toe a Montgomery Ward store.

== See also ==
- National Register of Historic Places listings in Klamath County, Oregon
