= Mutual Life Insurance Company =

Mutual Life Insurance Company may refer to:

- Asahi Mutual Life Insurance Co, based in Tokyo, Japan
- The Dai-ichi Mutual Life Insurance Company, based in Tokyo, Japan
- Golden State Mutual Life Insurance Company, based in Los Angeles, California
- Massachusetts Mutual Life Insurance Company
- Mutual Life Insurance Company of New York, later Mutual of New York (MONY), and now part of AXA
- New England Mutual Life Insurance Company, acquired by MetLife in 1995
- North Carolina Mutual Life Insurance Company
- Northwestern Mutual Life Insurance Company, based in Milwaukee, Wisconsin
- United Mutual Life Insurance Company, acquired by MetLife in 1992
- Mutual Life & Citizens Assurance Company Limited, later known MLC Life Insurance and officially as MLC Limited, a former Australian company

== See also ==
- Mutual insurance, where policyholders have certain "ownership" rights in the organization
