= Crater Lake Superintendent's Residence =

Historic house in Oregon, United States

- U.S. National Register of Historic Places
- U.S. National Historic Landmark
- U.S. Historic district – Contributing property
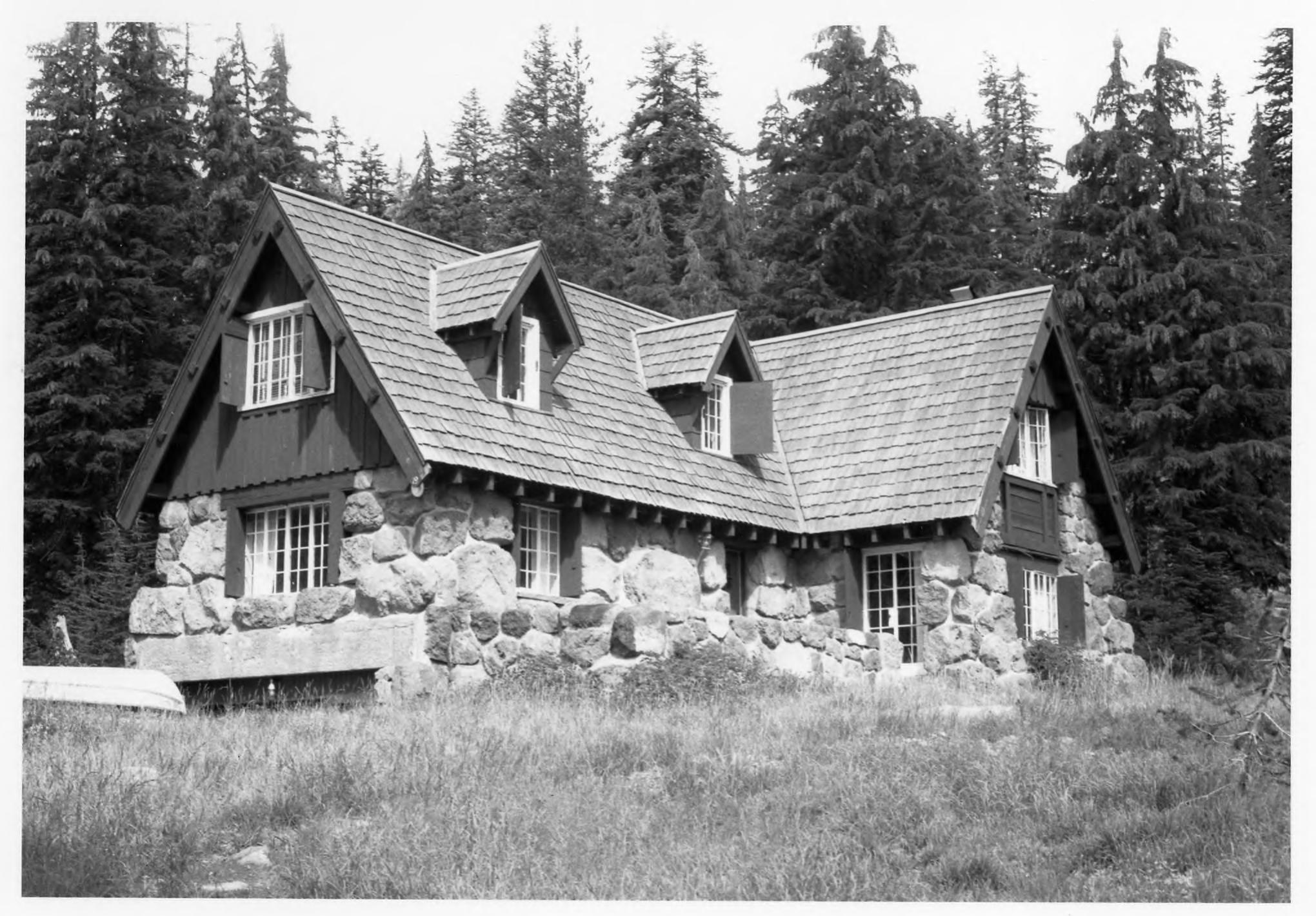
- Location: Crater Lake National Park, Oregon
- Nearest city: Fort Klamath, Oregon
- Coordinates: 42°54′00.75″N 122°08′14.60″W
- Built: 1932
- Architect: NPS Branch of Plans & Design, et al..
- Architectural style: National Park Service rustic
- Part of: Munson Valley Historic District (ID88002622)
- NRHP reference No.: 87001347

Significant dates
- Added to NRHP: May 28, 1987
- Designated NHL: May 28, 1987
- Designated CP: December 1, 1988

Crater Lake Superintendent's Residence, is "an impressive structure of massive boulders and heavy-handed woodwork" at Crater Lake National Park in southern Oregon. It was declared a National Historic Landmark in 1987 as an important example of 1930s National Park Service Rustic architecture.

== Location, layout and amenities ==
The park Superintendent's Residence is located at north end of Munson Valley Historic District. It was constructed in 1933. The building's footprint is 33 by 61 feet (10 by 19 m) with a rustic stone superstructure and wood-shake roof. The first floor includes an entry hall, living room with lava-rock fireplace, a dining room, kitchen, and bedroom with adjoining bathroom. The second floor has four additional bedrooms and two bathrooms. The building was framed in Douglas fir and the roof covered with cedar shakes.

Today, the building houses part of the park's Science and Learning Center. It opened its doors on August 26, 2006. The Superintendent's House was completely restored and retrofitted for safety in order to become useful once more to serve scientists and students in studies pertaining to Crater Lake and the surrounding area. The main house is used as library, meeting space, and offices and is furnished with the original Imperial Monterey furniture. An adjacent secondary building serves as a bunkhouse for visitors, and houses a mixture of reproduction and original Imperial Monterey furniture. The reproduction furniture was created as part of a graduate student project by two students from the Oregon College of Art and Craft.

== Furnishings ==
The Imperial furniture line conserved for Crater Lake National Park by MPF Conservation. The line was originally purchased by the NPS through Meier & Frank in Portland, Oregon. It is one of two largest complete lines known in existence in a public place, the other being a line of Mason Monterey furniture just a few hours away at the Oregon Caves National Monument. The Imperial furniture line is one of the best known of the Furniture lines popularized at the time of Monterey. It was made in Los Angeles, California in the early 1930s. The Imperial line utilized mahogany as their primary wood, usually stained dark brown with a silvery sheen, created by grain filler, probably silex or calcium chloride. The line was solid and heavy, accented by top quality ironwork. Originally the line was upholstered in a multicolored cotton weave in a fiesta-influenced pattern. The restoration show covers chosen were rich red and cordovan colored waxed top grain aniline leathers, which was also appropriate to the time.

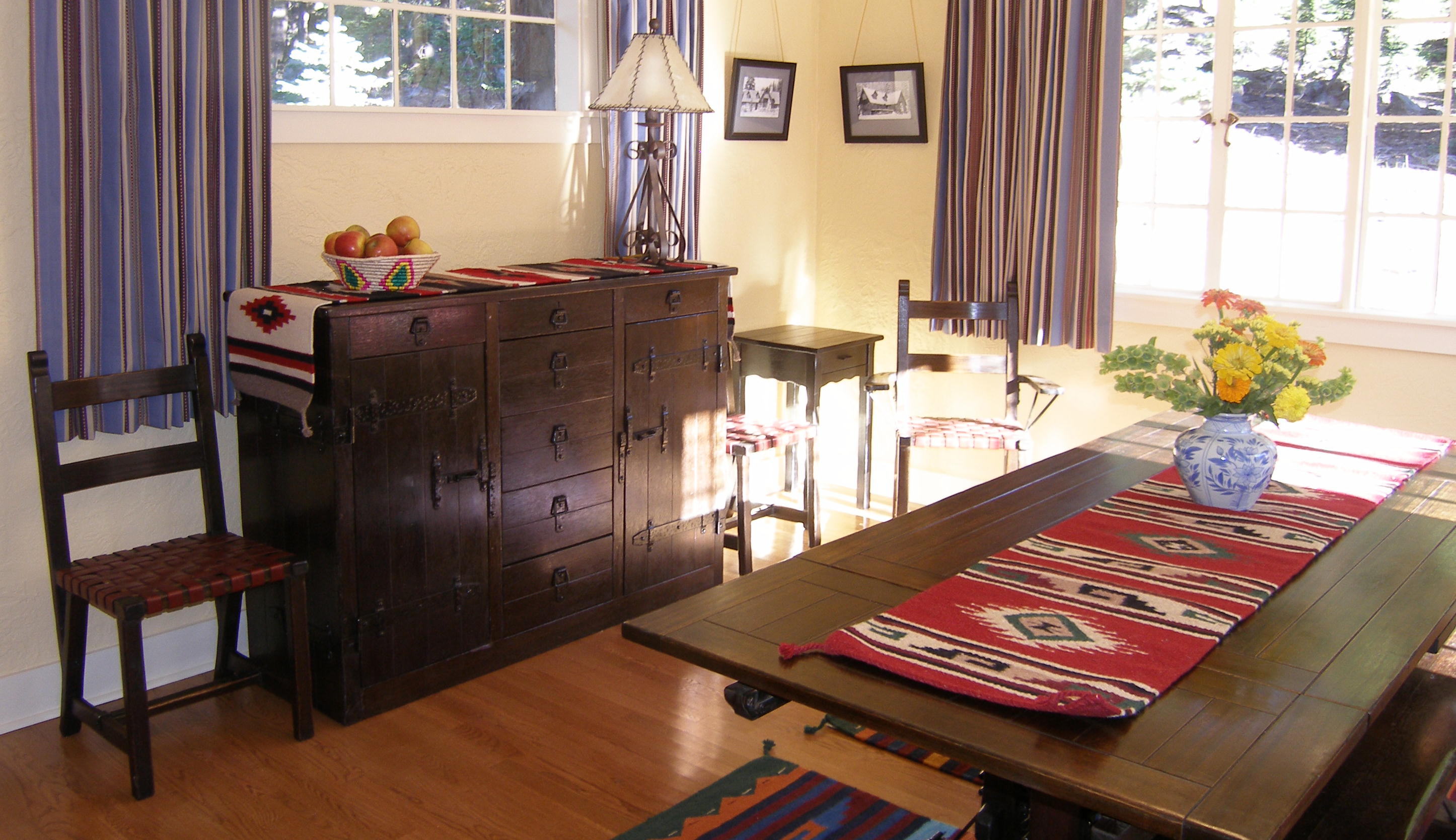
Original Imperial Monterey furniture shown in the dining room it may have resided in at the Superintendent's House at Crater Lake National Park, now the Science and Learning Center. The hutch is a prohibition hutch, and has a hidden latch whereby a pop-up bar raises in the back.

== See also ==
- National Park Service Rustic
