= 96.5 FM =

FM radio frequency

The following radio stations broadcast on FM frequency 96.5 MHz: .

== Argentina ==
- Acqua in Pinamar, Buenos Aires
- Aire de San Javier in San Javier, Santa Fe
- Arequito in Arequito, Santa Fe
- Canning in Canning, Buenos Aires
- Classic in Avellaneda, Santa Fe
- CNN Radio Bahía Blanca in Bahía Blanca, Buenos Aires
- Del Sol in El Calafate, Santa Cruz
- El Portal in Rio Turbio, Santa Cruz
- Exitos in San Rafael, Mendoza
- Express in Villa María, Córdoba
- Infinito in Salta, Salta
- La Plata in La Plata, Buenos Aires
- Laguna in San Carlos Centro, Santa Fe
- LRI741 in San Guillermo, Santa Fe
- LRM408 in Arequito, Santa Fe
- LRM750 in Rafaela, Santa Fe
- LRP408 Music And Company in Balcarce, Buenos Aires
- LRS769 in Máximo Paz, Santa Fe
- Mitre Rosario in Rosario, Santa Fe
- News in Arrecifes, Buenos Aires
- Norte in Jáchal, San Juan
- Nueva Visión in San Gregorio, Santa Fe
- Paz in Paso del Rey, Buenos Aires
- Rafaela in Rafaela, Santa Fe
- Residencias in Mar del Plata, Buenos Aires
- San Jorge in Caleta Olivia, Santa Cruz
- Suquía in Córdoba
- Universidad Nacional de Cuyo in Mendoza
- WK in Chilecito, La Rioja

== Australia ==
- Triple J in Griffith, New South Wales
- 3EON in Bendigo, Victoria
- 3HHH in Horsham, Victoria
- 3INR in Melbourne, Victoria
- Red FM in Geraldton, Western Australia
- 96.5 Wave FM in Wollongong, New South Wales

== Belize ==
- KREM FM at Belize City; Carmelita Village; Santa Elena, Cayo District; Punta Gorda

== Canada (Channel 243) ==
- CBF-FM-8 in Trois-Rivieres, Quebec
- CBTI-FM in Moricetown, British Columbia
- CBUF-FM-6 in Kamloops, British Columbia
- CBZD-FM in Doaktown, New Brunswick
- CFTX-FM in Gatineau, Quebec
- CHFR-FM in Hornby Island, British Columbia
- CHOA-FM in Rouyn-Noranda, Quebec
- CIPI-FM in Beauval, Saskatchewan
- CIRU-FM in St. Stephen, New Brunswick
- CIXN-FM in Fredericton, New Brunswick
- CJBC-3-FM in Penetanguishene, Ontario
- CJLY-FM-1 in Crawford Bay, British Columbia
- CJPG-FM in Portage la Prairie, Manitoba
- CJTL-FM in Pickle Lake, Ontario
- CKLJ-FM in Olds, Alberta
- CKMN-FM in Rimouski, Quebec
- CKRQ-FM in Whapmagootui, Quebec
- CKUL-FM in Halifax, Nova Scotia
- VF2213 in Luscar, Alberta
- VF2300 in James Smith Reserve, Saskatchewan
- VF7180 in Rockland, Ontario

== China ==
- CNR Business Radio in Jinan
- CNR China Traffic Radio in Cangzhou
- CNR Music Radio in Baoshan
- CNR The Voice of China in Qinhuangdao

== Ireland ==
- Midlands 103 in Mullingar

== Malaysia ==
- Nasional FM in Central Kelantan

== Mexico ==
- XHARR-FM in Dr. Arroyo, Nuevo León
- XHBTS-FM in Bahía de Tortugas, Baja California Sur
- XHCCBI-FM in Ixtlán del Río, Nayarit
- XHCUE-FM in Cuerámaro, Guanajuato
- XHCW-FM in Los Mochis, Sinaloa
- XHD-FM in Ixmiquilpan, Hidalgo
- XHDNG-FM in Durango, Durango
- XHEP-FM in Mexico City
- XHFI-FM in Chihuahua, Chihuahua
- XHITA-FM in Sonoyta, Sonora
- XHJMG-FM in Cuernavaca, Morelos
- XHLUV-FM in Luvianos, State of Mexico
- XHMSN-FM in Cadereyta, Nuevo León
- XHOP-FM in Villahermosa, Tabasco
- XHPNOC-FM in Asunción Nochixtlán, Oaxaca
- XHRN-FM in Veracruz, Veracruz
- XHTLAX-FM in Tlaxcala, Tlaxcala
- XHZER-FM in Zacatecas, Zacatecas

== Morocco ==
- MFM Radio in Agadir

== Philippines ==
- DWRJ in Tuguegarao, Cagayan
- DWBN in Naga City
- DYKB in Kalibo, Aklan
- DYAE in Maasin City

== United Kingdom ==
- Capital Midlands in Mansfield
- Greatest Hits Radio Dumfries & Galloway in Stranraer
- Greatest Hits Radio Lancashire in Blackpool
- Heart West in Marlborough and Taunton

== United States (Channel 243) ==
- KAJD-LP in Baton Rouge, Louisiana
- KBDN in Bandon, Oregon
- KBKZ in Raton, New Mexico
- KBUX in Quartzsite, Arizona
- KBYZ in Bismarck, North Dakota
- KCYS in Seaside, Oregon
- KDAP in Douglas, Arizona
- KDGW-LP in Grants Pass, Oregon
- KDHJ-LP in San Antonio, Texas
- KDUA-LP in Rogers, Arkansas
- KDZN in Glendive, Montana
- KECO in Elk City, Oklahoma
- KFLS in Tulelake, California
- KFNZ-FM in Kansas City, Missouri
- KFTE in Breaux Bridge, Louisiana
- KFXE in Ingram, Texas
- KGDQ-LP in McAllen, Texas
- KHMX in Houston, Texas
- KHTE in England, Arkansas
- KIKO-FM in Claypool, Arizona
- KJAQ in Seattle, Washington
- KJBL in Julesburg, Colorado
- KJIV in Madras, Oregon
- KJJK in Fergus Falls, Minnesota
- KKIS-FM in Soldotna, Alaska
- KKNM in Bovina, Texas
- KKSY in Cedar Rapids, Iowa
- KLCA in Tahoe City, California
- KLDK-LP in Dixon, New Mexico
- KLIX in Twin Falls, Idaho
- KLLM in Wheatland, Wyoming
- KLMA in Hobbs, New Mexico
- KLTG in Corpus Christi, Texas
- KMMY in Soper, Oklahoma
- KNRX in Sterling City, Texas
- KNWC in Sioux Falls, South Dakota
- KOIT in San Francisco, California
- KOZE in Lewiston, Idaho
- KPIK-LP in Stayton, Oregon
- KQIX-LP in Perryville, Arkansas
- KQSW in Rock Springs, Wyoming
- KRAV in Tulsa, Oklahoma
- KRGI in Grand Island, Nebraska
- KSLV-FM in Del Norte, Colorado
- KSOM in Audubon, Iowa
- KSOZ-LP in Salem, Missouri
- KSPW in Sparta, Missouri
- KUBU-LP in Sacramento, California
- KVCZ-LP in Brownsville, Texas
- KVKI-FM in Shreveport, Louisiana
- KWWK in Rochester, Minnesota
- KXPK in Evergreen, Colorado
- KYXY in San Diego, California
- KZAA-LP in Santa Barbara, California
- KZKY in Ashton, Idaho
- KZZE-LP in Fort Thompson, South Dakota
- WAIH in Holly Springs, Mississippi
- WAKS in Akron, Ohio
- WASB-LP in Stanley-Boyd-Cadott, Wisconsin
- WAZY-FM in Lafayette, Indiana
- WBBL in Richton, Mississippi
- WBFG (FM) in Parker's Crossroads, Tennessee
- WBHC-LP in Benton Harbor, Michigan
- WBKX in Fredonia, New York
- WCMF in Rochester, New York
- WCTG in West Pocomoke, Maryland
- WDOD in Chattanooga, Tennessee
- WFLB in Laurinburg, North Carolina
- WFTK in Lebanon, Ohio
- WFVR-LP in South Royalton, Vermont
- WGZB in Lanesville, Indiana
- WIGS-LP in Jellico, Tennessee
- WIGV-LP in Providence, Rhode Island
- WIHB-FM in Gray, Georgia
- WIMR-LP in Mcintosh, Florida
- WJCL in Savannah, Georgia
- WJTK in Columbia City, Florida
- WKDJ-FM in Clarksdale, Mississippi
- WKIB in Anna, Illinois
- WKLH in Milwaukee, Wisconsin
- WKLK in Cloquet, Minnesota
- WKLR in Fort Lee, Virginia
- WKYE in Johnstown, Pennsylvania
- WLRE-LP in Elloree, South Carolina
- WLUL-LP in Thomasville, North Carolina
- WLWF in Marseilles, Illinois
- WMJJ in Birmingham, Alabama
- WMLL in Bedford, New Hampshire
- WMWA in Malone, New York
- WNWX in Rhinelander, Wisconsin
- WOEX in Orlando, Florida
- WOXL in Biltmore Forest, North Carolina
- WPEL in Montrose, Pennsylvania
- WPOW in Miami, Florida
- WQHH in Dewitt, Michigan
- WRQY in Moundsville, West Virginia
- WRXD in Fajardo, Puerto Rico
- WSLR-LP in Sarasota, Florida
- WTDA-LP in Williamston, North Carolina
- WTDY-FM in Philadelphia, Pennsylvania
- WTGG in Amite, Louisiana
- WTIC in Hartford, Connecticut
- WTOU in Portage, Michigan
- WVZC-LP in Toledo, Ohio
- WXCC in Williamson, West Virginia
- WYVS in Speculator, New York
- WZNS in Fort Walton Beach, Florida
- WZPN in Farmington, Illinois

== Vietnam ==
- VOV2/VOV6 in Some regions, Voice of Vietnam
