= WBHC =

WBHC may refer to:

- WBHC-FM, a radio station (92.1 FM) licensed to Hampton, South Carolina, United States
- WBHC-LP, a low-power radio station (96.5 FM) licensed to Benton Harbor, Michigan, United States
