= WIMR =

WIMR may refer to:

- WIMR-LP, a low-power radio station (96.5 FM) licensed to McIntosh, Florida, United States
- "Wherever I May Roam", a song by Metallica
- Woolmer Instructional Military Railway, the original name of the Longmoor Military Railway
