= XHCUE-FM =

Radio station in Cuerámaro, Guanajuato

Cuerámaro, Guanajuato; Mexico
- Frequency: 96.5 FM
- Branding: Estéreo Sol

Programming
- Format: Community radio

Ownership
- Owner: Por Un Cuerámaro Mejor Comunicado, A.C.

History
- First air date: January 22, 2019
- Former frequencies: 103.3 FM (as a pirate)
- Call sign meaning: CUErámaro

Technical information
- Class: D
- ERP: 50 watts
- HAAT: -110.8 meters
- Transmitter coordinates: 20°37′39″N 101°40′28″W

XHCUE-FM is a community radio station on 96.5 FM in Cuerámaro, Guanajuato. The station is owned by the civil association Por Un Cuerámaro Mejor Comunicado, A.C.

== History ==
Radio Sol was founded in 2007 as a pirate radio station broadcasting on 103.3 MHz, which was seized in 2017 with the civil association being fined. A community concession was approved for XHCUE on October 18, 2017, with the station coming to air 15 months later.
