= KIKO (AM) =

Radio station in Apache Junction, Arizona

- Apache Junction, Arizona; United States
- Frequency: 1340 kHz
- Branding: The Bull

Programming
- Format: Talk
- Affiliations: Radio America; Red Apple Media; Salem Radio Network

Ownership
- Owner: John Low; (1TV.com, Inc.)

History
- First air date: 1958

Technical information
- Licensing authority: FCC
- Facility ID: 72477
- Class: C
- Power: 1,000 watts day; 930 watts night
- Transmitter coordinates: 33°22′56″N 111°32′09″W
- Translator: 99.1 K256DK (Phoenix)

Links
- Public license information: Public file; LMS
- Webcast: Listen Live
- Website: www.bull1340am.com

KIKO (1340 kHz) is an AM radio station licensed to serve Apache Junction, Arizona, United States. The station is owned by 1TV.com, Inc.

== History ==
KIKO was originally licensed to Miami, Arizona, and operated as a full-service station under Willard Shoecraft, who owned the station from its sign-on in 1958 until 1986, and again from 1988 until his death in 2000. The station remained in the Shoecraft family until it was sold to its current owner in 2008. Although the station's construction permit was initially assigned the call letters KMIA, in May 1958 it was changed to KIKO by the Federal Communications Commission.

In December 2007, 1TV.Com (John Low, president) reached an agreement to acquire KIKO and KIKO-FM from Shoecraft Broadcasting for a reported $1.025 million. Broadcasting & Cable reported that the deal called for a $50,000 escrow deposit plus $725,000 cash at closing, then an additional $250,000 upon the FCC's issuance of a construction permit allowing 1TV.com to upgrade the facilities of KIKO-FM to Class C3. The FCC granted this voluntary transfer of license on February 19, 2008.

In 2011, KIKO was issued a U.S. Federal Communications Commission (FCC) construction permit to move to a new transmitter site, change the city of license to Apache Junction, Arizona and decrease night power to 930 watts. It will use a short (85 foot) low-efficiency fiberglass whip antenna. It commenced operations from this site in December 2014, simulcasting sister station KIKO-FM in Claypool until December 2015, when it temporarily went silent and came back with a brokered Spanish Christian format called "Voz y Visión Radio" on December 21, 2015 and added FM translator K247CF 97.3 (licensed to Payson, but broadcasts from Usery Mountain in east Mesa), which experiences considerable interference from co-owned KIKO-FM, broadcasting on the same frequency. KIKO's license for its new facilities were granted on January 12, 2016.

Voz y Visión Radio ended broadcasts over KIKO in late 2017, and was replaced by a temporary simulcast of KIKO-FM. In February 2018, the station changed formats to Classic Country calling itself "The Bull" and simulcasting on translator K246CH at 102.9 FM (licensed to Phoenix, but primarily serving Mesa). On May 7, 2018, the 102.9 translator was shut down, and KIKO programming moved back to K247CF 97.3. In 2019, K247CF switched program sources to co-owned KBSZ "Funny 1260".
