= XHDNG-FM =

Radio station in Durango, Durango, Mexico

XHDNG
- Durango, Durango; Mexico
- Frequency: 96.5 FM
- Branding: La Tremenda

Programming
- Format: Regional Mexican

Ownership
- Owner: Grupo Garza Limón; (Garzalr, S.A. de C.V.)

History
- First air date: 1990
- Call sign meaning: DuraNGo

Technical information
- Licensing authority: CRT
- Class: C1
- ERP: 50,000 watts
- HAAT: 228.8 m (751 ft)

Links
- Webcast: XHDNG 96.5 listen live
- Website: La Tremenda Durango Website

XHDNG is a radio station in Durango, Durango. Broadcasting on 96.5 FM, XHDNG is owned by Grupo Garza Limón and is known as La Tremenda, which offers a Regional Mexican format.

The station officially signed on after receiving its concession on September 13, 1990. It was the first commercial FM station in the state, with XHITD-FM 92.1 having beaten it to air as the first station (though XHITD was not permitted until 1992).

In its early years, it was originally known as "Stereo 97" with music formats in Spanish and English.
