= XHZER-FM =

Radio station in Zacatecas, Zacatecas

- Zacatecas, Zacatecas; Mexico
- Frequency: 96.5 FM
- Branding: La Líder Stereo ZER

Programming
- Format: Regional Mexican

Ownership
- Owner: Grupo Radiofónico ZER; (Arnoldo Rodríguez Zermeño)

History
- First air date: June 22, 1990
- Call sign meaning: Arnoldo Rodríguez Zermeño, owner

Technical information
- Licensing authority: CRT
- Class: C
- ERP: 100 kW
- HAAT: 366 m (1,201 ft)
- Repeaters: XHZER-FM (500 watts) (Fresnillo); XHZER-FM (500 watts) (Jerez)

Links
- Webcast: Listen live
- Website: grupozer.mx/..

XHZER-FM is a radio station in Zacatecas, Zacatecas. Broadcasting on 96.5 FM from a tower on Cerro de la Virgen, XHZER is owned by Grupo Radiofónico ZER and is known as "La Líder Stereo ZER", which offers a Regional Mexican format.

== History ==
XHZER received its concession and officially on June 22, 1990.

== Repeaters ==
XHZER has two 500-watt repeaters in Fresnillo and Jerez.
