= XHLUV-FM =

Community radio station in Luvianos, State of Mexico

Luvianos, State of Mexico; Mexico
- Frequency: 96.5 MHz
- Branding: La Calentana

Programming
- Format: Community radio

Ownership
- Owner: La Calentana Luvimex, A.C.

History
- First air date: November 20, 2013 (pirate); October 25, 2016 (with new concession)
- Call sign meaning: LUVianos

Technical information
- Class: A
- ERP: 2.77 kW
- HAAT: -159.4 meters
- Transmitter coordinates: 18°55′13.4″N 100°18′02.4″W

Links
- Website: www.radioluvianos.com

XHLUV-FM is a community radio station in Luvianos, State of Mexico. Broadcasting on 96.5 FM, XHLUV is owned by La Calentana Luvimex, A.C.

== History ==
"Calentana Mexiquense" was founded by Indalecio Benítez Mondragón, beginning operations on November 20, 2013. The station, which was unauthorized and did not hold a permit, broadcast on 98.1 MHz with a 20-watt transmitter.

On August 1, 2014, Calentana Mexiquense was attacked by a gunman who fired several shots into the studios, located in the Benítez family home; Benítez's 12-year-old child, Juan Diego, was shot and killed in the attack. Indalecio and his family moved to Mexico City in the wake of the attack, and two months later, they began the process of applying for a concession.

Calentana Mexiquense's status as a pirate made it vulnerable to an eventual confiscation and forced shutdown, which is what happened on October 15, 2015, when representatives of the Federal Telecommunications Institute (IFT), Federal Police and the Mexican Navy seized Calentana Mexiquense and all of its studio and transmission equipment. At the time of the seizure, a blind host was on air, and the legal notice served on the station was not read to him. In the wake of the seizure, Benítez protested outside the IFT's offices; he had already been told that when he got a concession, he would be moving to a new frequency, 96.5 MHz.

In June 2016, the station, legally incorporated as La Calentana Luvimex, A.C., was unanimously approved by the IFT to receive a concession for a social-community radio station, just the third authorized in the country. With this new concession came not only the move to 96.5, but a power increase from 20 watts to 3,000 and the official callsign of XHLUV-FM. While the station claims itself to be the first authorized community radio station in Mexico, that honor belongs to XHSILL-FM in Hermosillo, which was awarded its social-community concession four months earlier. On the evening of October 25, XHLUV came to air on 96.5 FM.
