= List of radio stations in Vietnam =

Below is a list of stations broadcasting FM radio broadcasting channels in Vietnam, including channels that are currently broadcasting, have been broadcast and channels in FM frequency old, including radio channels of Voice of Vietnam, local stations and radio stations of communes and districts of provinces/cities, and divided by regions in Vietnam.

== Northwest ==
Province	Transmitter stations	FM Frequency (mhz)	Channels name	Reference
Lào Cai	Đài PTTH Lào Cai	91.5	VOV GT	
Lào Cai	Đài Truyền thanh huyện Mường Khương	88	Mường Khương + VOV1/VOV3	
Lào Cai	Đài Truyền thanh Bảo Yên	88.3	Bảo Yên	
Lào Cai	Đài Truyền thanh Thị xã Sapa	89	Sapa	
Lào Cai	Đài truyền thanh TP Lào Cai	89	TP Lào Cai	
Lào Cai	Đài truyền thanh TP Sapa	88.5	Sapa	
Lào Cai	Đài truyền thanh TP Lào Cai	89.5	TP Lào Cai	
Lào Cai	Đài Truyền thanh Huyện Bảo Thắng	90.2	Bảo Thắng	
Lào Cai	Đài PTTH Lào Cai	90.5	VOV1	
Lào Cai	Đài Truyền thanh huyện Si Ma Cai	90.5	Si Ma Cai	
Lào Cai	Đài PTTH Lào Cai	91	Lào Cai Dân Tộc	
Lào Cai	Đài PTTH Lào Cai	94	VOV1	
Lào Cai	Đài PTTH Lào Cai	101 (cũ); 95.3	VOV3	
Lào Cai	Đài PTTH Lào Cai	97	Lào Cai	
Lào Cai	Đài PTTH Lào Cai	103.5 (cũ); 98	VOV2	
Lào Cai	Đài PTTH Lào Cai	98.3	VOV1	
Lào Cai	Trạm phát sóng FM Bắc Hà	98.3	VOV2, Lào Cai (Bắc Hà)	
Lào Cai	Đài PTTH Lào Cai	99.1	VOV4	
Lào Cai	Đài Phát thanh huyện Văn Bàn	100.5	Văn Bàn	
Lào Cai	Đài Phát thanh huyện Bảo Thắng	102	Bảo Thắng	
Lào Cai	Đài PTTH Lào Cai	102.5	VOV3	
Lào Cai	Đài Phát thanh TP Lào Cai	105	TP Lào Cai	
Lào Cai	Đài Phát thanh huyện Bát Xát	106	Bát Xát	
Lào Cai	Đài Phát thanh TX Sapa	107	Sapa	
Lào Cai	Đài Phát thanh TX Sapa	107.2	Sapa	
Lào Cai	Đài Phát thanh TX Sapa	107.5	Sapa	
Lai Châu	Đài Phát thanh huyện Tam Đường	88	Tam Đường	
Lai Châu	Đài Phát thanh huyện Mường Tè	101.5; 93.4	Mường Tè	
Lai Châu	Đài PTTH Lai Châu	94.1	Lai Châu	
Lai Châu	Đài Phát thanh huyện Sìn Hồ	94.7	Sìn Hồ	
Lai Châu	Đài Phát thanh huyện Mường Tè	95	Mường Tè	
Lai Châu	Đài Phát thanh huyện Tam Đường	95.5	Tam Đường	
Lai Châu	Trạm phát sóng FM Sìn Hồ	96.5	VOV2 (Sìn Hồ)	
Lai Châu	Đài Phát thanh huyện Phong Thổ; Trạm phát sóng FM Mường Tè	97	Phong Thổ; VOV1 (Mường Tè)	
Lai Châu	Đài PTTH Lai Châu	98	VOV1	
Lai Châu	Đài Phát thanh huyện Sìn Hồ	98.5	Sìn Hồ	
Lai Châu	Đài Phát thanh huyện Tân Uyên	99	Tân Uyên	
Lai Châu	Trạm phát sóng FM Sìn Hồ	100	VOV1, VOV4 (Sìn Hồ)	
Lai Châu	Đài PTTH Lai Châu	101.5	VOV2	Mường Tè cũ
Lai Châu	Trạm phát sóng FM Sìn Hồ	103.5	VOV1 (Sìn Hồ)	
Điện Biên	Đài PTTH Điện Biên	98 102.7	VOV3	cũ
Điện Biên	Đài PTTH Điện Biên	90.5	VOV4	
Điện Biên	Đài Phát thanh huyện Mường Chà	87.5	Mường Chà	
Điện Biên	Đài Phát thanh TP Điện Biên	89.6	TP Điện Biên	
Điện Biên	Đài Phát thanh huyện Tủa Chùa	91.7	Tủa Chùa	
Điện Biên	Đài Phát thanh huyện Tuần Giáo	92.7	Điện Biên (Tuần Giáo)	
Điện Biên	Đài Phát thanh huyện Điện Biên	93	H.Điện Biên	
Điện Biên	Đài Phát thanh huyện Nặm Pô	94	Nặm Pô	
Điện Biên	Đài Phát thanh huyện Điện Biên Đông	94.2	Điện Biên Đông	
Điện Biên	Trạm phát sóng FM Tuần Giáo	94.9	VOV1 (Tuần Giáo)	
Điện Biên	Đài Phát thanh huyện Tuần Giáo	95	Tuần Giáo	
Điện Biên	Đài PTTH Điện Biên	96.3	Điện Biên	
Điện Biên	Đài PTTH Điện Biên	96.5	VOV2	Mường Nhé & TP. Điện Biên
Điện Biên	Đài PTTH Điện Biên	97.5 ⏩ 95	VOV1	Mường Nhé
Điện Biên	Đài Phát thanh huyện Tủa Chùa	98.9	Tủa Chùa	
Điện Biên	Đài PTTH Điện Biên	100	VOV3 (cũ); VOV1	
Điện Biên	Đài Phát thanh huyện Mường Ảng	100	Mường Ảng	
Điện Biên	Đài PTTH Điện Biên	100.5; 98	VOV2, VOV4	TP Điện Biên
Điện Biên	Đài Phát thanh huyện Mường Ảng	103.5	Mường Ảng	
Sơn La	Trạm phát sóng H. Phù Yên	95	VOV1	Phù Yên
Sơn La	Trạm phát sóng H. Phù Yên	97	VOV4	Phù Yên
Sơn La	Trạm phát sóng FM Sông Mã và Đèo Pha Đin	94	VOV1	Sông Mã & Đèo Pha Đin
Sơn La	Trạm phát sóng FM Sông Mã	96.5	VOV2	Sông Mã
Sơn La	Đài Phát thanh huyện Quỳnh Nhai	97.4	Quỳnh Nhai	
Sơn La	Đài Phát thanh huyện Bắc Yên	93	Bắc Yên	
Sơn La	Đài Phát thanh huyện Sốp Cộp	107.1	Sốp Cộp	
Sơn La	Đài Phát thanh huyện Mai Sơn	100	Mai Sơn; VOV1 (Sốp Cộp)	
Sơn La	Đài Phát thanh huyện Bắc Yên	98	Bắc Yên	
Sơn La	Đài Phát thanh huyện Yên Châu	100	Yên Châu	
Sơn La	Đài Phát thanh huyện Mường La	91.5	Mường La	
Sơn La	Đài Phát thanh huyện Mường La	100	Mường La	
Sơn La	Đài Phát thanh huyện Mường La	102	Mường La	
Sơn La	Đài Phát thanh huyện Phù Yên	92	Phù Yên	
Sơn La	Đài Phát thanh huyện Phù Yên	106.5	Phù Yên	
Sơn La	Đài Phát thanh huyện Phù Yên	100	Phù Yên	
Sơn La	Đài PTTH Sơn La	96	Sơn La	
Sơn La	Trạm phát sóng FM Mộc Châu	100 ⏩ 97.6	VOV1, VOV2 (Mộc Châu)	
Sơn La	Đài Phát thanh huyện Mộc Châu	97.2	Mộc Châu	
Sơn La	Đài Phát thanh huyện Vân Hồ	99	Vân Hồ	
Sơn La	Đài Phát thanh huyện Vân Hồ	101	Vân Hồ	
Sơn La	Đài Phát thanh huyện Thuận Châu	89.1	Thuận Châu	
Sơn La	Đài Phát thanh huyện Thuận Châu	103.1	Thuận Châu	
Sơn La	Đài PTTH Sơn La	95 ⏩ 99	VOV1	
Sơn La	Đài PTTH Sơn La	101	VOV3	
Sơn La	Đài PTTH Sơn La	104.3 (cũ); 103.5	VOV2, VOV4	
Sơn La	Trạm phát sóng Đèo Pha Đin	97	VOV4	Đèo Pha Đin
Sơn La	Trạm phát sóng Đèo Pha Đin	101	VOV1	Đèo Pha Đin
Sơn La	Đài Phát thanh huyện Sông Mã	88.4	Sông Mã	
Sơn La	Trạm phát sóng FM Sông Mã	100	VOV1 (Sông Mã)	
Sơn La	Đài Phát thanh huyện Mai Sơn	97.7	Sơn La (Mai Sơn)	
Sơn La	Trạm phát sóng FM huyện Mai Sơn	96.2	VOV1, VOV2 (Mai Sơn)	
Sơn La	Đài Phát thanh huyện Yên Châu	91	Yên Châu	
Sơn La	Đài Phát thanh huyện Yên Châu	89.2	Yên Châu	
Sơn La	Đài Phát thanh huyện Mường La	89.6	Sơn La (Mường La)	
Sơn La	Đài Phát thanh huyện Yên Châu	106	Yên Châu	
Sơn La	Đài PTTH Sơn La	97	VOV1, VOV4	
Sơn La	Đài Phát thanh TP Sơn La	94	TP Sơn La	

== Northeast ==
Province	Transmitter stations	FM Frequency (mhz)	Channels name	Reference
Cao Bằng	Trạm phát sóng FM Phja Oắc - Nguyên Bình	97	VOV4	
Cao Bằng	Đài Phát thanh huyện Thạch An và Trà Lĩnh	88	Thạch An, Trà Lĩnh	
Cao Bằng	Đài Phát thanh huyện Bảo Lâm	88.4	Bảo Lâm	
Cao Bằng	Trạm phát sóng FM Hà Quảng	90.6	VOV1 (Hà Quảng)	
Cao Bằng	Đài Phát thanh huyện Hòa An	90.8	Hòa An	
Cao Bằng	Đài Phát thanh huyện Thạch An	91	Thạch An	
Cao Bằng	Đài Phát thanh huyện Hà Quảng	92	Hà Quảng	
Cao Bằng	Đài Phát thanh huyện Thông Nông	92.1	Thông Nông	
Cao Bằng	Trạm phát sóng FM Phja Oắc - Nguyên Bình	94	VOV1	
Cao Bằng	Đài Phát thanh huyện Bảo Lạc	94	Bảo Lạc	
Cao Bằng	Trạm phát sóng FM Phja Oắc (cũ)	97; 94.1	VOV1	
Cao Bằng	Đài Phát thanh huyện Phục Hòa -> Quảng Hòa	94.5	Phục Hòa -> Quảng Hòa	
Cao Bằng	Đài Phát thanh huyện Hạ Lang	94.7	Hạ Lang	
Cao Bằng	Đài Phát thanh huyện Nguyên Bình	95	Nguyên Bình	
Cao Bằng	Đài Phát thanh huyện Trà Lĩnh và Hòa An	96	Trà Lĩnh, Hòa An	
Cao Bằng	Đài Phát thanh huyện Thông Nông	96.2	Thông Nông	
Cao Bằng	Đài Phát thanh huyện Hạ Lang	96.5	Hạ Lang	
Cao Bằng	Đài Phát thanh huyện Bảo Lạc	97.4	Bảo Lạc	
Cao Bằng	Đài Phát thanh huyện Trùng Khánh và Hòa An	97.7	Trùng Khánh, Hòa An	
Cao Bằng	Đài Phát thanh huyện Hạ Lang và Hà Quảng	98.1	Hạ Lang, Hà Quảng	
Cao Bằng	Đài PTTH Cao Bằng	99 (cũ)	Cao Bằng	
Cao Bằng	Đài PTTH Cao Bằng	99.9	Cao Bằng	
Cao Bằng	Trạm phát sóng FM Phja Oắc - Nguyên Bình	101.5 (cũ); 103.5	VOV2, VOV4 (Nguyên Bình)	
Cao Bằng	Đài Phát thanh TP Cao Bằng	104	TP Cao Bằng	
Cao Bằng	Đài Phát thanh huyện Phục Hòa -> Quảng Hòa	105	Phục Hòa -> Quảng Hòa	
Cao Bằng	Đài Phát thanh huyện Bảo Lâm	107.5; 107.9	Bảo Lâm	
Cao Bằng	Trạm phát sóng FM Phja Oắc	100.5	VOV3	
Lạng Sơn	Trạm phát sóng FM Mẫu Sơn	101 ⏩ 95	VOV1	
Lạng Sơn	Trạm phát sóng FM Mẫu Sơn	101	VOV3	
Lạng Sơn	Đài PTTH Lạng Sơn; Trạm phát sóng FM Mẫu Sơn	88.2; 88.6; 89.3; 101	Lạng Sơn	
Lạng Sơn	Trạm phát sóng FM Mẫu Sơn	91.5	VOV Giao thông	
Lạng Sơn	Đài Phát thanh huyện Hữu Lũng	93.9	Hữu Lũng	
Lạng Sơn	Đài Phát thanh huyện Bắc Sơn	94.5	Bắc Sơn	
Lạng Sơn	Trạm phát sóng FM Mẫu Sơn	92.5; 95	VOV1, VOV4 (Mẫu Sơn)	
Lạng Sơn	Đài Phát thanh huyện Bình Gia	95.3	Bình Gia	
Lạng Sơn	Đài Phát thanh huyện Chi Lăng	96	Chi Lăng	
Lạng Sơn	Đài Phát thanh huyện Lộc Bình	96.7	Lộc Bình	
Lạng Sơn	Đài Phát thanh huyện Tràng Định	97	Tràng Định	
Lạng Sơn	Trạm phát sóng FM Mẫu Sơn	93.5; 99.5	VOV2 (Mẫu Sơn)	
Lạng Sơn	Đài Phát thanh huyện TP Lạng Sơn	89.3	TP Lạng Sơn	
Lạng Sơn	Trạm phát sóng FM Mẫu Sơn	101	VOV1	Mẫu Sơn
Lạng Sơn	Trạm phát sóng FM Mẫu Sơn	93,5	VOV2	Mẫu Sơn
Lạng Sơn	Trạm phát sóng FM Mẫu Sơn	92,5	VOV3	Mẫu Sơn
Tuyên Quang	Đài PTTH Tuyên Quang	88	VOV1, VOV4 (cũ)	
Tuyên Quang	Đài PTTH Tuyên Quang	91	VOV Giao thông	
Tuyên Quang	Đài Phát thanh TP Tuyên Quang	91.1	TP Tuyên Quang	
Tuyên Quang	Đài Phát thanh huyện Chiêm Hóa và Lâm Bình	92.1	VOV3/Chiêm Hóa; Lâm Bình	
Tuyên Quang	Đài Phát thanh huyện Yên Sơn	92.6	Yên Sơn	
Tuyên Quang	Đài Phát thanh huyện Na Hang	94.1	Na Hang	
Tuyên Quang	Đài PTTH Tuyên Quang	95.6	Tuyên Quang	
Tuyên Quang	Đài PTTH Tuyên Quang	96.5	VOV2	
Tuyên Quang	Đài Phát thanh huyện Hàm Yên và Na Hang	97.6	Hàm Yên; Na Hang/VOV2	
Tuyên Quang	Đài Phát thanh huyện Sơn Dương	98	Sơn Dương	
Tuyên Quang	Đài Phát thanh huyện Chiêm Hóa	99.6	Chiêm Hóa	
Tuyên Quang	Đài PTTH Tuyên Quang	100	VOV1	
Tuyên Quang	Đài Phát thanh huyện Chiêm Hóa	100.1	Chiêm Hóa	
Tuyên Quang	Đài Phát thanh huyện Sơn Dương	102	Sơn Dương	
Tuyên Quang		102.7	VOV3	
Thái Nguyên	Đài Phát thanh huyện Định Hóa	92.3	Định Hóa	
Thái Nguyên	Đài Phát thanh huyện Phổ Yên	94.4	Phổ Yên	
Thái Nguyên	Đài Phát thanh huyện Phú Lương	95.8	Phú Lương	
Thái Nguyên	Đài Phát thanh huyện Đồng Hỷ	97.3	Đồng Hỷ	
Thái Nguyên	Đài Phát thanh huyện Đại Từ	97.6	Đại Từ	
Thái Nguyên	Đài Phát thanh huyện Sông Công	103.2	Sông Công	
Thái Nguyên	Đài Phát thanh huyện Phú Bình	103.7	Phú Bình	
Thái Nguyên	Đài PTTH Thái Nguyên	106.5	Thái Nguyên	
Phú Thọ	Đài Phát thanh huyện Tân Sơn	87.9	Tân Sơn	
Phú Thọ	Đài Phát thanh huyện Hạ Hòa	89.1	Hạ Hòa	
Phú Thọ	Đài Phát thanh huyện Thanh Ba	90.5	Thanh Ba	
Phú Thọ	Đài Phát thanh huyện Thanh Sơn	91.4	Thanh Sơn	
Phú Thọ	Đài Phát thanh huyện Cẩm Khê	91.5	Cẩm Khê	
Phú Thọ	Đài Phát thanh TP Việt Trì	93.5	Việt Trì	
Phú Thọ	Đài Phát thanh huyện Yên Lập	94	Yên Lập	
Phú Thọ	Đài Phát thanh huyện Phù Ninh	95.9	Phù Ninh	
Phú Thọ	Đài Phát thanh huyện Thanh Thủy	97.2	Thanh Thủy	
Phú Thọ	Đài Phát thanh huyện Lâm Thao	98.2	Lâm Thao	
Phú Thọ	Đài PTTH Phú Thọ	106	Phú Thọ	
Quảng Ninh	Trạm phát sóng đồi cột 5	91.5	VOV Giao thông (cũ)	
Quảng Ninh	Trạm phát sóng đồi cột 5	101.5	VOV3	
Quảng Ninh	Trạm phát sóng đồi cột 5	94	VOV1	cũ
Quảng Ninh	Trạm phát sóng đồi cột 5	94	VOV3 cũ	TP. Hạ Long
Quảng Ninh	Đài Phát thanh huyện Đông Triều	88.3	Đông Triều	
Quảng Ninh	Đài Phát thanh huyện Cô Tô	89.2	Cô Tô	
Quảng Ninh	Đài Phát thanh huyện Tiên Yên	89.5	Tiên Yên	
Quảng Ninh	Đài Phát thanh huyện Bình Liêu	89.8	Bình Liêu	
Quảng Ninh	Đài Phát thanh huyện Hải Hà	89.9	Hải Hà	
Quảng Ninh	Đài Phát thanh huyện Đầm Hà	91	Quảng Ninh (Đầm Hà)	
Quảng Ninh	Đài Phát thanh TP Hạ Long	91.4	TP Hạ Long	
Quảng Ninh	Đài Phát thanh huyện Vân Đồn	91.7	Vân Đồn	
Quảng Ninh	Đài Phát thanh huyện Ba Chẽ và TP Móng Cái	92	Móng Cái, Ba Chẽ	
Quảng Ninh	Đài Phát thanh huyện Quảng Yên	92.1	Quảng Yên	
Quảng Ninh	Trạm phát sóng FM Than Cọc Sáu	92.5	Quảng Ninh (Than Cọc Sáu)	
Quảng Ninh	Đài Phát thanh huyện Bình Liêu; Trạm phát sóng đồi cột 5	94	Bình Liêu; VOV1; VOVGT	
Quảng Ninh	Trạm phát sóng đồi cột 5	94.7	Quảng Ninh 2	
Quảng Ninh	Đài Phát thanh TP Móng Cái	95	Móng Cái	
Quảng Ninh	Đài Phát thanh huyện Hoành Bồ	95.1	Hoành Bồ	
Quảng Ninh	Đài Phát thanh huyện Hải Hà	96	Hải Hà	
Quảng Ninh	Trạm phát sóng FM Đồi cột 5	93; 96.5	VOV2, VOV4	
Quảng Ninh	Đài Phát thanh huyện Ba Chẽ	96.7	Ba Chẽ	
Quảng Ninh	Trạm phát sóng đồi cột 5	97.8	Quảng Ninh 1	
Quảng Ninh	Đài Phát thanh huyện Vân Đồn	99	Vân Đồn	
Quảng Ninh	Trạm phát sóng đồi cột 5	99.5	VOV1 (cũ)	
Quảng Ninh	Trạm phát sóng đồi cột 5 Đài Phát thanh huyện Uông Bí	99.8	Quảng Ninh; Uông Bí	
Quảng Ninh	Đài Phát thanh huyện Vân Đồn; Trạm phát sóng đồi cột 5	100	VOV1	Vân Đồn & Hạ Long
Quảng Ninh	Đài Phát thanh TP Móng Cái	100.7	Quảng Ninh 1 (Móng Cái)	
Quảng Ninh	Trạm phát sóng đồi cột 5	104	VOV 24/7; VOV3 (cũ)	
Quảng Ninh	Trạm phát sóng đồi cột 5	105.7; 105	VOV5	
Quảng Ninh	Trạm phát sóng đồi cột 5	93	VOV5 (cũ)	Hạ Long
Quảng Ninh	Đài Phát thanh TP Móng Cái	103.5 ⏩ 95	VOV1	Móng Cái cũ
Quảng Ninh	Đài Phát thanh TP Móng Cái	101.5 ⏩ 103.5	VOV2	Móng Cái cũ
Quảng Ninh	Đài Phát thanh TP Móng Cái	100.5 ⏩ 101.5	VOV3	Móng Cái
Quảng Ninh	Đài Phát thanh TP Móng Cái	91	VOVGT	Móng Cái

== Red River Delta ==
Province	Transmitter stations	FM Frequency (mhz)	Channels name	Reference
Vĩnh Phúc	Đài truyền thanh huyện Tam Đảo	98.4	Tam Đảo	
Vĩnh Phúc	Đài truyền thanh huyện Yên Lạc	95.4	Yên Lạc	
Vĩnh Phúc	Đài truyền thanh TP Vĩnh Yên	95	TP. Vĩnh Yên	
Vĩnh Phúc	Đài truyền thanh TX Phúc Yên	88.1	TX Phúc Yên	
Vĩnh Phúc	Đài truyền thanh huyện Tam Dương	88.4	Tam Dương	
Vĩnh Phúc	Đài truyền thanh huyện Lập Thạch	97.8	Lập Thạch	
Vĩnh Phúc	Đài PTTH Vĩnh Phúc	100.7	Vĩnh Phúc	
Vĩnh Phúc	Đài truyền thanh huyện Bình Xuyên	93	Bình Xuyên	
Vĩnh Phúc	Đài truyền thanh huyện Vĩnh Tường	90.7	Vĩnh Tường	
Vĩnh Phúc	Đài truyền thanh huyện Sông Lô	104.6	Sông Lô	
Vĩnh Phúc	Trạm phát sóng Tam Đảo	102.5 ⏩ 100	VOV1	
Vĩnh Phúc	Trạm phát sóng Tam Đảo	91	VOV Giao thông	
Vĩnh Phúc	Trạm phát sóng Tam Đảo	96.5	VOV2	
Vĩnh Phúc	Trạm phát sóng Tam Đảo	89 ⏩ 102.7	VOV3	
Hà Nội	Sóng từ Tam Đảo	100	VOV1	
Hà Nội	Sóng từ Tam Đảo	96.5	VOV2	
Hà Nội	Sóng từ Tam Đảo	102.7	VOV3	
Hà Nội	Đài Phát thanh quốc gia Mễ Trì	105.5	VOV5	
Hà Nội	Đài Phát thanh quốc gia Mễ Trì	91	VOV Giao thông/VOV5 cũ	
Hà Nội	Mễ Trì cũ	92	VOV4	
Hà Nội	Đài Phát thanh quốc gia Mễ Trì	89	VOV FM89	
Hà Nội	Đài Phát thanh quốc gia Mễ Trì	104	VOV TA 24/7	
Hà Nội	Đài Phát thanh truyền hình Hà Nội	90	Hà Nội	
Hà Nội	Đài PTTH Hà Nội (cơ sở Hà Đông)	96	Hà Nội (Hà Tây cũ)	
Hà Nội	Đài PTTH Hà Nội	98.9	JOY FM -> ON 365FM	
Hà Nội	Đài Phát thanh quận Hà Đông	106.4	Hà Đông	
Hà Nội	Đài Phát thanh huyện Thanh Trì	94.3	Thanh Trì	
Hà Nội	Đài Phát thanh huyện Gia Lâm	91.5	Gia Lâm	
Hà Nội	Đài Phát thanh huyện Phú Xuyên	95.5	Phú Xuyên	
Hà Nội	Đài Phát thanh huyện Đông Anh	96.6; 99.4	Đông Anh	
Hà Nội	Đài Phát thanh huyện Chương Mỹ	98	Chương Mỹ	
Hà Nội	Đài Phát thanh huyện Sóc Sơn	93.8	Sóc Sơn	
Hà Nội	Đài Phát thanh huyện Ba Vì	94.6	Ba Vì	
Hà Nội	Đài Phát thanh huyện Thạch Thất	95.1	Thạch Thất	
Hà Nội	Đài Phát thanh huyện Phúc Thọ	92.4	Phúc Thọ	
Hà Nội	Đài Phát thanh huyện Thanh Oai	103.7	Thanh Oai	
Hà Nội	Đài Phát thanh huyện Từ Liêm (cũ)	91.8	Từ Liêm (cũ)	
Hà Nội	Đài Phát thanh huyện Đan Phượng	98.2	Đan Phượng	
Hà Nội	Đài Phát thanh huyện Hoài Đức	88.5	Hoài Đức	
Hà Nội	Đài Phát thanh huyện Mỹ Đức	96.7	Mỹ Đức	
Hà Nội	Đài Phát thanh huyện Quốc Oai	102	Quốc Oai	
Hà Nội	Đài Phát thanh huyện Thường Tín	67.13 -> 104.9	Thường Tín	
Hà Nội	Đài Phát thanh TX Sơn Tây	93.6	TX. Sơn Tây	
Hà Nội	Đài Phát thanh huyện Ứng Hòa	92.0 -> 94.1	Ứng Hòa	
Bắc Ninh	Đài Phát thanh huyện Gia Bình	106.2	Gia Bình	
Bắc Ninh	Đài Phát thanh huyện Lương Tài	97.5	Lương Tài	
Bắc Ninh	Đài PTTH Bắc Ninh	92.1	Bắc Ninh	
Bắc Ninh	Đài Phát thanh TX Từ Sơn	103.7	TX. Từ Sơn	
Bắc Ninh	Đài Phát thanh huyện Thuận Thành	93.9	Thuận Thành	
Bắc Ninh	Đài Phát thanh huyện Quế Võ	94.8	Quế Võ	
Bắc Ninh	Đài Phát thanh TP Bắc Ninh	107	TP Bắc Ninh	
Bắc Ninh	Đài Phát thanh huyện Yên Phong	101.3	Yên Phong	
Bắc Ninh	Đài Phát thanh huyện Tiên Du	88.3	Tiên Du	
Bắc Ninh	Đài PTTH Bắc Ninh	95.4	Bắc Ninh	
Hải Dương	Đài Phát thanh TP Hải Dương	93.4	TP. Hải Dương	
Hải Dương	Đài Phát thanh huyện Tứ Kỳ	89.6	Tứ Kỳ	
Hải Dương	Đài Phát thanh huyện Gia Lộc	97.8	Gia Lộc	
Hải Dương	Đài Phát thanh TP Chí Linh	93.1	Chí Linh	
Hải Dương	Đài Phát thanh truyền hình Hải Dương	104.5	Hải Dương	
Hải Dương	Đài Phát thanh huyện Nam Sách	90.2	Nam Sách	
Hải Dương	Đài Phát thanh huyện Kinh Môn	101.5	Kinh Môn	
Hải Dương	Đài Phát thanh huyện Cẩm Giàng	99	Cẩm Giàng	
Hải Dương	Đài Phát thanh huyện Bình Giang	101.2	Bình Giang	
Hải Dương	Đài Phát thanh huyện Kim Thành	94.2	Kim Thành	
Hải Dương	Đài Phát thanh huyện Ninh Giang	91.9	Ninh Giang	
Hải Dương	Đài Phát thanh huyện Thanh Hà	95.4	Thanh Hà	
Hải Dương	Đài Phát thanh huyện Thanh Miện	96.8	Thanh Miện	
Hưng Yên	Đài Phát thanh TP Hưng Yên	89.5	TP. Hưng Yên	
Hưng Yên	Đài Phát thanh huyện Kim Động	103	Kim Động	
Hưng Yên	Đài Phát thanh huyện Yên Mỹ	95.3	Yên Mỹ	
Hưng Yên	Đài Phát thanh huyện Khoái Châu	100.5	Khoái Châu	
Hưng Yên	Đài PTTH Hưng Yên	92.7	Hưng Yên	
Hưng Yên	Đài Phát thanh huyện Tiên Lữ	90.6	Tiên Lữ	
Hưng Yên	Đài Phát thanh huyện Văn Lâm	93.8	Văn Lâm	
Hưng Yên	Đài Phát thanh huyện Mỹ Hào	88.6	Mỹ Hào	
Hưng Yên	Đài Phát thanh huyện Ân Thi	91.3	Ân Thi	
Hưng Yên	Đài Phát thanh huyện Phù Cừ	91.4	Phù Cừ	
Hưng Yên	Đài Phát thanh huyện Văn Giang	103.3	Văn Giang	
Hải Phòng	Trạm phát sóng Cát Bà	95	VOV1	
Hải Phòng	Đài truyền thanh huyện Bạch Long Vĩ	88.4	Bạch Long Vĩ	
Hải Phòng	Đài truyền thanh huyện Thủy Nguyên	88.5	Thủy Nguyên	
Hải Phòng	Đài truyền thanh quận An Dương	89.8	An Dương	
Hải Phòng	Đồi Thiên Văn	90.5	VOV5	
Hải Phòng	Đài truyền thanh huyện Cát Hải	90.6	Cát Hải	
Hải Phòng	Đài truyền thanh quận Kiến Thụy	94.3	Kiến Thụy	
Hải Phòng	Đài truyền thanh quận Hải An	99.2	Hải An	
Hải Phòng	Đài truyền thanh quận An Lão	92.8	An Lão	
Hải Phòng	Đài truyền thanh huyện Vĩnh Bảo	87.9	Vĩnh Bảo	
Hải Phòng	Đài truyền thanh TX Đồ Sơn	105	Đồ Sơn	
Hải Phòng	Đài truyền thanh quận Kiến An	93.3	Kiến An	
Hải Phòng	Đài PTTH Hải Phòng	93.7	Hải Phòng	
Hải Phòng	Đài PTTH Hải Phòng	102.2	Hải Phòng (phát thanh Giao thông)	
Hải Phòng	Đài truyền thanh huyện Tiên Lãng	93.7	Tiên Lãng	
Hà Nam	Đài Phát thanh huyện Thanh Liêm	91.8	Thanh Liêm	
Hà Nam	Đài Phát thanh TP Phủ Lý	94.6	TP Phủ Lý	
Hà Nam	Đài Phát thanh huyện Lý Nhân	88.6	Lý Nhân	
Hà Nam	Đài Phát thanh huyện Kim Bảng	90.2	Kim Bảng	
Hà Nam	Đài Phát thanh huyện Bình Lục	92.2	Bình Lục	
Hà Nam	Đài PTTH Hà Nam	93.3	Hà Nam	
Hà Nam	Đài Phát thanh TX Duy Tiên	97.6	TX. Duy Tiên	
Nam Định	Đài Phát thanh huyện Ý Yên	90.6	Ý Yên	
Nam Định	Đài Phát thanh huyện Trực Ninh	94.8	Trực Ninh	
Nam Định	Đài Phát thanh huyện Xuân Trường	94.5	Xuân Trường	
Nam Định	Đài Phát thanh huyện Hải Hậu	92.8	Hải Hậu	
Nam Định	Đài Phát thanh huyện Nghĩa Hưng	92.4	Nghĩa Hưng	
Nam Định	Đài Phát thanh TP Nam Định	96.3	TP.Nam Định	
Nam Định	Đài Phát thanh huyện Giao Thủy	100.4	Giao Thủy	
Nam Định	Đài Phát thanh huyện Nghĩa Hưng	88.4	Nghĩa Hưng	
Nam Định	Đài Phát thanh huyện Vụ Bản	94.2	Vụ Bản	
Nam Định	Đài PTTH Nam Định	95.1	Nam Định	
Nam Định	Đài Phát thanh huyện Nam Trực	97.5	Nam Trực	
Nam Định	Đài Phát thanh huyện Mỹ Lộc	98.2	Mỹ Lộc	
Thái Bình	Đài Phát thanh huyện Quỳnh Phụ	89.3	Quỳnh Phụ	
Thái Bình	Đài Phát thanh huyện Kiến Xương	104.2	Kiến Xương	
Thái Bình	Đài Phát thanh huyện Hưng Hà	93	Hưng Hà	
Thái Bình	Đài Phát thanh huyện Tiền Hải	103.2	Tiền Hải	
Thái Bình	Đài Phát thanh huyện Vũ Thư	88.4	Vũ Thư	
Thái Bình	Đài Phát thanh huyện Đông Hưng	102.4	Đông Hưng	
Thái Bình	Đài Phát thanh TP Thái Bình	88.8	TP. Thái Bình	
Thái Bình	Đài Phát thanh huyện Thái Thụy	97.7	Thái Thụy	
Thái Bình	Đài PTTH Thái Bình	97	Thái Bình	
Ninh Bình	Đài truyền thanh huyện Nho Quan	97.1	Nho Quan	
Ninh Bình	Đài truyền thanh TP Tam Điệp	100.2	TP. Tam Điệp	
Ninh Bình	Đài truyền thanh huyện Hoa Lư	95.7	Hoa Lư	
Ninh Bình	Đài truyền thanh TP Ninh Bình	105.8	TP Ninh Bình	
Ninh Bình	Đài truyền thanh huyện Yên Mô	99.3	Yên Mô	
Ninh Bình	Đài truyền thanh huyện Yên Khánh	88.1	Yên Khánh	
Ninh Bình	Đài truyền thanh huyện Kim Sơn	93.2	Kim Sơn	
Ninh Bình	Đài truyền thanh huyện Gia Viễn	96.2	Gia Viễn	
Ninh Bình	Đài PTTH Ninh Bình	98.1	Ninh Bình	

== North Central ==
Province	Transmitter stations	FM Frequency (mhz)	Channels name	Reference
Thanh Hóa	Trạm phát sóng FM Hòn Mê	100	VOV1	
Thanh Hóa	Trạm phát sóng FM Ngọc Lặc	98.6	VOV1, VOV4	
Thanh Hóa	Trạm phát sóng FM Đồi Quyết Thắng	103	VOV3 (cũ)	
Thanh Hóa	Trạm phát sóng Đồi Quyết Thắng	91.5	VOV Giao thông	Đã dừng phát
Thanh Hóa	Đài truyền thanh huyện Thiệu Hóa	95.5	Thiệu Hóa	
Thanh Hóa	Đài truyền thanh huyện Bá Thước và Như Xuân	94.5	Bá Thước; Như Xuân	
Thanh Hóa	Đài truyền thanh huyện Tĩnh Gia	96	Tĩnh Gia	
Thanh Hóa	Đài truyền thanh huyện Như Xuân	98.3	Như Xuân	
Thanh Hóa	Đài truyền thanh TP Thanh Hóa	93.1	TP Thanh Hóa	
Thanh Hóa	Đài truyền thanh huyện Bá Thước	97.7	Bá Thước	
Thanh Hóa	Đài truyền thanh TX Sầm Sơn	101.1	Sầm Sơn	
Thanh Hóa	Đài truyền thanh TX Bỉm Sơn	93.6	Bỉm Sơn	
Thanh Hóa	Đài truyền thanh huyện Nga Sơn	97.6	Nga Sơn	
Thanh Hóa	Đài truyền thanh huyện Mường Lát	89.6	Mường Lát	
Thanh Hóa	Đài truyền thanh huyện Thường Xuân	98.4; 98.9	Thường Xuân	
Thanh Hóa	Đài truyền thanh huyện Như Xuân	89	Như Xuân	
Thanh Hóa	Đài truyền thanh huyện Hà Trung	90.8	Hà Trung	
Thanh Hóa	Đài truyền thanh huyện Lang Chánh	91.5	Lang Chánh	
Thanh Hóa	Đài truyền thanh huyện Triệu Sơn	97.8	Triệu Sơn	
Thanh Hóa	Đài truyền thanh huyện Bá Thước	102	Thanh Hóa (Bá Thước)	
Thanh Hóa	Đài Phát thanh huyện Nông Công	96.8	Nông Công	
Thanh Hóa	Đài Phát thanh huyện Yên Định	88.6	Yên Định	
Thanh Hóa	Đài Phát thanh huyện Hoằng Hóa	90.3	Hoằng Hóa	
Thanh Hóa	Đài Phát thanh huyện Bá Thước	102.4	Bá Thước	
Thanh Hóa	Trạm phát sóng FM Đồi Quyết Thắng - Đài PTTH Thanh Hóa	92.3	Thanh Hóa	
Thanh Hóa	Đài truyền thanh huyện Ngọc Lặc	100.7	Ngọc Lặc	
Thanh Hóa	Đài truyền thanh huyện Quan Hóa	95.8	Quan Hóa	
Thanh Hóa	Đài truyền thanh huyện Cẩm Thúy	92.8	Cẩm Thúy	
Thanh Hóa	Trạm phát sóng Đồi Quyết Thắng	105.1 (cũ); 103.5	VOV2	
Thanh Hóa	Trạm phát sóng đồi Quyết Thắng	89.5 (cũ); 94	VOV1	
Thanh Hóa	Đài truyền thanh huyện Hậu Lộc	94.6	Hậu Lộc	
Thanh Hóa	Đài truyền thanh huyện Cẩm Thúy	88.2; 90.9	Cẩm Thúy	
Thanh Hóa	Đài truyền thanh huyện Đông Sơn	92.6	Đông Sơn	
Thanh Hóa	Đài truyền thanh huyện Thọ Xuân	97	Thọ Xuân	
Thanh Hóa	Đài truyền thanh huyện Vĩnh Lộc	96.1	Vĩnh Lộc	
Thanh Hóa	Đài truyền thanh huyện Quảng Xương	95.4	Quảng Xương	
Thanh Hóa	Trạm phát sóng FM Bá Thước	94.9 (cũ)	VOV3	
Thanh Hóa	Trạm phát sóng FM Bá Thước	93.1 (cũ); 101.5	VOV4	
Thanh Hóa	Đài truyền thanh huyện Quan Sơn	91.4	Quan Sơn	
Thanh Hóa	Đài truyền thanh huyện Thạch Thành	95.8	Thạch Thành	
Nghệ An	Đài PTTH Nghệ An	93.5	VOV2	
Nghệ An	Đài PTTH Nghệ An	94.2	VOV3	TP.Vinh (cũ)
Nghệ An	Trạm phát sóng FM Con Cuông	100	VOV1	Con Cuông
Nghệ An	Trạm phát sóng FM Quỳ Hợp	100.5	VOV2 (cũ)	Quỳ Hợp
Nghệ An	Trạm phát sóng FM Quỳ Hợp	101.5	VOV1	Quỳ Hợp (cũ)
Nghệ An	Trạm phát sóng FM Quỳ Hợp	95.5	VOV3	Quỳ Hợp cũ
Nghệ An	Trạm phát sóng FM Quỳ Hợp	103	VOV4	Quỳ Hợp cũ
Nghệ An	Trạm phát sóng FM Nghĩa Đàn	97.3	VOV2, VOV4	Nghĩa Đàn cũ
Nghệ An	Trạm phát sóng FM Đô Lương	90.2	VOV2, VOV4	Đô Lương cũ
Nghệ An	Trạm phát sóng FM Tương Dương	104	VOV2 (Tương Dương cũ); VOV3 (Tây Nghệ An)	
Nghệ An	Đài truyền thanh huyện Quỳ Châu	98.9; 90.1	Quỳ Châu	
Nghệ An	Đài truyền thanh huyện Quỳnh Lưu	88.4	Quỳnh Lưu	
Nghệ An	Đài truyền thanh huyện Quế Phong	87.5; 93.2	Quế Phong	
Nghệ An	Đài truyền thanh huyện Nghi Lộc	98.7	Nghi Lộc	
Nghệ An	Đài truyền thanh huyện Quỳ Hợp	92.4	Quỳ Hợp	
Nghệ An	Đài truyền thanh TX Cửa Lò	100.7	TX.Cửa Lò	
Nghệ An	Đài truyền thanh huyện Đô Lương	97.2	Đô Lương	
Nghệ An	Đài truyền thanh huyện Anh Sơn	96.2	Anh Sơn	
Nghệ An	Đài PTTH Nghệ An	99.6	Nghệ An	
Nghệ An	Đài truyền thanh huyện Yên Thành	92.8	Yên Thành	
Nghệ An	Đài truyền thanh huyện Con Cuông	93.5	Con Cuông	
Nghệ An	Đài truyền thanh huyện Tương Dương	94.6	Tương Dương	
Nghệ An	Đài truyền thanh huyện Tân Kỳ	94.5	Tân Kỳ	
Nghệ An	Đài truyền thanh huyện Kỳ Sơn	88	Kỳ Sơn	
Nghệ An	Đài truyền thanh huyện Thanh Chương	94.1	Thanh Chương	
Nghệ An	Đài truyền thanh huyện Diễn Châu	93.4	Diễn Châu	
Nghệ An	Đài truyền thanh huyện Quỳ Châu	89.9	Quỳ Châu	
Nghệ An	Đài truyền thanh huyện Nam Đàn	89.3	Nam Đàn	
Nghệ An	Đài truyền thanh TP Vinh	104.6	TP Vinh	
Nghệ An	Đài truyền thanh huyện Hưng Nguyên	100.2	Hưng Nguyên	
Nghệ An	Đài truyền thanh huyện Thái Hòa	88	Thái Hòa	
Nghệ An	Đài truyền thanh huyện Nghĩa Đàn	90.5	Nghĩa Đàn	
Nghệ An	Trạm phát sóng FM Quế Phong	94	VOV1, VOV4	Quế Phong
Nghệ An	Trạm phát sóng FM Quỳ Hợp và Kỳ Sơn	95	VOV1	Quỳ Hợp, Kỳ Sơn
Nghệ An	Trạm phát sóng FM Tương Dương	103.5	VOV2	Tương Dương
Nghệ An	Trạm phát sóng FM Huồi Tụ, Kỳ Sơn	97	VOV2, VOV4	Huồi Tụ, Kỳ Sơn
Nghệ An	Đài PTTH Nghệ An	98.3	Nghệ An (cũ)	TP. Vinh (cũ)
Hà Tĩnh	Trạm phát sóng FM Hương Khê	94	VOV1	Hương Khê
Hà Tĩnh	Đài PTTH Hà Tĩnh	95	VOV1	TP Hà Tĩnh
Hà Tĩnh	Đài PTTH Hà Tĩnh	92.5	VOV2	TP. Hà Tĩnh
Hà Tĩnh	Trạm phát sóng FM Hương Khê	100.2	VOV2	Hương Khê
Hà Tĩnh	Đài truyền thanh huyện Lộc Hà	94	Lộc Hà	
Hà Tĩnh	Đài PTTH Hà Tĩnh	97.8	Hà Tĩnh	
Hà Tĩnh	Đài truyền thanh TP Hà Tĩnh	92.6	TP Hà Tĩnh	
Hà Tĩnh	Đài truyền thanh huyện Can Lộc	91	Can Lộc	
Hà Tĩnh	Đài truyền thanh huyện Nghi Xuân	90.5	Nghi Xuân	
Hà Tĩnh	Đài truyền thanh huyện Hồng Lĩnh	91.5	Hồng Lĩnh	
Hà Tĩnh	Đài truyền thanh huyện Hương Khê	97.4	Hương Khê	
Hà Tĩnh	Trạm phát sóng FM Hương Khê	99	VOV1	Hương Khê
Hà Tĩnh	Trạm phát sóng Núi Thiên Tượng	101	VOV3	Hồng Lĩnh
Hà Tĩnh	Đài truyền thanh huyện Cẩm Xuyên	95.3	Cẩm Xuyên	
Hà Tĩnh	Đài truyền thanh huyện Thạch Hà	96.2	Thạch Hà	
Hà Tĩnh	Đài truyền thanh TX Kỳ Anh & huyện Hương Sơn	99	TX.Kỳ Anh; Hương Sơn	
Hà Tĩnh	Đài truyền thanh huyện Vũ Quang	106	Vũ Quang	
Hà Tĩnh	Trạm phát sóng FM Núi Thiên Tượng	91	VOV Giao thông	cũ
Hà Tĩnh	Trạm phát sóng Núi Thiên Tượng	96.5	VOV2	Núi Thiên Tượng
Hà Tĩnh	Trạm phát sóng Núi Thiên Tượng	103.5 (cũ); 95	VOV1	Núi Thiên Tượng
Hà Tĩnh	Đài truyền thanh huyện Đức Thọ	94.4	Đức Thọ	
Hà Tĩnh	Trạm phát sóng FM Núi Thiên Tượng	102.7	VOV3	Núi Thiên Tượng
Quảng Bình	Đài PTTH Quảng Bình	91.5	VOV GT (cũ)	TP Đồng Hới
Quảng Bình	Trạm phát sóng FM Minh Hóa	95	VOV1	Minh Hóa
Quảng Bình	Đài truyền thanh TP Đồng Hới	91	Đồng Hới	
Quảng Bình	Trạm phát sóng FM Đài PTTH Quảng Bình	94	VOV3	Đồng Hới
Quảng Bình	Đài truyền thanh huyện Quảng Ninh	98.8	H.Quảng Ninh	
Quảng Bình	Đài truyền thanh TX Ba Đồn	88	TX.Ba Đồn	
Quảng Bình	Đài truyền thanh huyện Tuyên Hóa	92	Quảng Bình	Tuyên Hóa
Quảng Bình	Đài PTTH Quảng Bình	96.1	Quảng Bình	
Quảng Bình	Đài truyền thanh huyện Minh Hóa	94.1	Quảng Bình	Minh Hóa
Quảng Bình	Đài truyền thanh huyện Lệ Thủy	92	Lệ Thủy	
Quảng Bình	Đài truyền thanh huyện Quảng Trạch	90.2	Quảng Trạch	
Quảng Bình	Đài truyền thanh huyện Bố Trạch	93.9	Bố Trạch	
Quảng Bình	Đài PTTH Quảng Bình	93 (cũ); 100	VOV1	Đồng Hới
Quảng Bình	Đài PTTH Quảng Bình	99 (cũ); 103.5	VOV2	Đồng Hới
Quảng Bình	Đài PTTH Quảng Bình	101.5	VOV3	Đồng Hới
Quảng Trị	Trạm phát sóng FM Đài PTTH Quảng Trị	88.5	VOVGT	cũ
Quảng Trị	Đài PTTH Quảng Trị	101	VOV3	
Quảng Trị	Đài PTTH Quảng Trị	96.5	VOV2	
Quảng Trị	Đài truyền thanh huyện Vĩnh Linh	96.8	Vĩnh Linh	
Quảng Trị	Đài truyền thanh TP Đông Hà	97.8	TP Đông Hà	
Quảng Trị	Đài truyền thanh huyện Cồn Cỏ	93.5	Cồn Cỏ	
Quảng Trị	Đài truyền thanh huyện Đắk Rông	96.9	Đắk Rông	
Quảng Trị	Đài truyền thanh huyện Cam Lộ	88.6	Cam Lộ	
Quảng Trị	Đài truyền thanh TX Quảng Trị	99.2	TX Quảng Trị	
Quảng Trị	Đài PTTH Quảng Trị	92.2 ⏩ 92.5	Quảng Trị	
Quảng Trị	Đài truyền thanh huyện Hướng Hóa	97.2	Hướng Hóa	TT Khe Sanh
Quảng Trị	Đài PTTH Quảng Trị	102 ⏩ 94	VOV1	TP Đông Hà
Quảng Trị	Đài PTTH Quảng Trị	89.5	VOV3/VOH + Quảng Trị	
Quảng Trị	Đài truyền thanh Hải Lăng	98	Hải Lăng	
Quảng Trị	Đài PTTH Quảng Trị	102	VOV1	
Quảng Trị	Đài truyền thanh TP Đông Hà	97.8	TP Đông Hà	
Quảng Trị	Đài truyền thanh Huyện Gio Linh	104	Gio Linh	
Quảng Trị	Trạm phát sóng FM Thị trấn Lao Bảo	101.5	VOV4	
Quảng Trị	Trạm phát sóng FM Khe Sanh	100	VOV1	Khe Sanh, Hướng Hóa
Quảng Trị	Công ty Nhật Quang, thị xã Quảng Trị	99.2	TX Quảng Trị	
Thừa Thiên Huế	Trạm phát sóng FM Núi Bạch Mã	87.4 (cũ); 99.5	VOV2	
Thừa Thiên Huế	Đài truyền thanh huyện Phong Điền	88	Phong Điền	
Thừa Thiên Huế	Đài PTTH Thừa Thiên Huế	93.3 ⏩ 93	Thừa Thiên Huế	
Thừa Thiên Huế	Đài PTTH Thừa Thiên Huế	96	VOV1/Thừa Thiên Huế	
Thừa Thiên Huế	Đài Truyền thanh TP Huế	90.7	TP Huế	
Thừa Thiên Huế	Đài truyền thanh huyện Phú Vang	91.9	Phú Vang	
Thừa Thiên Huế	Đài truyền thanh huyện Hậu Lộc	98	Phú Lộc	
Thừa Thiên Huế	Trạm phát sóng FM Núi Bạch Mã	104.5	VOV 24/7	
Thừa Thiên Huế	Trạm phát sóng FM A Lưới	100	VOV1	
Thừa Thiên Huế	Trạm phát sóng FM Núi Bạch Mã	103 (cũ); 101.5 (cũ) -> 102.7	VOV3	
Thừa Thiên Huế	Đài truyền thanh TX Hương Thủy	95.3	TX Hương Thủy	
Thừa Thiên Huế	Đài truyền thanh huyện Nam Đông	93.5	Nam Đông	
Thừa Thiên Huế	Đài truyền thanh huyện Quảng Điền	94.3	Quảng Điền	
Thừa Thiên Huế	Đài truyền thanh huyện A Lưới	96	A Lưới	
Thừa Thiên Huế	Trạm phát sóng FM A Lưới	90	VOV4	
Thừa Thiên Huế	Trạm phát sóng FM Núi Bạch Mã	87.4 (cũ); 95	VOV1	
Thừa Thiên Huế	Đài truyền thanh TX Hương Trà	91.5	TX Hương Trà	
Thừa Thiên Huế	Đài PTTH Thừa Thiên Huế	106.1	Thừa Thiên Huế	

== South Central ==
Province	Transmitter stations	FM Frequency (mhz)	Channels name	Reference
Đà Nẵng	Núi Sơn Trà	96.3 -> 98.5	Đà Nẵng + VOH 99.9	
Đà Nẵng	Trạm phát sóng núi Sơn Trà	91	VOVGT	cũ
Đà Nẵng	Trạm phát sóng Núi Sơn Trà	91	VOV5	
Đà Nẵng	Đài Truyền thanh quận Cẩm Lệ	92.7	Cẩm Lệ	
Đà Nẵng	Đài Truyền thanh Quận Sơn Trà	94.5	Sơn Trà	
Đà Nẵng	Đài truyền thanh quận Ngũ Hành Sơn	93.2	Ngũ Hành Sơn	
Đà Nẵng	Đài truyền thanh quận Ngũ Hành Sơn	93.4	Ngũ Hành Sơn (chương trình ATGT)	
Đà Nẵng	Trạm phát sóng núi Sơn Trà	96.5	VOV2	
Đà Nẵng	Trạm phát sóng núi Sơn Trà	104	VOV Tiếng Anh 24/7	
Đà Nẵng	Trạm phát sóng núi Sơn Trà	89	VOV FM89	
Đà Nẵng	Trạm phát sóng núi Sơn Trà	102.7	VOV3	
Đà Nẵng	Trạm phát sóng núi Sơn Trà	100	VOV1, VOV4, VOV3(cũ)	
Đà Nẵng	Trạm phát sóng núi Sơn Trà	105.5	VOV5	
Đà Nẵng	Đài truyền thanh huyện Hòa Vang	95.8	Hòa Vang	
Đà Nẵng	Đài Truyền thanh quận Liên Chiểu	90.5	Liên Chiểu	
Đà Nẵng	Trạm phát sóng núi Bà Nà	102.5	VOV1	
Quảng Nam	Đài truyền thanh huyện Bắc Trà My	103	Bắc Trà My	
Quảng Nam	Đài truyền thanh huyện Tây Giang	92.9	Tây Giang	
Quảng Nam	Đài truyền thanh huyện Đông Giang	96	Đông Giang	
Quảng Nam	Đài truyền thanh huyện Nam Giang	88.9	Nam Giang	
Quảng Nam	Đài truyền thanh huyện Đông Giang	98.9	Đông Giang	
Quảng Nam	Đài PTTH Quảng Nam - đồi Tam Kỳ, phường An Phú - TP.Tam Kỳ	97.6	Quảng Nam	
Quảng Nam	Đài truyền thanh huyện Phú Ninh	89.6	Phú Ninh	
Quảng Nam	Đài truyền thanh huyện Nông Sơn	95	Nông Sơn	
Quảng Nam	Đài truyền thanh huyện Điện Bàn	100.7	Điện Bàn	
Quảng Nam	Đài truyền thanh TP Hội An	91.2	TP. Hội An	
Quảng Nam	Đài truyền thanh huyện Phước Sơn	89.8	Phước Sơn	
Quảng Nam	Đài truyền thanh huyện Nam Trà My	94.7	Nam Trà My	
Quảng Nam	Trạm phát sóng FM Đỉnh Quế - Tây Giang	100 ⏩ 97	VOV1, VOV4	
Quảng Nam	Đài truyền thanh huyện Thăng Bình	94.6	Thăng Bình	
Quảng Nam	Đài truyền thanh huyện Núi Thành	104.5	Núi Thành	
Quảng Nam	Đài truyền thanh huyện Tiên Phước	91.4	Tiên Phước	
Quảng Nam	Đài truyền thanh huyện Hiệp Đức	92.2	Hiệp Đức	
Quảng Nam	Đài truyền thanh huyện Quế Sơn	98.3	Quế Sơn	
Quảng Nam	Đài truyền thanh TP Tam Kỳ	101.7	TP. Tam Kỳ	
Quảng Nam	Đài truyền thanh huyện Duy Xuyên	95.2	Duy Xuyên	
Quảng Nam	Trạm phát sóng FM Đông Giang	95	VOV1	
Quảng Nam	Đài truyền thanh huyện Đại Lộc	92.9	Đại Lộc	
Quảng Nam	Trạm phát sóng FM Cù Lao Chàm	94	VOV1	
Quảng Ngãi	Đài truyền thanh huyện Lý Sơn	95	VOV1	
Quảng Ngãi	Đài truyền thanh huyện Lý Sơn	91.2	Lý Sơn	
Quảng Ngãi	Đài PTTH Quảng Ngãi	95.5 ⏩ 94	VOV1	
Quảng Ngãi	Đài PTTH Quảng Ngãi	92.5 ⏩ 99.5	VOV2	
Quảng Ngãi	Đài PTTH Quảng Ngãi	93.5 ⏩101	VOV3	
Quảng Ngãi	Đài PTTH Quảng Ngãi	91.5	VOV Giao thông (cũ)	
Quảng Ngãi	Đài truyền thanh huyện Tư Nghĩa	104	Tư Nghĩa	
Quảng Ngãi	Đài truyền thanh huyện Đức Phổ	97.4	Đức Phổ	
Quảng Ngãi	Đài PTTH Quảng Ngãi	102.9/102.7; 95.5	Quảng Ngãi	
Quảng Ngãi	Đài truyền thanh huyện Tây Trà	90.5	Tây Trà	
Quảng Ngãi	Đài truyền thanh huyện Ba Tơ	104.5	Ba Tơ	
Quảng Ngãi	Đài truyền thanh huyện Bình Sơn	103.3	Bình Sơn	
Quảng Ngãi	Đài truyền thanh huyện Sơn Tây	88.6	Sơn Tây	
Quảng Ngãi	Đài truyền thanh huyện Nghĩa Hành	103.7	Nghĩa Hành	
Quảng Ngãi	Đài truyền thanh huyện Trà Bồng	94.6	Trà Bồng	
Quảng Ngãi	Đài truyền thanh huyện Sơn Hà	87.9	Sơn Hà	
Quảng Ngãi	Đài truyền thanh huyện Minh Long	96	Minh Long	
Quảng Ngãi	Đài PTTH Quảng Ngãi	102.9	VOV3	
Quảng Ngãi	Đài truyền thanh huyện Mộ Đức	91	Mộ Đức	
Quảng Ngãi	Đài truyền thanh TP Quảng Ngãi	95	TP Quảng Ngãi	
Đài truyền thanh huyện Sơn Tịnh	96.8	Sơn Tịnh		
Bình Định	Núi Vũng Chua	103.5 ⏩100.5 ⏩ 95	VOV1	
Bình Định	Núi Vũng Chua	103.4 ⏩ 103.5	VOV2	
Bình Định	Núi Vũng Chua	101.4 ⏩ 101.5	VOV3	
Bình Định	Núi Vũng Chua	91	VOV Giao thông	cũ
Bình Định	Đài truyền thanh huyện Phù Cát	92.7	Phù Cát	
Bình Định	Đài truyền thanh huyện Phù Mỹ	93.1	Phù Mỹ	
Bình Định	Đài PTTH Bình Định	100.9	VOV1/Bình Định	
Bình Định	Núi Vũng Chua	97	Bình Định	
Bình Định	Đài truyền thanh huyện Hoài Nhơn	99.9	Bình Định (Hoài Nhơn)	
Bình Định	Đài truyền thanh huyện An Lão	95.1	An Lão	
Bình Định	Đài truyền thanh TP Quy Nhơn	92.2	TP Quy Nhơn	
Bình Định	Đài truyền thanh huyện Hoài Nhơn	105	Hoài Nhơn	
Bình Định	Đài truyền thanh huyện Vân Canh	96.4	Vân Canh	
Bình Định	Đài truyền thanh TX An Nhơn	94.5	TX An Nhơn	
Bình Định	Đài truyền thanh huyện Vĩnh Thạnh	91.7	Vĩnh Thạnh	
Bình Định	Đài phát thanh huyện Tây Sơn	105	Tây Sơn	
Bình Định	Đài truyền thanh huyện Hoài Ân	90.4	Hoài Ân	
Bình Định	Đài truyền thanh huyện Tuy Phước	90.5	Tuy Phước	
Phú Yên	94 ⏩ 100	Trạm phát sóng FM núi Chóp Chài	VOV1	
Phú Yên	Trạm phát sóng FM núi Chóp Chài	88 ⏩ 96.5	VOV2	cũ
Phú Yên	Trạm phát sóng FM núi Chóp Chài	102.7	VOV3, VOV4	
Phú Yên	Trạm phát sóng FM núi Chóp Chài	90 ⏩ 90.5	VOV4	
Phú Yên	Trạm phát sóng FM núi Chóp Chài	91.5	VOV Giao thông (cũ)	
Phú Yên	Trạm phát sóng FM Hầm đường bộ Đèo Cả	102.7	VOV3, VOV4	
Phú Yên	Đài truyền thanh TX Đông Hòa	99	TX Đông Hòa	
Phú Yên	Đài truyền thanh huyện Sông Hinh	98	Sông Hinh	
Phú Yên	Đài truyền thanh huyện Tuy An	101.4	Tuy An	
Phú Yên	Đài truyền thanh huyện Tây Hòa	100.5	Tây Hòa	
Phú Yên	Đài truyền thanh huyện Đồng Xuân	97.3	Đồng Xuân	
Phú Yên	Đài truyền thanh huyện Phú Hòa	88.7	Phú Hòa	
Phú Yên	Đài truyền thanh huyện Sơn Hòa	94	Sơn Hòa	
Phú Yên	Đài truyền thanh TX Sông Cầu	99	TX Sông Cầu	
Phú Yên	Đài truyền thanh TP Tuy Hòa	91	TP. Tuy Hòa	
Phú Yên	Đài PTTH Phú Yên - Trạm phát sóng FM Núi Chóp Chài	96	Phú Yên	
Khánh Hòa	Đài phát sóng Đồng Đế	97.8 ⏩ 95	VOV1	
Khánh Hòa	Đài phát sóng Đồng Đế	104 ⏩ 96.5	VOV2	
Khánh Hòa	Đài phát sóng Đồng Đế	101	VOV3	
Khánh Hòa	Trạm phát sóng núi Hòn Bà	101	VOV4	Núi Hòn Bà
Khánh Hòa	Đài phát sóng Đồng Đế	104	VOV TA 24/7	
Khánh Hòa	Đài phát sóng Đồng Đế	91	VOVGT	
Khánh Hòa	Trạm phát sóng đảo Trường Sa Lớn	100	VOV1	
Khánh Hòa	Trạm phát sóng Hầm đường bộ Đèo Cả	102.7	VOV3, VOV4	
Khánh Hòa	Đài PTTH Khánh Hòa - Trung tâm truyền dẫn phát sóng	101.7 -> 106.5	Khánh Hòa	
Khánh Hòa	Đài PTTH Khánh Hòa	103.3	VOV1	Đài Khánh Hòa phát sóng
Khánh Hòa	Đài Truyền thanh huyện Khánh Sơn	94.2	Khánh Hòa	Phát tại huyện Khánh Sơn
Khánh Hòa	Trạm phát sóng xã Ninh Sơn	94.9	Khánh Hòa	Ninh Sơn, Ninh Hòa
Khánh Hòa	Đài truyền thanh huyện Khánh Vĩnh	98.5	Khánh Vĩnh	
Khánh Hòa	Đài truyền thanh huyện Cam Lâm	91	Cam Lâm	
Khánh Hòa	Đài truyền thanh huyện Khánh Sơn	96.5	Khánh Sơn	
Khánh Hòa	Đài truyền thanh huyện Vạn Ninh	96.4	Vạn Ninh	
Khánh Hòa	Đài Truyền thanh TP. Cam Ranh	101	TP. Cam Ranh	
Khánh Hòa	Trạm phát sóng Núi Hòn Bà	101	VOV4	Núi Hòn Bà (cũ)
Khánh Hòa	Đài truyền thanh TX Ninh Hòa	106.8	TX Ninh Hòa	
Khánh Hòa	Đài truyền thanh huyện Diên Khánh	96.7	Diên Khánh	
Khánh Hòa	Đài truyền thanh TP. Nha Trang	105.5	TP. Nha Trang	
Ninh Thuận	Đài PTTH Ninh Thuận	88.5 ⏩ 100	VOV1	
Ninh Thuận	Đài PTTH Ninh Thuận	93 ⏩ 96.5	VOV2	
Ninh Thuận	Đài PTTH Ninh Thuận	102.7	VOV3	
Ninh Thuận	Đài PTTH Ninh Thuận	89.5 ⏩ 90.5	VOV2, VOV4	
Ninh Thuận	Đài PTTH Ninh Thuận	91.5	VOV Giao thông	cũ
Ninh Thuận	Đài PTTH Ninh Thuận	99.6 ⏩ 95	Ninh Thuận	
Ninh Thuận	Đài truyền thanh TP Phan Rang - Tháp Chàm	88	TP Phan Rang - Tháp Chàm	
Ninh Thuận	Đài PTTH Ninh Thuận	89.5	VOV4	cũ
Ninh Thuận	Đài truyền thanh huyện Thuận Nam	93.6	Thuận Nam	
Ninh Thuận	Đài truyền thanh huyện Ninh Sơn	92.2	Ninh Sơn	
Ninh Thuận	Đài truyền thanh huyện Ninh Hải	89	Ninh Hải	
Ninh Thuận	Đài truyền thanh huyện Ninh Phước	92	Ninh Phước	
Ninh Thuận	Đài truyền thanh huyện Bác Ái	93	Bác Ái	
Ninh Thuận	Đài truyền thanh huyện Thuận Bắc	106	Thuận Bắc	
Bình Thuận	Đài PTTH Bình Thuận	94.5 ⏩ 94	VOV1; VOV1, VOV3, VOV4	
Bình Thuận	Đài PTTH Bình Thuận	90.5 ⏩ 103.5	VOV2	
Bình Thuận	Đài PTTH Bình Thuận	102 ⏩ 101.5	VOV3	
Bình Thuận	Đài PTTH Bình Thuận	103 ⏩ 97	VOV4	
Bình Thuận	Đài PTTH Bình Thuận	91.5	VOV Giao thông	
Bình Thuận	Đài PTTH Bình Thuận	96.5	VOV4	TP. Phan Thiết
Bình Thuận	Đài truyền thanh huyện Phú Quý	95	VOV1	Phú Quý
Bình Thuận	Đài truyền thanh huyện Hàm Tân	99.2	Hàm Tân	
Bình Thuận	Đài truyền thanh huyện Hàm Thuận Bắc	99	Hàm Thuận Bắc	
Bình Thuận	Đài truyền thanh TP Phan Thiết	95.8	TP Phan Thiết	
Bình Thuận	Đài PTTH Bình Thuận	92.3	Bình Thuận	
Bình Thuận	Đài truyền thanh huyện Tuy Phong	97.5	Tuy Phong	
Bình Thuận	Đài truyền thanh TX La Gi	107	La Gi	
Bình Thuận	Đài truyền thanh huyện Hàm Thuận Nam	102.5	Hàm Thuận Nam	
Bình Thuận	Đài truyền thanh huyện Bắc Bình	95.3	Bắc Bình	
Bình Thuận	Đài truyền thanh huyện Tánh Linh	96.5	Tánh Linh	
Bình Thuận	Đài truyền thanh huyện Đức Linh	105.5	Đức Linh	

== Highlands Central ==
Province	Transmitter stations	FM Frequency (mhz)	Channels name	Reference
Kon Tum	Đài PTTH Kon Tum	103.5	VOV2	
Kon Tum	Đài PTTH Kon Tum	101.5	VOV3	
Kon Tum	Đài truyền thanh TP Kon Tum	97.5	TP. Kon Tum	
Kon Tum	Đài PTTH Kon Tum	95.1	Kon Tum	
Kon Tum	Đài truyền thanh huyện Kon Plông	99	Kon Plông	
Kon Tum	Đài truyền thanh huyện Đắk Glei	96.5	Đắk Glei	
Kon Tum	Đài truyền thanh huyện Kon Rẫy	88.8	Kon Rẫy	
Kon Tum	Đài truyền thanh huyện Ngọc Hồi	92	Ngọc Hồi	
Kon Tum	Đài phát sóng FM Ngọc Hồi	94	VOV1-VOV4	Ngọc Hồi
Kon Tum	Đài truyền thanh huyện Sa Thầy	96.2	Sa Thầy	
Kon Tum	Đài PTTH Kon Tum	90.5	VOV2, VOV4	
Kon Tum	Đài PTTH Kon Tum	91.5 (cũ); 100	VOV1	
Kon Tum	Đài truyền thanh huyện Tư Mơ Rông	100	Tư Mơ Rông	
Kon Tum	Đài truyền thanh huyện Tư Mơ Rông	102.2	Tư Mơ Rông	
Kon Tum	Đài truyền thanh huyện Đắk Tô	99.7	Đắk Tô	
Kon Tum	Đài truyền thanh huyện Ia H'Drai	98.4	Ia H'Drai	
Kon Tum	Đài truyền thanh huyện Đắk Hà	93.2	Đắk Hà	
Kon Tum	Đài PTTH Kon Tum	89.5	VOV3	cũ
Kon Tum	Đài PTTH Kon Tum	88.5	VOV4	cũ
Kon Tum	Trạm phát sóng FM Đắk Glei	101.5 (cũ)	VOV1-VOV4 (Đắk Glei)	
Kon Tum	Đài PTTH Kon Tum	91.5	VOV2	cũ
Gia Lai	Đài PTTH Gia Lai - Núi Hàm Rồng	90.5	VOV4	
Gia Lai	Đài truyền thanh TP Pleyku	96.1	Pleyku	
Gia Lai	Đài truyền thanh huyện Kbang	90	Kbang	
Gia Lai	Đài truyền thanh huyện Phú Thiện	91.7	Phú Thiện	
Gia Lai	Đài PTTH Gia Lai - Núi Hàm Rồng	93.7	VOV1/Gia Lai	
Gia Lai	Đài PTTH Gia Lai - Núi Hàm Rồng	102	Gia Lai	
Gia Lai	Đài truyền thanh huyện Đắk Pơ	91.5	Đắk Pơ	
Gia Lai	Đài truyền thanh huyện Chư Pưh	106.3	Chư Pưh	
Gia Lai	Đài truyền thanh huyện Chư Prông	95	Chư Prông	
Gia Lai	Đài truyền thanh huyện Kông Chro	90.2	Kông Chro	
Gia Lai	Đài truyền thanh huyện Krong Pa	95.7	Krong Pa	
Gia Lai	Đài truyền thanh huyện Krong Pa	90.1	Krong Pa/VOV1	
Gia Lai	Đài truyền thanh TX An Khê	98.5	An Khê	
Gia Lai	Đài truyền thanh huyện Ayun Pa	89.1	Ayun Pa	
Gia Lai	Đài truyền thanh huyện Mang Yang	106	Mang Yang	
Gia Lai	Đài truyền thanh huyện Ia Pa	99	Ia Pa	
Gia Lai	Đài truyền thanh huyện Ia Grai	95	Ia Grai	
Gia Lai	Đài truyền thanh huyện Chư Păh	94.2	Chư Păh	
Gia Lai	Đài truyền thanh huyện Đức Cơ	90.8	Đức Cơ	
Gia Lai	Đài truyền thanh huyện Đắk Đoa	99.5	Đắk Đoa	
Gia Lai	Đài truyền thanh huyện Chư Sê	97	Chư Sê	
Gia Lai	Đài truyền thanh huyện Chư Sê	95.5	VOV1, 4	
Gia Lai	Trạm phát sóng núi Hàm Rồng	96.5 ⏩ 100	VOV1	(cũ)
Gia Lai	Trạm phát sóng núi Hàm Rồng	97.5 ⏩ 96.5	VOV2	
Gia Lai	Trạm phát sóng núi Hàm Rồng	98.5 ⏩ 97.5 ⏩102.7	VOV3	cũ
Đắk Lắk	Đài truyền thanh huyện Krông Năng	103.5	Krong Năng	
Đắk Lắk	Đài truyền thanh TP Buôn Ma Thuột	91.3	Buôn Mê Thuột	
Đắk Lắk	Đài truyền thanh huyện Lắk	93	Lắk	
Đắk Lắk	Đài truyền thanh huyện Ea Kar	104	Eakar	
Đắk Lắk	Đài truyền thanh huyện Krong Bong	100.7	Krong Bong	
Đắk Lắk	Đài truyền thanh huyện Krong Bong	91	Krong Bong/VOV1	
Đắk Lắk	Đài truyền thanh huyện Krong Pac	98.1	Krông Pắc	
Đắk Lắk	Đài truyền thanh huyện M'Đrăk	99.2	M'Drak	
Đắk Lắk	Đài truyền thanh huyện Ea Súp	93.4	Ea Súp	
Đắk Lắk	Đài truyền thanh huyện Krong Ana	99.1	Krong Ana	
Đắk Lắk	Đài truyền thanh huyện Ea H'Leo	98.3	Ea H'leo	
Đắk Lắk	Trạm phát sóng Đèo Hà Lan	92.4	VOV1	
Đắk Lắk	Đài truyền thanh huyện Cư M'gar	98.5	Cư M'gar	
Đắk Lắk	Đài PTTH Đắk Lắk	94.7	Đắk Lắk	
Đắk Lắk	Trạm phát sóng Đèo Hà Lan	90	VOV1, VOV3	
Đắk Lắk	Trạm phát sóng đèo Hà Lan	92.7 (cũ); 102.7	VOV2, VOV4	
Đắk Lắk	Đài truyền thanh huyện Buôn Đôn	96	Buôn Đôn	
Đắk Lắk	Đài truyền thanh huyện Buôn Hồ	93.2	Buôn Hồ	
Đắk Lắk	Trạm phát sóng đèo Hà Lan	94 ⏩ 104.5	VOV1	
Đắk Lắk	Trạm phát sóng đèo Hà Lan	91	VOV Giao thông	
Đắk Lắk	Trạm phát sóng đèo Hà Lan	102.7 ⏩ 100	VOV3	
Đắk Lắk	Trạm phát sóng Đèo Hà Lan	102.7 ⏩ 88	VOV4	
Đắk Nông	Trạm phát sóng FM Đài PTTH Đắk Nông	101 (cũ)	VOV3	
Đắk Nông	Đài PTTH Đắk Nông	90.5	VOV4	
Đắk Nông	Đài PTTH Đắk Nông	99.5	VOV2	
Đắk Nông	Đài truyền thanh huyện Tuy Đức	99	Tuy Đức	
Đắk Nông	Đài truyền thanh huyện Đắk R'Lấp	92.2	Đắk R'lấp	
Đắk Nông	Đài truyền thanh huyện Krong Nô	94	Krong Nô	
Đắk Nông	Đài truyền thanh huyện Đắk Glong	103.5	Đắk Glong	
Đắk Nông	Đài truyền thanh huyện Cư Jút	97.5	Cư Jút	
Đắk Nông	Đài truyền thanh huyện Đắk Song	97.5	Đắk Song	
Đắk Nông	Đài PTTH Đắk Nông	101.5	VOV1/VOV4 (cũ)	
Đắk Nông	Đài PTTH Đắk Nông	88.6	VOV3	
Đắk Nông	Đài PTTH Đắk Nông	98.2 ⏩ 88.8 ⏩ 96.6	Đắk Nông	
Đắk Nông	Đài truyền thanh huyện Đắk Mil	95.5	Đắk Nông (Đắk Mil)	
Đắk Nông	Đài truyền thanh TP Gia Nghĩa	106	TP Gia Nghĩa	
Đắk Nông	Đài PTTH Đắk Nông	99.5	VOV2, VOV4	
Đắk Nông	Đài PTTH Đắk Nông	95	VOV1	
Đắk Nông	Đài truyền thanh huyện Đắk Mil	99.5	VOV1 (Đắk Mill cũ)	
Lâm Đồng	Đài Phát thanh huyện Cát Tiên	105.5	Cát Tiên	
Lâm Đồng	Đài Phát thanh huyện Di Linh	94.5	Di Linh	
Lâm Đồng	Đài Phát thanh huyện Đam Rông	93.3	Đam Rông	Tiếp sóng VOV3
Lâm Đồng	Đài Phát thanh huyện Đam Rông	92	Lâm Đồng (Đam Rông)	
Lâm Đồng	Đài truyền thanh TP. Đà Lạt	102 ⏩ 107.5	Đà Lạt	
Lâm Đồng	Đài truyền thanh huyện Bảo Lâm	102	Bảo Lâm	
Lâm Đồng	Đài Phát thanh huyện Đạ Huoai	96.2	Đạ Huoai	
Lâm Đồng	Đài Phát thanh Truyền hình Lâm Đồng	97	Lâm Đồng	
Lâm Đồng	Đài truyền thanh huyện Đạ Tẻh	98	Đạ Tẻh	
Lâm Đồng	Đài truyền thanh huyện Lạc Dương	93	Lạc Dương	
Lâm Đồng	Đài truyền thanh huyện Đơn Dương	94	Đơn Dương	
Lâm Đồng	Đài truyền thanh huyện Đức Trọng	92	Đức Trọng	
Lâm Đồng	Đài truyền thanh huyện Bảo Lộc	98.6	Bảo Lộc	
Lâm Đồng	Trạm phát sóng FM Cầu Đất	100	VOV1, VOV4	
Lâm Đồng	Trạm phát sóng FM Cầu Đất	97	Lâm Đồng (Xã Trạm Hành, TP Đà Lạt)	
Lâm Đồng	Trạm phát sóng FM Cầu Đất	101.5	VOV3	
Lâm Đồng	Trạm phát sóng FM Cầu Đất	103.5	VOV1 (cũ)	
Lâm Đồng	Trạm phát sóng FM Cầu Đất	88 ⏩ 93.5	VOV4	
Lâm Đồng	Đài Phát thanh huyện Đạ Tẻh	93	Đạ Tẻh + Lâm Đồng	
Lâm Đồng	Đài truyền thanh huyện Bảo Lâm	98	Bảo Lâm + Lâm Đồng	

== Southeast ==
Province	Transmitter stations	FM Frequency (MHz)	Channel’s name	Reference
Bình Phước	Trạm phát sóng núi Bà Rá	87.7	VOH	
Bình Phước	Đài truyền thanh huyện Bù Gia Mập	102.5	Bù Gia Mập	
Bình Phước	Đài truyền thanh TP Đồng Xoài	98.6	TP Đồng Xoài	
Bình Phước	Đài truyền thanh huyện Bù Đốp	95.1	Bù Đốp	
Bình Phước	Đài truyền thanh Bù Đăng	102	Bù Đăng	
Bình Phước	Đài truyền thanh TX Bình Long	98.1	TX Bình Long	
Bình Phước	Đài truyền thanh huyện Phước Long	94.6	Phước Long	
Bình Phước	Đài truyền thanh huyện Hớn Quản	91.8	Hớn Quản	
Bình Phước	Đài truyền thanh huyện Đồng Phú	97.1	Đồng Phú	
Bình Phước	Đài truyền thanh huyện Chơn Thành	95.5	Chơn Thành	
Bình Phước	Đài truyền thanh huyện Phú Riềng	100.6	Phú Riềng	
Bình Phước	Đài truyền thanh huyện Lộc Ninh	94.4	Lộc Ninh	
Bình Phước	Đài PTTH Bình Phước - Núi Bà Rá	89.4	Bình Phước	
Tây Ninh	Trạm phát sóng núi Bà Đen cũ	99	VOV Giao thông	
Tây Ninh	Đài truyền thanh huyện Dương Minh Châu	99.4	Dương Minh Châu	
Tây Ninh	Đài truyền thanh huyện Châu Thành	89.6	Châu Thành	
Tây Ninh	Đài truyền thanh huyện Tân Châu	106.1	Tân Châu	
Tây Ninh	Đài truyền thanh huyện Tân Biên	91.3	Tân Biên	
Tây Ninh	Đài PTTH Tây Ninh	103.1	Tây Ninh	
Tây Ninh	Đài truyền thanh huyện Hòa Thành	96.7	Hòa Thành	
Tây Ninh	Đài truyền thanh huyện Bến Cầu	96.3	Bến Cầu	
Tây Ninh	Đài truyền thanh huyện Trảng Bàng	94.9	Trảng Bàng	
Tây Ninh	Đài truyền thanh TP Tây Ninh	95.1	TP Tây Ninh	
Tây Ninh	Đài truyền thanh huyện Gò Dầu	100.4	Gò Dầu	
Tây Ninh	Trạm phát sóng Núi Bà Đen	101	VOV3	
Tây Ninh	Trạm phát sóng núi Bà Đen	101	VOV1/Núi Bà Đen	
Bình Dương	Đài truyền thanh TX Tân Uyên	98.2	Tân Uyên	
Bình Dương	Đài truyền thanh TP Dĩ An	89.9	Dĩ An	
Bình Dương	Đài truyền thanh TX Bến Cát	94.6	Bến Cát	
Bình Dương	Đài truyền thanh TP Thuận An	107	Thuận An	
Bình Dương	Đài truyền thanh huyện Bàu Bàng	106.8	Bàu Bàng	
Bình Dương	Đài truyền thanh TP Thủ Dầu Một	90.4	Thủ Dầu Một	
Bình Dương	Đài PTTH Bình Dương	92.5	Bình Dương	
Bình Dương	Đài PTTH Bình Dương	101.7	JOYFM -> ON 365FM	
Bình Dương	Đài truyền thanh huyện Phú Giáo	99.5	Phú Giáo	
Bình Dương	Đài truyền thanh huyện Bắc Tân Uyên	88.2	Bắc Tân Uyên	
Đồng Nai	Đài truyền thanh huyện Định Quán	93.4	Định Quán	
Đồng Nai	Đài truyền thanh huyện Tân Phú	90.6	Tân Phú	
Đồng Nai	Đài truyền thanh huyện Xuân Lộc	94.6	Xuân Lộc	
Đồng Nai	Đài truyền thanh huyện Nhơn Trạch	88.4	Nhơn Trạch	
Đồng Nai	Đài truyền thanh huyện Cẩm Mỹ	93.3	Cẩm Mỹ	
Đồng Nai	Đài truyền thanh huyện Vĩnh Cửu	94.5	Vĩnh Cửu	
Đồng Nai	Đài truyền thanh huyện Trảng Bom	103.8	Trảng Bom	
Đồng Nai	Đài truyền thanh TP Biên Hòa	106	Biên Hòa	
Đồng Nai	Đài truyền thanh huyện Long Thành	107.3	Long Thành	
Đồng Nai	Đài truyền thanh TP Long Khánh	95.3	Long Khánh	
Đồng Nai	Đài PTTH Đồng Nai	97.5	Đồng Nai	
Đồng Nai	Đài truyền thanh huyện Thống Nhất	88.6	Thống Nhất	
Đồng Nai	Đài PTTH Đồng Nai	95	VOV5	
Bà Rịa - Vũng Tàu	Đài truyền thanh huyện Châu Đức	90.7	Châu Đức	
Bà Rịa - Vũng Tàu	Đài truyền thanh huyện Long Điền	90	Long Điền	
Bà Rịa - Vũng Tàu	Đài truyền thanh huyện Tân Thành (cũ)	105	Tân Thành (Phú Mỹ hiện tại)	
Bà Rịa - Vũng Tàu	Đài truyền thanh TP Bà Rịa	88	Bà Rịa	
Bà Rịa - Vũng Tàu	Đài truyền thanh huyện Xuyên Mộc	87.5	Xuyên Mộc	
Bà Rịa - Vũng Tàu	Núi Nhỏ (cũ) -> Đài PTTH Bà Rịa Vũng Tàu	102.5 ⏩ 92	Bà Rịa - Vũng Tàu	
Bà Rịa - Vũng Tàu	Trạm phát sóng Bến Dầm	88.3	Bà Rịa - Vũng Tàu (Bến Đầm, Côn Đảo)	
Bà Rịa - Vũng Tàu	Trạm phát sóng Cỏ Ống	95	Bà Rịa - Vũng Tàu (Cỏ Ống, Côn Đảo)	
Bà Rịa - Vũng Tàu	Trạm phát sóng Núi Thánh Giá	96	Bà Rịa - Vũng Tàu + VOH (Côn Đảo)	
Bà Rịa - Vũng Tàu	Đài truyền thanh huyện Châu Đức	100.6	Bà Rịa - Vũng Tàu (Châu Đức)	
Bà Rịa - Vũng Tàu	Đài truyền thanh huyện Đất Đỏ	88.5	Đất Đỏ	
Bà Rịa - Vũng Tàu	Trạm phát sóng FM Núi Lớn	102	VOV3	
Bà Rịa - Vũng Tàu	Trạm phát sóng FM Núi Lớn	102	VOV5	
Bà Rịa - Vũng Tàu	Đài truyền thanh TX Phú Mỹ (Tân Thành)	102.2	Bà Rịa - Vũng Tàu (Tân Thành - TX Phú Mỹ)	
Bà Rịa - Vũng Tàu	Đài truyền thanh huyện Côn Đảo	101	VOV1 (Côn Đảo)	
TP. Hồ Chí Minh	Đài truyền thanh huyện Củ Chi	106.5	Củ Chi	
TP. Hồ Chí Minh	Đài truyền thanh huyện Hóc Môn	93	Hóc Môn	
TP. Hồ Chí Minh	Trạm phát sóng FM phường Tân Phú, TP. Thủ Đức; Đài Truyền hình TP.HCM	99.9	VOH 99.9	
TP. Hồ Chí Minh	Trạm phát sóng FM phường Tân Phú, TP. Thủ Đức	95.6	VOH 95.6	
TP. Hồ Chí Minh	Đài truyền thanh huyện Bình Chánh	103.4	Bình Chánh	
TP. Hồ Chí Minh	Đài truyền thanh huyện Cần Giờ	105	Cần Giờ	
TP. Hồ Chí Minh	Đài truyền thanh huyện Nhà Bè	98.3	Nhà Bè	
TP. Hồ Chí Minh	Trạm phát sóng Quán Tre	91	VOV Giao thông TPHCM	
TP. Hồ Chí Minh	Trạm phát sóng Quán Tre	104	VOV 24/7	
TP. Hồ Chí Minh	Trạm phát sóng Quán Tre	94	VOV1	
TP. Hồ Chí Minh	Trạm phát sóng Quán Tre	104.5 (cũ); 102.7	VOV3	
TP. Hồ Chí Minh	Trạm phát sóng Quán Tre	89	VOV3	
TP. Hồ Chí Minh	Trạm phát sóng FM phường Tân Phú, TP. Thủ Đức	87.7	VOH 87.7	
TP. Hồ Chí Minh	Đài phát sóng Quán Tre	91 ⏩ 105.7	VOV5	
TP. Hồ Chí Minh	Đài phát sóng Quán Tre	89	VOV FM 89	
TP. Hồ Chí Minh	Đài phát sóng Quán Tre	96.5	VOV2	
TP. Hồ Chí Minh	Đài Truyền hình TPHCM	103	VOH (cũ)	
TP. Hồ Chí Minh	Đài phát sóng Quán Tre	104.5	VOV2 (cũ)	

== Southwest ==
Province	Transmitter stations	FM Frequency (mhz)	Channels name	Reference
Long An	Đài truyền thanh huyện Tân Hưng	89.2	Tân Hưng	
Long An	Đài truyền thanh huyện Tân Trụ	89.4	Tân Trụ	
Long An	Đài truyền thanh huyện Đức Huệ	91.7	Đức Huệ	
Long An	Đài truyền thanh huyện Vĩnh Hưng	92.9	Vĩnh Hưng	
Long An	Đài truyền thanh huyện Cần Giuộc	93.2	Cần Giuộc	
Long An	Đài truyền thanh TX Kiến Tường	94.4	TX Kiến Tường	
Long An	Đài PTTH Long An	96.9	Long An	
Long An	Đài truyền thanh huyện Cần Đước	98.9	Cần Đước	
Long An	Đài truyền thanh huyện Tân Thạnh	99.3	Tân Thạnh	
Long An	Đài truyền thanh huyện Bến Lức	100.5	Bến Lức	
Long An	Đài truyền thanh huyện Đức Hòa	105.2	Đức Hòa	
Long An	Đài truyền thanh huyện Châu Thành	106.2	Châu Thành	
Long An	Đài truyền thanh huyện Thủ Thừa	107.2	Thủ Thừa	
Long An	Đài truyền thanh TP Tân An	103.7	TP Tân An	
Long An	Đài truyền thanh huyện Mộc Hóa	104.9	Mộc Hóa	
Long An	Đài truyền thanh huyện Thạnh Hóa	95.4	Thạnh Hóa	
Tiền Giang	Đài truyền thanh huyện Chợ Gạo	88.8	Chợ Gạo	
Tiền Giang	Đài truyền thanh huyện Tân Phước	92.2	Tân Phước	
Tiền Giang	Đài truyền thanh huyện Cái Bè	94.8	Cái Bè	
Tiền Giang	Đài truyền thanh huyện Gò Công Đông	95	Gò Công Đông	
Tiền Giang	Đài PTTH Tiền Giang	102.7 -> 96.2	Tiền Giang	
Tiền Giang	Đài truyền thanh TX Gò Công	98.5	TX Gò Công	
Tiền Giang	Đài truyền thanh TP Mỹ Tho	99.1	TP. Mỹ Tho	
Tiền Giang	Đài truyền thanh huyện Cai Lậy	103.5	Cai Lậy	
Tiền Giang	Đài truyền thanh huyện Gò Công Tây	103.6	Gò Công Tây	
Tiền Giang	Đài truyền thanh huyện Tân Phú Đông	106.7	Tân Phú Đông	
Tiền Giang	Đài truyền thanh huyện Châu Thành	107.5	Châu Thành	
Bến Tre	Đài truyền thanh huyện Chợ Lách	88.5	Chợ Lách	
Bến Tre	Đài truyền thanh huyện Châu Thành	94.5	Châu Thành	
Bến Tre	Đài truyền thanh huyện Giồng Trôm	95.2	Giồng Trôm	
Bến Tre	Đài truyền thanh huyện Mỏ Cày Nam	97.6	Mỏ Cày Nam	
Bến Tre	Đài PTTH Bến Tre	97.9	Bến Tre	
Bến Tre	Đài truyền thanh huyện Ba Tri	98.1	Ba Tri	
Bến Tre	Đài truyền thanh huyện Bình Đại	101.7	Bình Đại	
Bến Tre	Đài truyền thanh TP Bến Tre	107 -> 91.6	TP. Bến Tre	
Bến Tre	Đài truyền thanh huyện Thạnh Phú	96.6	Thạnh Phú	
Bến Tre	Đài truyền thanh huyện Mỏ Cày Bắc	105.3	Mỏ Cày Bắc	
Đồng Tháp	Đài truyền thanh huyện Thanh Bình	89.9	Thanh Bình	
Đồng Tháp	Đài truyền thanh huyện Lấp Vò	92	Lấp Vò	
Đồng Tháp	Đài Phát thanh huyện Tân Hồng	92.4	Tân Hồng	
Đồng Tháp	Đài truyền thanh huyện Lai Vung	95	Lai Vung	
Đồng Tháp	Đài truyền thanh TP Sa Đéc	95.8	Sa Đéc	
Đồng Tháp	Đài truyền thanh huyện Cao Lãnh	96.4	Cao Lãnh	
Đồng Tháp	Đài truyền thanh huyện Tháp Mười	97.6	Tháp Mười	
Đồng Tháp	Đài PTTH Đồng Tháp	98.4	Đồng Tháp	
Đồng Tháp	Đài truyền thanh huyện Tam Nông	100.2	Tam Nông	
Đồng Tháp	Đài truyền thanh TP. Hồng Ngự	101.7	Hồng Ngự	
Đồng Tháp	Đài truyền thanh huyện Cao Lãnh	102.9	Cao Lãnh	
Vĩnh Long	Đài PTTH Vĩnh Long	90.2	Vĩnh Long	
Vĩnh Long	Đài truyền thanh huyện Vũng Liêm	90.7	Vũng Liêm	
Vĩnh Long	Đài truyền thanh huyện Trà Ôn	93.2	Trà Ôn	
Vĩnh Long	Đài truyền thanh TP Vĩnh Long	93.5	TP. Vĩnh Long	
Vĩnh Long	Đài truyền thanh huyện Măng Thít	95.5	Măng Thít	
Vĩnh Long	Đài truyền thanh huyện Bình Minh	96	Bình Minh	
Vĩnh Long	Đài truyền thanh huyện Long Hồ	98.7	Long Hồ	
Vĩnh Long	Đài truyền thanh huyện Tam Bình	99.7	Tam Bình	
Vĩnh Long	Đài truyền thanh huyện Bình Tân	106.4	Bình Tân	
Cần Thơ	Đài phát sóng phát thanh VN2	88	VOV4	
Cần Thơ	Đài phát sóng phát thanh VN2	89	VOV FM89	
Cần Thơ	Đài phát sóng phát thanh VN2	89.2	Vĩnh Thạnh	
Cần Thơ	Đài phát sóng phát thanh VN2	90	VOV Giao thông - Mekong FM	
Cần Thơ	Đài truyền thanh quận Ô Môn	90.8 ⏩ 91	Ô Môn	
Cần Thơ	Đài truyền thanh huyện Cờ Đỏ	88.8 ⏩ 92.5	Cờ Đỏ	
Cần Thơ	Đài phát sóng phát thanh VN2	90 (cũ) 102.5 cũ -> 94	VOV1	
Cần Thơ	Đài truyền thanh quận Thốt Nốt	94 ⏩ 95.3	Thốt Nốt	
Cần Thơ	Đài phát sóng phát thanh VN2	96.5	VOV2	
Cần Thơ	Đài PTTH Cần Thơ	97.3	Cần Thơ	
Cần Thơ	Đài truyền thanh quận Cái Răng	103.8	Cái Răng.	
Cần Thơ	Đài truyền thanh huyện Thới Lai	104.1 (cũ); 102.2	Thới Lai	
Cần Thơ	Đài truyền thanh quận Ninh Kiều	104.7	Ninh Kiều	
Cần Thơ	Đài truyền thanh huyện Phong Điền	105.2	Phong Điền	
Cần Thơ	Đài truyền thanh quận Bình Thủy	105.7	Bình Thủy	
Cần Thơ	Đài phát sóng phát thanh VN2	102.2	VOV3 (cũ)	
Cần Thơ	Đài phát sóng phát thanh VN2	104	VOV Tiếng Anh 24/7	
Hậu Giang	Đài truyền thanh huyện Châu Thành	88.1	Châu Thành	
Hậu Giang	Đài PTTH Hậu Giang	89.6	Hậu Giang	
Hậu Giang	Đài truyền thanh huyện Vị Thủy	91.1	Vị Thủy	
Hậu Giang	Đài truyền thanh TP Vị Thanh	95.4	TP. Vị Thanh	
Hậu Giang	Đài truyền thanh TP Ngã Bảy	95.8	Ngã Bảy	
Hậu Giang	Đài truyền thanh huyện Long Mỹ	94.3	Long Mỹ	
Hậu Giang	Đài truyền thanh huyện Long Mỹ	97.7	Long Mỹ	
Hậu Giang	Đài truyền thanh huyện Châu Thành A	101.7	Châu Thành A	
Hậu Giang	Đài truyền thanh huyện Phụng Hiệp	106.6	Phụng Hiệp	
Trà Vinh	Đài truyền thanh huyện Cầu Ngang	88.7	Cầu Ngang	
Trà Vinh	Đài truyền thanh huyện Trà Cú	90.6	Trà Cú	
Trà Vinh	Đài PTTH Trà Vinh	92.7	Trà Vinh	
Trà Vinh	Đài truyền thanh huyện Càng Long	93.1	Càng Long	
Trà Vinh	Đài truyền thanh huyện Tiểu Cần	93.3	Tiểu Cần	
Trà Vinh	Đài PTTH Trà Vinh	95	VOV1	
Trà Vinh	Đài truyền thanh huyện Duyên Hải	95.9	Duyên Hải	
Trà Vinh	Đài truyền thanh huyện Cầu Kè	101.4	Cầu Kè	
Trà Vinh	Đài truyền thanh TX Duyên Hải	101.5	TX. Duyên Hải	
Trà Vinh	Đài truyền thanh TP Trà Vinh	106	TP. Trà Vinh	
Trà Vinh	Đài PTTH Trà Vinh	88 (cũ)	VOV1	
Trà Vinh	Đài PTTH Trà Vinh	102.5 ⏩ 103	VOV2	cũ
Sóc Trăng	Đài truyền thanh huyện Kế Sách	92.1	Kế Sách	
Sóc Trăng	Đài truyền thanh huyện Thạnh Trị	93.4	Thạnh Trị	
Sóc Trăng	Đài truyền thanh huyện Long Phú	98	Long Phú	
Sóc Trăng	Đài truyền thanh huyện Mỹ Tú	98.6	Mỹ Tú	
Sóc Trăng	Đài truyền thanh huyện Châu Thành	99	Châu Thành	
Sóc Trăng	Đài truyền thanh huyện Ngã Năm	100.1	Ngã Năm	
Sóc Trăng	Đài PTTH Sóc Trăng	100.4	Sóc Trăng	
Sóc Trăng	Đài truyền thanh huyện Cù Lao Dung	100.7	Cù Lao Dung	
Sóc Trăng	Đài truyền thanh TP Sóc Trăng	102	TP. Sóc Trăng	
Sóc Trăng	Đài PTTH Sóc Trăng	103.2	VOH	
Sóc Trăng	Đài truyền thanh huyện Mỹ Xuyên	105.4	Mỹ Xuyên	
Sóc Trăng	Đài truyền thanh huyện Trần Đề	106.9	Trần Đề	
Bạc Liêu	Đài truyền thanh TP Bạc Liêu	88	TP. Bạc Liêu	
Bạc Liêu	Đài truyền thanh huyện Giá Rai	88.9	Giá Rai	
Bạc Liêu	Đài truyền thanh huyện Phước Long	92.4	Phước Long	
Bạc Liêu	Đài PTTH Bạc Liêu	93.8	Bạc Liêu	
Bạc Liêu	Đài truyền thanh huyện Hòa Bình	94.7	Hòa Bình	
Bạc Liêu	Đài truyền thanh huyện Đông Hải	95.4	Đông Hải	
Bạc Liêu	Đài truyền thanh huyện Hồng Dân	96.7	Hồng Dân	
Bạc Liêu	Đài truyền thanh huyện Vĩnh Lợi	98.8	Vĩnh Lợi	
Cà Mau	Đài PTTH Cà Mau	97.8	VOV1	
Cà Mau	Đài PTTH Cà Mau	101.5	VOV3	
Cà Mau	Đài truyền thanh huyện Dầm Dơi	90.8	Dầm Dơi	
Cà Mau	Đài truyền thanh huyện Năm Căn	92.7	Năm Căn	
Cà Mau	Đài truyền thanh huyện U Minh	92.8	U Minh	
Cà Mau	Đài truyền thanh huyện Trần Văn Thời	93.3	Trần Văn Thời	
Cà Mau	Đài PTTH Cà Mau	94.6	Cà Mau	
Cà Mau	Đài truyền thanh huyện Cái Nước	95	Cái Nước	
Cà Mau	Đài truyền thanh huyện Thới Bình	95.5	Thới Bình	
Cà Mau	Đài truyền thanh TP Cà Mau	98.5	TP. Cà Mau	
Cà Mau	Đài truyền thanh huyện Ngọc Hiển	99.2	Ngọc Hiển	
Cà Mau	Đài truyền thanh huyện Phú Tân	99.6	Phú Tân	
Cà Mau	Đài PTTH Cà Mau	95.9	VOV1	
Cà Mau	Đài PTTH Cà Mau	107	VOV1	
Kiên Giang	Đài truyền thanh huyện Kiên Lương	88	Kiên Lương	
Kiên Giang	Đài truyền thanh huyện Châu Thành	89.1	Châu Thành	
Kiên Giang	Đài truyền thanh huyện Giồng Riềng	90.5	Giồng Riềng	
Kiên Giang	Đài truyền thanh TP Hà Tiên	90.6	Hà Tiên	
Kiên Giang	Đài truyền thanh huyện Vĩnh Thuận	91	Vĩnh Thuận	
Kiên Giang	Đài truyền thanh huyện Gò Quao	94.9	Gò Quao	
Kiên Giang	Trạm phát sóng Hòn Me	95	VOV1	
Kiên Giang	Đài truyền thanh huyện Hòn Đất	95.1	Hòn Đất	
Kiên Giang	Đài truyền thanh TP Phú Quốc	95.7	Phú Quốc	
Kiên Giang	Đài truyền thanh huyện An Biên	96	An Biên	
Kiên Giang	Đài PTTH Kiên Giang	99.4	Kiên Giang	
Kiên Giang	Đài truyền thanh huyện An Minh	100.3	An Minh	
Kiên Giang	Đài truyền thanh huyện Gò Quao	88.5; 101	VOV3	Gò Quao
Kiên Giang	Đài truyền thanh huyện Tân Hiệp	101.9	Tân Hiệp	
Kiên Giang	Trạm phát sóng Hòn Me	103.5	VOV2	
Kiên Giang	Đài truyền thanh TP Rạch Giá	104.3	TP Rạch Giá	
Kiên Giang	Trạm phát sóng Hòn Me; Đài truyền thanh huyện Giang Thành	104.5	VOV 24/7; Giang Thành	
Kiên Giang	Đài truyền thanh huyện U Minh Thượng	105.5	U Minh Thượng	
Kiên Giang	Đài truyền thanh TP Phú Quốc	101	VOV1	
Kiên Giang	Đài truyền thanh TP Phú Quốc	103.5	VOV3	Phú Quốc
Kiên Giang	Trạm phát sóng FM Đảo Thổ Chu	102	VOV1	Thổ Chu
An Giang	Trạm phát sóng FM Núi Cấm	96.5	VOV2	
An Giang	Đài truyền thanh huyện Tri Tôn	87.5	Tri Tôn	
An Giang	Đài truyền thanh TP Châu Đốc	92.1	Châu Đốc	
An Giang	Đài PTTH An Giang - Núi Cấm	93.1	An Giang	
An Giang	Đài truyền thanh huyện An Phú	96	An Phú	
An Giang	Đài truyền thanh TP Long Xuyên	97.8	Long Xuyên	
An Giang	Đài truyền thanh huyện Tân Châu	99	Tân Châu	
An Giang	Đài truyền thanh huyện Chợ Mới	101.5	Chợ Mới	
An Giang	Trạm phát sóng FM Núi Cấm	102.7	VOV3, VOV4	
An Giang	Đài truyền thanh huyện Phú Tân	103.4	Phú Tân	
An Giang	Đài truyền thanh huyện Thoại Sơn	104.8	Thoại Sơn	
An Giang	Đài truyền thanh huyện Châu Thành	106.1	Châu Thành	
An Giang	Đài truyền thanh huyện Tịnh Biên	107.1	Tịnh Biên	
An Giang	Đài truyền thanh huyện Châu Phú	107.6	Châu Phú	
An Giang	Trạm phát sóng FM Núi Cấm	91.5 (cũ)	VOV3	

== Basic Radio ==
Grassroots radio, also known as "ward speaker, wireless radio broadcasting", is the radio channel at the commune, ward, and village level, run by the people of the wards, commune in charge, the transmitting station is located at the People's Committee of the ward/commune with a broadcasting power lower than 100W, broadcasting on the frequency channel band FM below 87.5 MHz. With these channels, only a few devices FM can receive and listen to frequencies below 87.5, most of which are loudspeakers of commune, [...] Ward. (Except for some communes/wards with radio frequency higher than 87.5 MHz)

== See also ==
- Voice of Vietnam
- VOH
