= KZOM =

Currently silent
- Claypool, Arizona; United States
- Broadcast area: Globe and parts of the Phoenix metropolitan area and the Tucson metropolitan area
- Frequency: 96.5 MHz (HD Radio)
- Branding: La Z 96.5

Programming
- Format: Regional Mexican
- Affiliations: Westwood One

Ownership
- Owner: Orozco Broadcasting

History
- First air date: 1991 (as KIKO-FM at 106.1)
- Former call signs: KIKO-FM (1991-2024)
- Former frequencies: 106.1 MHz (1991–2010); 97.3 MHz (2010–2017)

Technical information
- Licensing authority: FCC
- Facility ID: 11894
- Class: C
- ERP: 30,000 watts (horizontal)
- HAAT: 966 meters (3,169 ft)
- Transmitter coordinates: 33°17′20″N 110°49′45″W
- Translator: 96.5 K243BN (Laveen)

Links
- Public license information: Public file; LMS
- Website: lazphx.com

KZOM (96.5 MHz) is a commercial radio station licensed to Claypool, Arizona. KZOM is owned by Orozco Broadcasting and programs a Regional Mexican radio format. It has an effective radiated power (ERP) of 30,000 watts, heard in parts of the Phoenix metropolitan area and the Tucson metropolitan area. Its transmitter is located off Route 651 in the Pinal Mountains, at 966 meters (3,169 ft) in height above average terrain (HAAT).

The station was initially assigned the KIKO-FM call letters by the Federal Communications Commission on April 19, 1990.

== History ==
In December 2007, 1TV.Com (John Low, president) reached an agreement to acquire KIKO (1340 AM) and KIKO-FM (then at 106.1 FM) from Shoecraft Broadcasting for a reported $1.025 million. Broadcasting & Cable reported that the deal called for a $50,000 escrow deposit plus $725,000 cash at closing, then an additional $250,000 upon the FCC's issuance of a construction permit allowing 1TV.com to upgrade the facilities of KIKO-FM to Class C3 and moved from 106.1 to 97.3.

The FCC granted this voluntary transfer of license on February 19, 2008. and the transfer was completed April 30, 2008. The station made the move to its new frequency.

On January 27, 2012, 97.3 KIKO-FM changed its format to comedy, branded as "Funny 97.3". The station was taken dark on March 17, 2014.

After being silent for nearly four months, KIKO-FM returned to the air on July 8, 2014, with an oldies format, branded as "Oldies 97.3".

In August 2017, KIKO-FM moved from 97.3 FM to 96.5 FM.

KIKO-FM was approved to change from a class C2 to a class C and increase its power from 670 watts to 34,000 watts, while decreasing height from 1,015 meters to 966 meters (3,169 ft). The upgrade allows KIKO-FM's signal to reach parts of the Phoenix and Tucson radio markets. The station was finally licensed on August 28, 2019, with a minor change to 30,000 watts with horizontal polarization only, which allows them to run with less transmitter power output at the expense of reception, especially in cars.

In July 2024, KIKO-FM was sold to Orozco Broadcasting. At the same time, they acquired translator K243BN (which previously carried programing from KAIZ) as part of a settlement over interference caused by the two stations being on the same frequency, expanding the station's reach into most of the Phoenix area.

On December 13, 2024, KIKO-FM changed its format from oldies to Regional Mexican, branded as "La Z 96.5" under new KZOM call letters.

On October 22, 2026, KZOM ceased operations and went silent.
