= Voice of Vietnam =

National broadcasting service of Vietnam

- Đài Tiếng nói Việt Nam

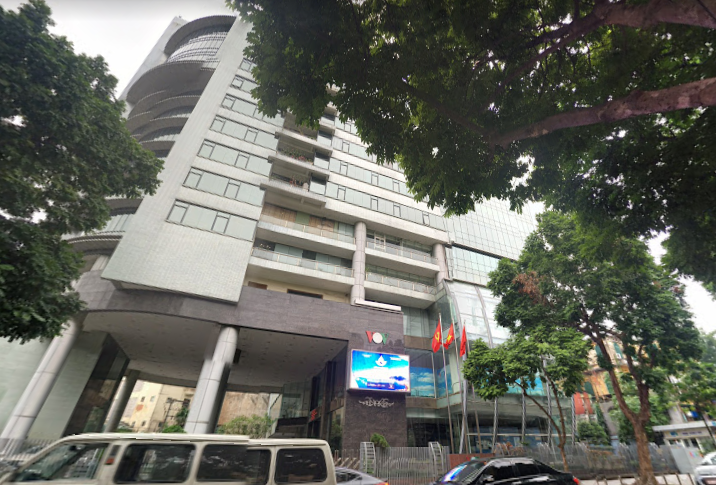
- Abbreviation: VOV, TNVN
- Nickname: Radio the Voice of Vietnam
- Formation: 7 September 1945; 81 years ago
- Headquarters: 58 Quan Su street, Cua Nam ward
- Location: Hanoi
- Origins: North Vietnam
- Region served: Vietnam
- Owner: State Media
- CEO: Đỗ Tiến Sỹ
- Website: vov.gov.vn

The Voice of Vietnam is the Vietnamese national radio broadcaster. Directly state-run alongside the Vietnam Television and the Vietnam News Agency, VOV is tasked with promoting the policies of the Communist Party of Vietnam and the laws of the state.

== History ==
Prior to 1945, the Vietnamese were banned from owning radio receivers, and broadcasting was under the control of the French colonial government, which established the first radio station in Vietnam, Radio Saigon, in the late 1920s.

Vietnam's national radio station, now called the Voice of Vietnam, started broadcasting from Da Lat just a week after the declaration of the Democratic Republic of Vietnam with the declaration "This is the Voice of Vietnam, broadcasting from Hanoi, the capital of the Democratic Republic of Vietnam," followed by the playing of "Destroy Fascists", a patriotic anthem of the August Revolution, which serves till today as the official anthem of the radio network. During the Vietnam War, Radio Hanoi operated as a propaganda tool for North Vietnam. In August 1968, Voice of Vietnam commenced shortwave broadcasts for Vietnamese living abroad.

During the early years, VOV has been criticized from commentators of Europe and America.

From 2017, VOV began operating the VOV Media app on smartphones, and in 2020, VOV launched VOV Live, a digital platform featuring live radio & TV channel with on-demand programs as well.

== Services ==
=== Radio ===
The main radio stations available on analogue and VOV applications area:

- VOV1 – news and current affairs; plus live important national events, parliament meetings, etc. Music, literature and drama are the only fields that largely fall outside its format. Broadcast 19/7, with overnight simulcast of VOV3 from midnight to 04:45. Available on 94-100 FM, 594-711 MW and on multiple frequencies on SW.
- VOV2 – culture, sports, leisure, science and educational. Broadcast 19/7; available on 96.5-103.5 FM, 549-1089 MW and 6.02-9.875 SW.
- VOV3 – music-oriented. Broadcast 24/7, the station was previously home of Xone FM and The One Radio from 2006 to mid-April 2023. Available on 102.7 FM in Hanoi, HCMC and nationwide FM systems.
- VOV4 – ethnic languages, broadcasting in 11 languages. Available in MW, SW and FM under five regional feeds, 12/7. All five feeds are available online and on VOV apps.
- VOV5 – international service. Broadcasting in 13 foreign languages to many parts of the world via analogue and digital shortwave, internet streaming and podcasting, satellite, FM and MW relays. The Vietnamese feed is available on 105.5 FM in Hanoi and 105.7 FM in Ho Chi Minh City and Quang Ninh Province from 07:00 to 23:00
- VOV6 – literature and art programmes, a block on VOV2 with diversal air time.
- VOV Traffic Service – transportation information, entertainment and talk. Divided into three separate channels: VOV Traffic Service - Hanoi, VOV Traffic Service - Ho Chi Minh City, VOV Traffic Service - Central Coast and Mekong FM. The Hanoi, HCMC, Mekong and Central Coast editions both available on 91.0 FM. These channels are all broadcast 24/7.
- VOV Sonata FM89 – symphonic and chamber music. Experimental broadcasting begins on October 20th, 2026, with a 24/7 schedule. Previously, the 89 MHz frequency hosted the following channels:
  - Health, environment and safety consumering programmes, 17/7. True to its name, this radio station is available on 89.0 FM in Hanoi, HCMC and several areas. Before April 1st 2023, the station was the home of Xone FM with programme broadcast from 6am-1pm and 5pm-10pm; at that time VOV FM 89 became a secondary relay of VOV2, still with its normal 17 hours schedule, later reduced to 3 hours.
  - Emotion FM: Broadcast from June 2015, 24/7. This channel officially ceased broadcasting as of July 15th, 2016.
- VOV English 24/7 – English-language programmes, 18/7. Available on 104.0 FM in Hanoi, Hue and HCMC.

=== Other media platforms ===
- Voice of Vietnam: VOV's printing newspaper, first released on 2 November 1998. From 2012, the VOV newspaper format was switched to compact format; it was later reverse back to original Berliner format after a short time.
- VOV.VN: VOV's online site; first launched on 3 September 1999 under the name VOV NEWS.
- VOV Media: Multimedia applications, available on mobile.

== See also ==
- Television and mass media in Vietnam
- List of radio stations in Vietnam
