= CKRQ-FM =

First Nations community radio station in Whapmagoostui, Quebec

Coordinates: 55°16′36″N 77°45′27″W

- Whapmagoostui, Quebec; Canada
- Frequency: 96.5 MHz

Programming
- Format: First Nations community radio

Ownership
- Owner: Whapmagoostui Aeyouch Telecommunications

History
- First air date: September 27, 1994

Technical information
- ERP: 10 watts
- HAAT: 14 metres (46 ft)

CKRQ-FM is a First Nations community radio station that operates at 96.5 FM in Whapmagoostui, Quebec, Canada.

Owned by Whapmagoostui Aeyouch Telecommunications, the station received CRTC approval in 1994.
