= Triple H (Horsham) =

Coordinates: 36.711714°S 142.204899°E

3HHH is the callsign of a community radio station, providing services to the Rural City of Horsham, Victoria, Australia.

== Studios ==
The 3HHH studios are located at the Old Police Station in Horsham. The building is home to other community groups in the region, and also hosts an office for sales of V-Line road-coach services.

== Transmitter Site ==
The station is allocated a transmission power of 500 Watts, and operates from the town's central communications tower.

== Programs ==
3HHH broadcasts a variety of programs throughout the week, including specialist music styles, community groups and sporting clubs, local church groups and young peoples' programs. The radio station is a member of the CBAA and utilises its satellite programs services.
