= CHFR-FM =

Radio station in Hornby Island, British Columbia

Coordinates: 49°32′05″N 124°40′09″W

- Hornby Island, British Columbia; Canada
- Frequency: 96.5 MHz

Ownership
- Owner: Hornby Community Radio Society

History
- First air date: April 2, 2014 (approval)

Technical information
- Class: LP
- ERP: vertical polarization only: 50 watts
- HAAT: 62.4 metres (205 ft)

Links
- Website: CHFR Website

CHFR-FM is a Canadian English-language community FM radio station at 96.5 FM in Hornby Island, British Columbia which was approved for on-air broadcasting on April 2, 2014.

Owned by Hornby Community Radio Society, the station initially received CRTC approval in 2004 for a very low-power English-language developmental community radio station to broadcast at five watts at 91.5 FM; however, the station would be reassigned its new, and current, frequency at 96.5 FM in 2007. The station under its original license never went on the air, and its license had lapsed.

On August 17, 2010, Hornby Community Radio Society received a new license from the CRTC, with the same frequency and parameters. On April 2, 2014, the station received approval to operate under a standard community radio license at 96.5 MHz at 50 watts, replacing its previous developmental license.
