= KPIK-LP =

- Stayton, Oregon; United States
- Frequency: 96.5 MHz

Ownership
- Owner: Santiam Community Radio Corporation

History
- Former frequencies: 102.9 MHz (2003–2017)

Technical information
- Licensing authority: FCC
- Facility ID: 133093
- Class: L1
- ERP: 100 watts
- HAAT: 27 meters (89 ft)
- Transmitter coordinates: 44°45′33″N 122°44′50″W

Links
- Public license information: LMS

KPIK-LP (96.5 FM) is a low-power radio station licensed to Stayton, Oregon, United States. The station is currently owned by Santiam Community Radio Corporation.
