= KBUX =

- Quartzsite, Arizona; United States
- Broadcast area: La Paz County, Arizona
- Frequency: 96.5 MHz
- Branding: KBUX 96.5

Programming
- Format: Oldies; Classic hits Adult standards

Ownership
- Owner: Marvin Vosper Estate; (Dennis Vosper, Personal Representative for the Marvin Vosper Estate)

History
- First air date: 1988
- Former frequencies: 94.3 MHz (1988–2017)

Technical information
- Licensing authority: FCC
- Facility ID: 7694
- Class: A
- ERP: 3,000 watts
- HAAT: −47 meters (−154 ft)
- Transmitter coordinates: 33°41′2″N 114°13′58″W

Links
- Public license information: Public file; LMS
- Website: www.kbuxradio.com

KBUX (96.5 FM) is an Oldies, Classic hits, and Adult standards formatted broadcast radio station licensed to and serving Quartzsite, Arizona. KBUX is owned by the Marvin Vosper Estate, through licensee Dennis Vosper, Personal Representative for the Marvin Vosper Estate.

Broadcasting, studio, and offices location: 1010 W. Camel St., Quartzsite, AZ 85346.
