= KDUA-LP =

- Rogers, Arkansas; United States
- Frequency: 96.5 MHz

Programming
- Format: Catholic

Ownership
- Owner: St. Anthony of Padua Educational Association

History
- First air date: February 12, 2004
- Call sign meaning: PaDUA

Technical information
- Licensing authority: FCC
- Facility ID: 134998
- Class: L1
- ERP: 43 watts
- HAAT: 45.4 meters (149 feet)
- Transmitter coordinates: 36°19′49″N 94°08′06″W

Links
- Public license information: LMS

KDUA-LP (96.5 FM) is a radio station licensed to serve Rogers, Arkansas. The station is owned by the St. Anthony of Padua Educational Association. It airs a Catholic radio format.

The station was assigned the KDUA-LP call letters by the Federal Communications Commission on February 12, 2004.

== Programming ==
The station derives a portion of its programming from the EWTN Radio Network. The station is an affiliate of the Relevant Radio Network.
