= WLRE-LP =

Coordinates: 33.487°N 80.548°W

- Elloree, South Carolina; United States
- Broadcast area: Santee, South Carolina
- Frequency: 96.5 (MHz)
- Branding: "WLRE Radio"

Programming
- Format: Country

Ownership
- Owner: Elloree Educational Association

History
- First air date: March, 2000
- Former frequencies: 105.5 MHz (2003–2011); 92.9 MHz (2011–2017)
- Call sign meaning: W ELloREe

Technical information
- Licensing authority: FCC
- Class: FL
- ERP: 65 watts
- HAAT: 65 meters

Links
- Public license information: LMS

WLRE-LP is an LPFM country music formatted radio station in Elloree, South Carolina, broadcasting at 96.5 FM. WLRE-LP is co-owned by Elloree Educational Association, and Northern Bahamas Communications which also has other holdings.

== Programming ==
WLRE Radio was in test mode from September 2000 and went on the air in March 2001 playing a mix of traditional to modern country music they call "real country". WLRE Radio broadcasts live ballgames, church services, town and area events, and local news.

WLRE Radio changed frequencies from 105.5 to 92.9 FM on July 12, 2011, and to 96.5 FM on April 10, 2017. WLRE Radio had two FM translator on 96.5/96.3 from March 7, 2003 till March 10, 2017.

WLRE Radio streamed its audio/music from April 7, 2000, till June 12, 2013, on www.wlreradio.com until a lightning strike that hit the station and burned out most of its equipment. WLRE Radio returned to the air the next day on a back-up transmitter and back on the Internet on April 15, 2015, at its new location, www.wlre.net. WLRE Radio will return to www.wlreradio.com January 15, 2019.
