= KLMA =

- Hobbs, New Mexico; United States
- Frequency: 96.5 MHz
- Branding: "KLMA Radio 96.5FM"

Programming
- Format: Spanish variety

Ownership
- Owner: Ojeda Broadcasting, Inc.

Technical information
- Licensing authority: FCC
- Facility ID: 50155
- Class: C1
- ERP: 100,000 watts
- HAAT: 115 metres (377 ft)
- Transmitter coordinates: 32°28′5″N 103°09′27″W
- Translators: K252CV (98.3 MHz, Hobbs)

Links
- Public license information: Public file; LMS
- Webcast: Listen Live
- Website: klmaradio.com

KLMA (96.5 FM) is a radio station licensed to serve the community of Hobbs, New Mexico, USA. It is owned by Ojeda Broadcasting, Inc. and broadcasts a Spanish variety format.

The station was assigned the KLMA call letters by the Federal Communications Commission on November 10, 1993.
