= CIXN-FM =

Radio station in Fredericton, New Brunswick

Coordinates: 45°56′27″N 66°39′12″W

- Fredericton, New Brunswick; Canada
- Broadcast area: Greater Fredericton
- Frequency: 96.5 MHz
- Branding: Joy 96.5

Programming
- Format: Christian

Ownership
- Owner: Joy FM Network Inc.

History
- First air date: April 8, 2001

Technical information
- Class: A1
- ERP: 250 watts
- HAAT: 81.7 metres (268 ft)

Links
- Website: joyfm.ca

CIXN-FM (Joy 96.5) is a Canadian radio station in Fredericton, New Brunswick. It broadcasts Contemporary Christian music and other religious shows, and broadcasts at 96.5 MHz. The station has been on the air since April 8, 2001.
