= WIMR-LP =

- McIntosh, Florida; United States
- Frequency: 96.5 MHz

Programming
- Format: Country

Ownership
- Owner: Mcintosh Community Radio Association

Technical information
- Licensing authority: FCC
- Facility ID: 133396
- Class: L1
- ERP: 94 watts
- HAAT: 30.6 meters (100 ft)
- Transmitter coordinates: 29°26′57.00″N 82°13′36.00″W

Links
- Public license information: LMS

WIMR-LP (96.5 FM) is a radio station broadcasting a country music format. Licensed to McIntosh, Florida, United States, the station is currently owned by Mcintosh Community Radio Association.
