= WBHC-LP =

- Benton Harbor, Michigan; United States
- Frequency: 96.5 MHz
- Branding: Live 96.5

Programming
- Format: Community radio (African-American)

Ownership
- Owner: Benton Harbor Area Schools

History
- First air date: 2004

Technical information
- Licensing authority: FCC
- Facility ID: 126885
- Class: L1
- ERP: 100 watts
- HAAT: 15.8 meters (52 ft)
- Transmitter coordinates: 42°06′55″N 86°27′13″W

Links
- Public license information: LMS

WBHC-LP (96.5 FM, "Live 96.5") is an American low-power FM radio station licensed to serve the community of Benton Harbor, Michigan. The station, established in 2004, is owned and operated by Benton Harbor Area Schools under a license granted by the Federal Communications Commission (FCC).

== Programming ==
The station, normally airs a community radio format oriented toward the African-American community of Benton Harbor, including soul music, jazz, hip-hop and dance music, local sports play-by-play, and gospel programming.

== History ==
In August 2000, the City of Benton Harbor applied to the FCC for a construction permit for a new low-power broadcast radio station. The FCC granted this permit on June 17, 2003, with a scheduled expiration date of December 17, 2004. The new station was assigned call sign "WBHC-LP" on July 16, 2003. After modifications, construction, and testing were completed in December 2004, the station was granted its broadcast license on November 30, 2005.

Media reports state that Joe Harris, the Emergency Manager appointed by the Governor of Michigan to oversee Benton Harbor, shut down the radio station effective January 1, 2012. (As of February 13, 2012, the FCC has yet to receive the legally required "silent" notification from the station nor a request for special temporary authority to remain silent.) As of October 2012, the station was still on the air.

The station made national headlines in February 2012 when its broadcast license, transmitter, antenna, and studio equipment were offered for auction on eBay with a starting bid of $5,000. The auction was ended early over concerns of the legality of transferring a license without FCC authorization.

WBHC-LP was sold in January 2013 to Benton Harbor Area Schools. The sale was consummated on March 7, 2013 at a price of $5,000.
