= 105.5 FM =

FM radio frequency

The following radio stations broadcast on FM frequency 105.5 MHz:

== Argentina ==
- Antena 7 in Las Lajitas, Salta
- Atractiva in Presidencia de la Plaza, Chaco
- Balcarce Salta in Salta
- Cielo in Córdoba
- Concierto in Concepción, Tucumán
- del lago Esquel in Esquel, Chubut
- FM9 in Santa Fe de la Vera Cruz, Santa Fe
- LRM877 Hit in Pilar, Santa Fe
- Inolvidable in Mar del Plata, Buenos Aires
- Los 40 Principales in Buenos Aires
- Norte in Bahía Blanca, Buenos Aires
- Patagonia Madryn in Puerto Madryn, Chubut
- Pop in San Bernardo, Buenos Aires
- Radio 2 in Jujuy
- Red TL in Rosario, Santa Fe
- Villa Santa Rosa in Villa Santa Rosa, Córdoba
- Total in Junín de los Andes, Neuquén

== Australia ==
- 2CSF in Coffs Harbour, New South Wales
- 3REG in Sale, Victoria
- ABC Classic in Ballarat, Victoria
- ABC NewsRadio in Rockhampton, Queensland
- Rox FM in Roxby Downs, South Australia
- SBS Radio in Canberra, Australian Capital Territory
- Triple J in Townsville, Queensland; Adelaide, South Australia; and Smithton, Tasmania

== Canada (Channel 288) ==
- CFMT-FM in Mt-Tremblant, Québec
- CBEF-2-FM in Windsor, Ontario
- CBKK-FM in Patuanak, Saskatchewan
- CBKS-FM in Saskatoon, Saskatchewan
- CFBK-FM in Huntsville, Ontario
- CFIN-FM-2 in Saint-Malachie, Quebec
- CFIN-FM-3 in Saint-Anselme, Quebec
- CFIN-FM-4 in Saint-Jean-d'Orleans, Quebec
- CHRY-FM in Toronto, Ontario
- CHUB-FM in Red Deer, Alberta
- CHXX-FM-1 in Ste-Croix-de-Lotbiniere, Quebec
- CIAM-FM-19 in Prespatou, British Columbia
- CICY-FM in Selkirk, Manitoba
- CJFW-FM-7 in Houston, British Columbia
- CKGS-FM in La Baie, Quebec
- CKLD-FM in Thetford-Mines, Quebec
- CKQK-FM in Charlottetown, Prince Edward Island
- VF2292 in Carol Lake Mining, Newfoundland and Labrador
- VF2360 in Carcross, Yukon

== China ==
- Huazhou Radio in Huazhou, Maoming

== France ==
- France Info: several locations including the Eiffel Tower at Paris

== Indonesia ==
- RRI Batam Pro-2 in Batam and Singapore

== Ireland ==
- Today FM

== Israel ==
- Kan Gimel in Beersheba and Haifa

== Malaysia ==
- Zayan in Kuala Terengganu, Terengganu (Coming Soon)

== Mexico ==
- XHAGR-FM in Acapulco, Guerrero
- XHAKUM-FM in Akumal, Quintana Roo
- XHARI-FM in Nacozari, Sonora
- XHATL-FM in Atlacomulco, Estado de México
- XHBO-FM in San José de la Sonaja, Guanajuato
- XHCMS-FM in Mexicali, Baja California
- XHCSCR-FM in Cabo San Lucas, Baja California Sur
- XHFCE-FM in Huayacocotla, Veracruz
- XHHE-FM in Atotonilco El Alto, Jalisco
- XHHIT-FM in Puebla, Puebla
- XHHZ-FM in La Paz, Baja California Sur
- XHIE-FM in Matehuala, San Luis Potosí
- XHOBA-FM in Orizaba, Veracruz
- XHPECO-FM in Ciudad Frontera, Coahuila
- XHPET-FM in Peto, Yucatán
- XHRE-FM in Piedras Negras, Coahuila
- XHUGA-FM in Ameca, Jalisco

== Philippines ==
- DZVI in Padre Garcia, Batangas
- DWAA in San Fernando City, La Union
- DWDU in Clark Freeport Zone
- DWOM in Calapan City
- DWDR in Sorsogon City
- DYMY in Bacolod City
- DYBR in Bais City
- DWRG-FM in Naga City
- DXSA in Malita, Davao Occidental
- DXDX in Iligan City
- DXYD in Trento, Agusan Del Sur
- DXUP in Upi, Maguindanao

== United Kingdom ==
- 105.5 The Point in Milton Keynes, England
- Greatest Hits Radio Devon
- Swindon 105.5 in Swindon, England
- Today FM
- Warminster Community Radio (WCR)

== United States (Channel 288) ==
- KACT-FM in Andrews, Texas
- KAGF-LP in Twin Falls, Idaho
- KAIZ in Avondale, Arizona
- KBAJ in Deer River, Minnesota
- KBKK in Ball, Louisiana
- KBOA-FM in Piggott, Arkansas
- KBUE in Long Beach, California
- KCGB-FM in Hood River, Oregon
- KCMZ in Ozona, Texas
- KDDG in Albany, Minnesota
- KDDK in Addis, Louisiana
- KDEP in Garibaldi, Oregon
- KDLS-FM in Perry, Iowa
- KEBL-LP in Sulphur, Louisiana
- KESM-FM in El Dorado Springs, Missouri
- KEUG in Veneta, Oregon
- KEUN-FM in Eunice, Louisiana
- KFAC-LP in Twisp, Washington
- KFMT-FM in Fremont, Nebraska
- KFYV in Ojai, California
- KGFY in Stillwater, Oklahoma
- KHFN-LP in Nazareth, Texas
- KILJ-FM in Mount Pleasant, Iowa
- KIMW in Heflin, Louisiana
- KJAC in Timnath, Colorado
- KKHB in Eureka, California
- KKJO-FM in Saint Joseph, Missouri
- KKKJ in Merrill, Oregon
- KKOY-FM in Chanute, Kansas
- KLCY in Vernal, Utah
- KLHB in Portland, Texas
- KMAV-FM in Mayville, North Dakota
- KMGM in Montevideo, Minnesota
- KMOM in Roscoe, South Dakota
- KNAS in Nashville, Arkansas
- KPFM in Mountain Home, Arkansas
- KPMW in Haliimaile, Hawaii
- KQLJ-LP in Roundup, Montana
- KQRI in Bosque Farms, New Mexico
- KQXX-FM in Mission, Texas
- KRBI-FM in Saint Peter, Minnesota
- KRDO-FM in Security, Colorado
- KRIX in Port Isabel, Texas
- KRMI-LP in Manhattan, Kansas
- KRVR in Copperopolis, California
- KSAC-FM in Dunnigan, California
- KSJG-LP in Lewistown, Montana
- KSNX in Heber, Arizona
- KSXM-LP in Salem, Oregon
- KSZX in Santa Anna, Texas
- KTHK in Idaho Falls, Idaho
- KTRZ in Taos, New Mexico
- KUKN in Longview, Washington
- KUPO-LP in Port Orford, Oregon
- KUSJ in Harker Heights, Texas
- KVSV-FM in Beloit, Kansas
- KVVS in Rosamond, California
- KWAK-FM in Stuttgart, Arkansas
- KWBB-LP in Big Bear Lake, California
- KWCO-FM in Chickasha, Oklahoma
- KWDO in San Joaquin, California
- KWRF-FM in Warren, Arkansas
- KXCS in Coahoma, Texas
- KXFC in Coalgate, Oklahoma
- KXRU-LP in Portland, Oregon
- KYEL in Danville, Arkansas
- KZQL in Mills, Wyoming
- KZZT in Moberly, Missouri
- WABO-FM in Waynesboro, Mississippi
- WBHU in Saint Augustine Beach, Florida
- WBGI in Bethlehem, West Virginia
- WBMI in West Branch, Michigan
- WBNT-FM in Oneida, Tennessee
- WBTT in Naples Park, Florida
- WBYA in Islesboro, Maine
- WCCP in Clemson, South Carolina
- WCHO in Washington Court Hou, Ohio
- WCHX in Lewistown, Pennsylvania
- WCOO in Kiawah Island, South Carolina
- WCXX-LP in Cincinnati, Ohio
- WDAR in Darlington, South Carolina
- WDBA-LP in Farmingdale, New York
- WDBY in Patterson, New York
- WDHA in Dover, New Jersey
- WDMB-LP in Queens, New York
- WDUV in New Port Richey, Florida
- WERC-FM in Hoover, Alabama
- WFBZ in Trempealeau, Wisconsin
- WFCT in Apalachicola, Florida
- WFDT in Aguada, Puerto Rico
- WFJA in Sanford, North Carolina
- WGKL in Gladstone, Michigan
- WGOJ in Conneaut, Ohio
- WGTH in Richlands, Virginia
- WHFK-LP in Red Oak, North Carolina
- WHLQ in Lawrenceville, Virginia
- WIFO in Jesup, Georgia
- WINC-FM in Berryville, Virginia
- WIRI in Nekoosa, Wisconsin
- WJFU-LP in White Springs, Florida
- WJKG in Altamont, Illinois
- WJVO in South Jacksonville, Illinois
- WJYY in Concord, New Hampshire
- WKDE in Altavista, Virginia
- WKIO in Monticello, Illinois
- WKQV in Cowen, West Virginia
- WKXH in Saint Johnsbury, Vermont
- WKYA in Greenville, Kentucky
- WLDW in Salisbury, Maryland
- WLGY in Pennington Gap, Virginia
- WLJE in Valparaiso, Indiana
- WLPN-LP in Chicago, Illinois
- WLPW in Lake Placid, New York
- WLVK in Fort Knox, Kentucky
- WLXF in Macon, Georgia
- WMGH-FM in Tamaqua, Pennsylvania
- WMKD in Pickford, Michigan
- WMKX in Brookville, Pennsylvania
- WMMM in Verona, Wisconsin
- WMVR in Sidney, Ohio
- WNJH in Cape May Court House, New Jersey
- WNPD-LP in Nantucket, Massachusetts
- WNSP in Bay Minette, Alabama
- WOJL in Louisa, Virginia
- WOLL in Hobe Sound, Florida
- WQEQ-LP in Flushing, New York
- WQGN in Groton, Connecticut
- WQHU-LP in Huntington, Indiana
- WQLJ in Water Valley, Mississippi
- WQQO in Sylvania, Ohio
- WQRK in Bedford, Indiana
- WRAR in Tappahannock, Virginia
- WREZ in Metropolis, Illinois
- WRQR-FM in Paris, Tennessee
- WRXJ-LP in Winooski, Vermont
- WRXR in Rossville, Georgia
- WSEV in Gatlinburg, Tennessee
- WSFT-LP in Berrien Springs, Michigan
- WSKU in Little Falls, New York
- WSRJ in Honor, Michigan
- WSSQ in Sterling, Illinois
- WTHD in Lagrange, Indiana
- WTKV in Minetto, New York
- WTMS-LP in Kissimmee, Florida
- WVBG-FM in Redwood, Mississippi
- WVIG in West Terre Haute, Indiana
- WVNA in Muscle Shoals, Alabama
- WWCK in Flint, Michigan
- WWEI in Easthampton, Massachusetts
- WWWK in Islamorada, Florida
- WXQR in Jacksonville, North Carolina
- WXTQ in Athens, Ohio
- WYKT in Wilmington, Illinois
- WYRL-LP in Rice Lake, Wisconsin
- WYTM-FM in Fayetteville, Tennessee
- WYZB in Mary Esther, Florida
- WZBN (FM) in Camilla, Georgia
- WZNN in Mount Sterling, Kentucky
- WZSR in Woodstock, Illinois
