= Kago (disambiguation) =

A kago is a type of vehicle formerly used in Japan.

Kago or KAGO may refer to:

- Kago language, spoken in Ivory Coast
- KAGO (AM), a radio station (1150 AM) licensed to serve Klamath Falls, Oregon, United States
- KAGO-FM, a radio station (94.9 FM) licensed to serve Altamont, Oregon
- KFXX-FM, a radio station (99.5 FM) licensed to serve Klamath Falls, Oregon, which held the call sign KAGO-FM from 1980 to 2017
- Magnolia Municipal Airport (ICAO code KAGO)

== People with the name ==
- Ai Kago (born 1988), Japanese singer, actress and author
- Danson Kago (born 1994), Kenyan footballer
- Gervais Kago (born 1987), footballer from the Central African Republic
- Shintaro Kago (born 1969), Japanese manga artist

== See also ==
- Cago, a rock album
- Cagot, a historic minority of France and Spain
