= KFXX =

KFXX may refer to:

- KFXX-FM, a radio station (99.5 FM) licensed to serve Klamath Falls, Oregon, United States
- KAGO-FM, a radio station (94.9 FM) licensed to serve Altamont, Oregon, which held the call sign KFXX-FM from 2016 to 2017
- KRSK (AM), a radio station (1080 AM) licensed to serve Portland, Oregon, which held the call sign KFXX from 2004 to 2025
- KMTT, a radio station (910 AM) licensed to serve Vancouver, Washington, United States, which held the call sign KFXX from 1998 to 2004
- KGDD (AM), a radio station (1520 AM) licensed to serve Oregon City, Oregon, which held the call sign KFXX from 1989 to 1998
- KHGN (FM), a radio station (106.7 FM) licensed to serve Hugoton, Kansas, United States, which held the call signs KFXX or KFXX-FM from 1989 to 2016
- KTZR (AM), a radio station (1450 AM) licensed to serve Tucson, Arizona, United States, which held the call sign KFXX in 1988
