= KFLS =

KFLS may refer to:

- KFLS (AM), a radio station (1450 AM) licensed to Klamath Falls, Oregon, United States
- KFLS-FM, a radio station (96.5 FM) licensed to Tulelake, California, United States
