= KACT =

KACT may refer to:

- KACT (AM), a radio station (1360 AM) licensed to Andrews, Texas, United States
- KACT-FM, a radio station (105.5 FM) licensed to Andrews, Texas, United States
- the ICAO code for Waco Regional Airport
