= KRJW =

- Altamont, Oregon; United States
- Broadcast area: Klamath Falls, Oregon
- Frequency: 1240 KHz
- Branding: La Patrona 106.5

Programming
- Format: Regional Mexican

Ownership
- Owner: Wynne Broadcasting Company, Inc.; (Cove Road Publishing, LLC)
- Sister stations: KFLS; KFLS-FM; KKKJ; KFEG; KKRB

History
- First air date: February 6, 2014

Technical information
- Licensing authority: FCC
- Facility ID: 160745
- Class: C
- Power: 1,000 watts
- Transmitter coordinates: 42°12′18″N 121°45′39″W
- Translator: 106.5 K293CQ (Altamont)

Links
- Public license information: Public file; LMS
- Webcast: Listen Live
- Website: KRJW Online

KRJW (1240 AM, a.k.a. "La Patrona 106.5") is a radio station broadcasting a Regional Mexican format. It is licensed to Altamont, Oregon, and serves Klamath Falls, Oregon, and the surrounding areas. The station is currently owned by Wynne Broadcasting, LLC, and licensed to Cove Road Publishing, LLC.

== History ==
KRJW was granted its FCC license on February 6, 2014 and hit the air soon afterward as a way to fill the void left when rival station KLAD acquired the full-time broadcast affiliation rights of ESPN Radio in 2014. Sister station KFLS had been an affiliate of ESPN Radio on a part-time basis for a number of years before KLAD acquired the full-time rights. KRJW immediately became an affiliate of CBS Sports Radio and the new full-time home of Jim Rome, who had previous been featured on its previous station.

The station would soon begin airing Portland Trail Blazers NBA basketball and University of Oregon Ducks football and basketball shortly after signing on the air and moving over from KFLS. In 2016, the station became the new home station for Mazama High School Vikings sports, with Randy Adams on the call.

On May 5, 2023, KRJW changed its format from sports to Regional Mexican, branded as "La Patrona 106.5".
