= WWWK (disambiguation) =

WWWK is a radio station (105.5 FM) licensed to Islamorada, Florida.

WWWK may also refer to:

- WAVK, a radio station (97.7 FM) licensed to Marathon, Florida, which held the call sign WWWK from 1999 to 2003
- WRWB-FM, a radio station (99.3 FM) licensed to Ellenville, New York, which held the call sign WWWK from 1989 to 1995
- WWWT-FM, a radio station (107.7 FM) licensed to Manassas, Virginia, which held the call sign WWWK from 1982 to 1984
- WARH, a radio station (106.5 FM) licensed to Granite City, Illinois, which held the call sign WWWK from 1977
