= Klamath Falls, Oregon =

- City
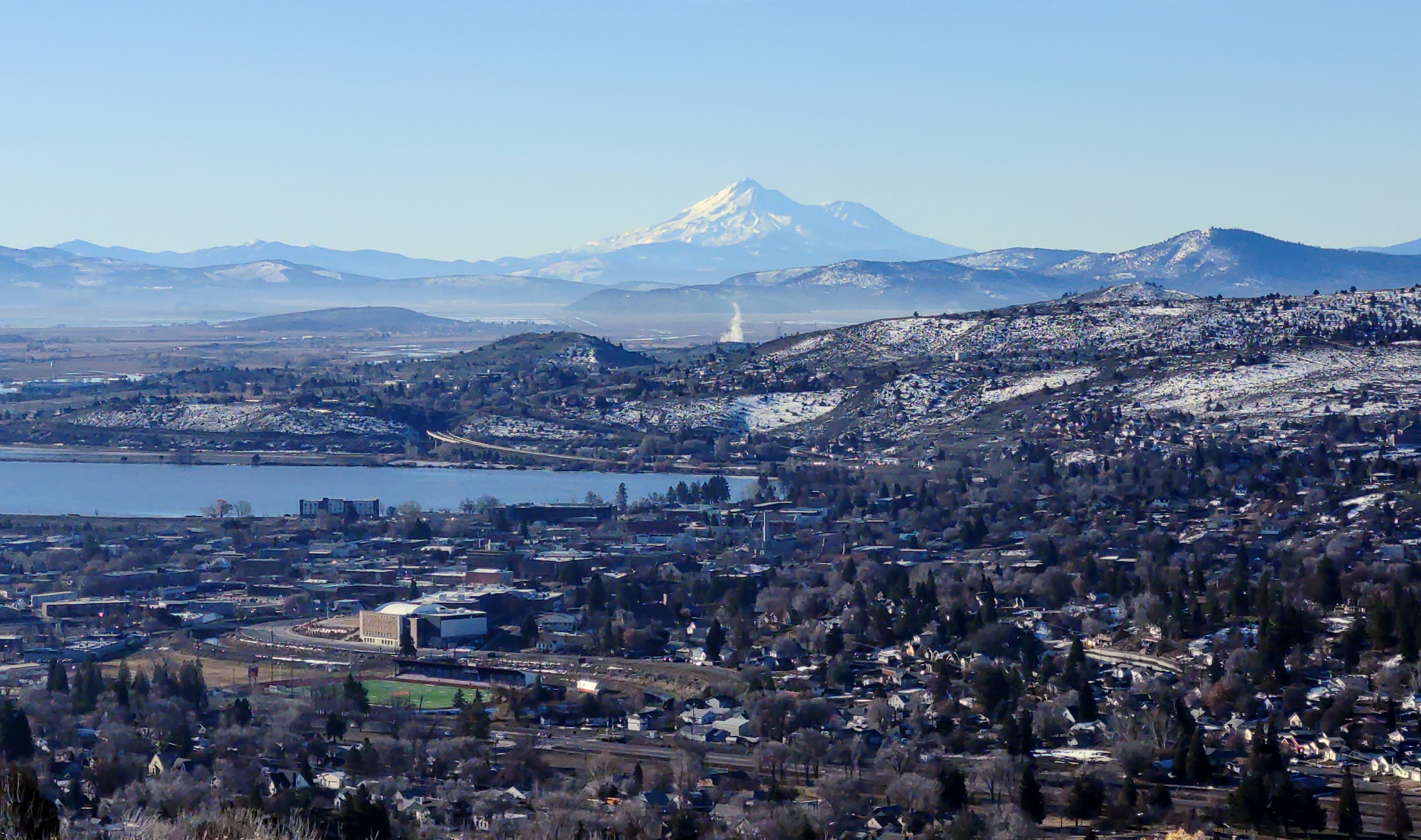
- Nickname: Oregon's City of Sunshine
- Motto: "Working For You"
- Location in Oregon

- Location in the United States Klamath Falls (the United States)
- Coordinates: 42°14′30″N 121°46′24″W
- Country: United States
- State: Oregon
- County: Klamath
- Incorporated: 1905

Area
  - Total: 20.95 sq mi (54.27 km^{2})
  - Land: 20.08 sq mi (52.01 km^{2})
  - Water: 0.88 sq mi (2.27 km^{2})
- Elevation: 4,095 ft (1,248 m)

Population (2020)
  - Total: 21,813
  - Density: 1,086.3/sq mi (419.43/km^{2})
- Time zone: UTC−8 (Pacific)
  - Summer (DST): UTC−7 (Pacific)
- ZIP codes: 97601, 97603
- Area code: 541
- FIPS code: 41-39700
- GNIS feature ID: 2411554
- Website: klamathfalls.city

Klamath Falls (/ˈklæməθ/ KLAM-əth) is a city in and the county seat of Klamath County, Oregon, United States. The city was originally called Linkville when George Nurse founded the town in 1867. It was named after the Link River, on whose falls the city was sited. The name was changed to Klamath Falls in 1893. The population was 21,813 at the 2020 census. With its suburb Altamont, a census-designated place, the combined population of the towns is 42,046 residents. The city is on the southeastern shore of the Upper Klamath Lake, at the foothills of the Cascade Range, and is home to the Oregon Institute of Technology.

Logging was the first major industry of Klamath Falls.

== History ==
=== Etymology ===
At its founding in 1867, Klamath Falls was named Linkville. The name was changed to Klamath Falls in 1892–93. The name Klamath (/ˈklæməθ/) may be a variation of the descriptive native for "people" (in Chinookan) used by the Indigenous peoples of the Northwest Plateau to refer to the region.

=== History ===
The Klamath and Modoc peoples were the first known inhabitants of the area. The Modocs' homeland is about 20 miles (32 km) south of Klamath Falls, but when they were forced onto a reservation with their adversaries, the Klamath, a rebellion ensued and they hid out in nearby lava beds. This led to the Modoc War of 1872–1873, which was a hugely expensive campaign for the US Cavalry, costing an estimated $500,000, the equivalent of over $8 million in 2000. 17 Indigenous people and 83 Americans were killed.

The Applegate Trail, which passes through the lower Klamath area, was blazed in 1846 from west to east in an attempt to provide a safer route for emigrants on the Oregon Trail. The first non-Indigenous settler is considered to have been Wallace Baldwin, a 19-year-old civilian who drove fifty head of horses in the valley in 1852. In 1867, George Nurse named the small settlement "Linkville" because of Link River north of Lake Ewauna.

The Klamath Reclamation Project began in 1906 to drain marshland and move water to allow for agriculture. With the building of the main "A" Canal, water was first made available on May 22, 1907. Veterans of World War I and World War II were given homesteading opportunities on the reclaimed land.

During World War II, a Japanese-American internment camp, the Tule Lake War Relocation Center, was located in nearby Newell, California, and a satellite of the Camp White, Oregon, POW camp was located just on the Oregon–California border near the town of Tulelake, California. In May 1945, about 30 miles (48 km) east of Klamath Falls, (near Bly, Oregon) a Japanese Fu-Go balloon bomb killed a woman and five children on a church outing. This is said to be the only Japanese-inflicted casualty on the US mainland during the war.

Timber harvesting through the use of railroad was extensive in Klamath County for the first few decades of the 20th century. With the arrival of the Southern Pacific Transportation Company in 1909, Klamath Falls grew quickly from a few hundred to several thousand. Dozens of lumber mills cut fir and pine lumber, and the industry flourished until the late 1980s when the northern spotted owl and other endangered species were driving forces in changing western forest policy.

On September 20, 1993, a series of earthquakes struck near Klamath Falls. Many downtown buildings, including the county courthouse and the former Sacred Heart Academy and Convent, were damaged or destroyed; further, two people were killed.

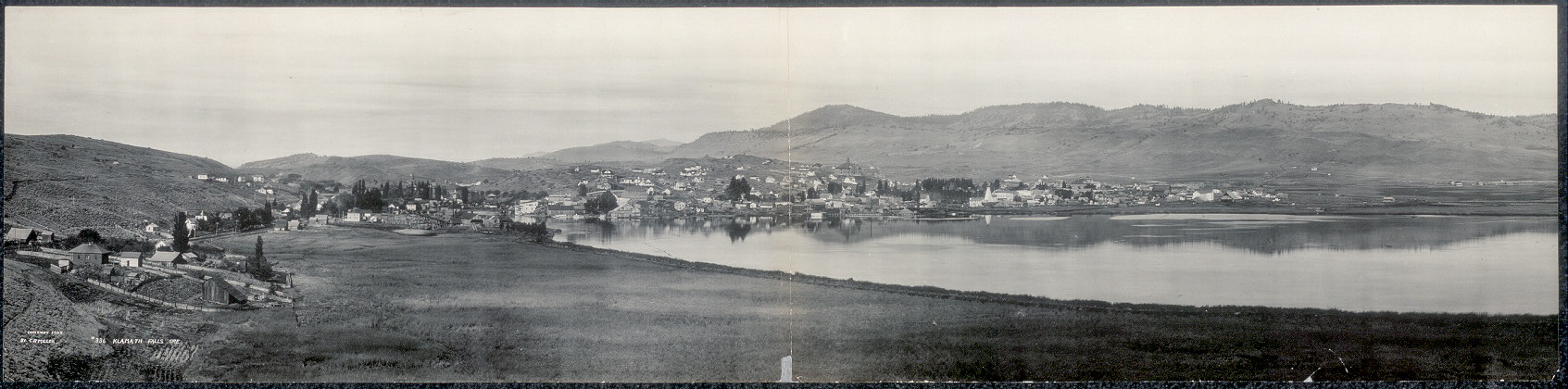
Klamath Falls, 1909

=== Water rights controversy ===
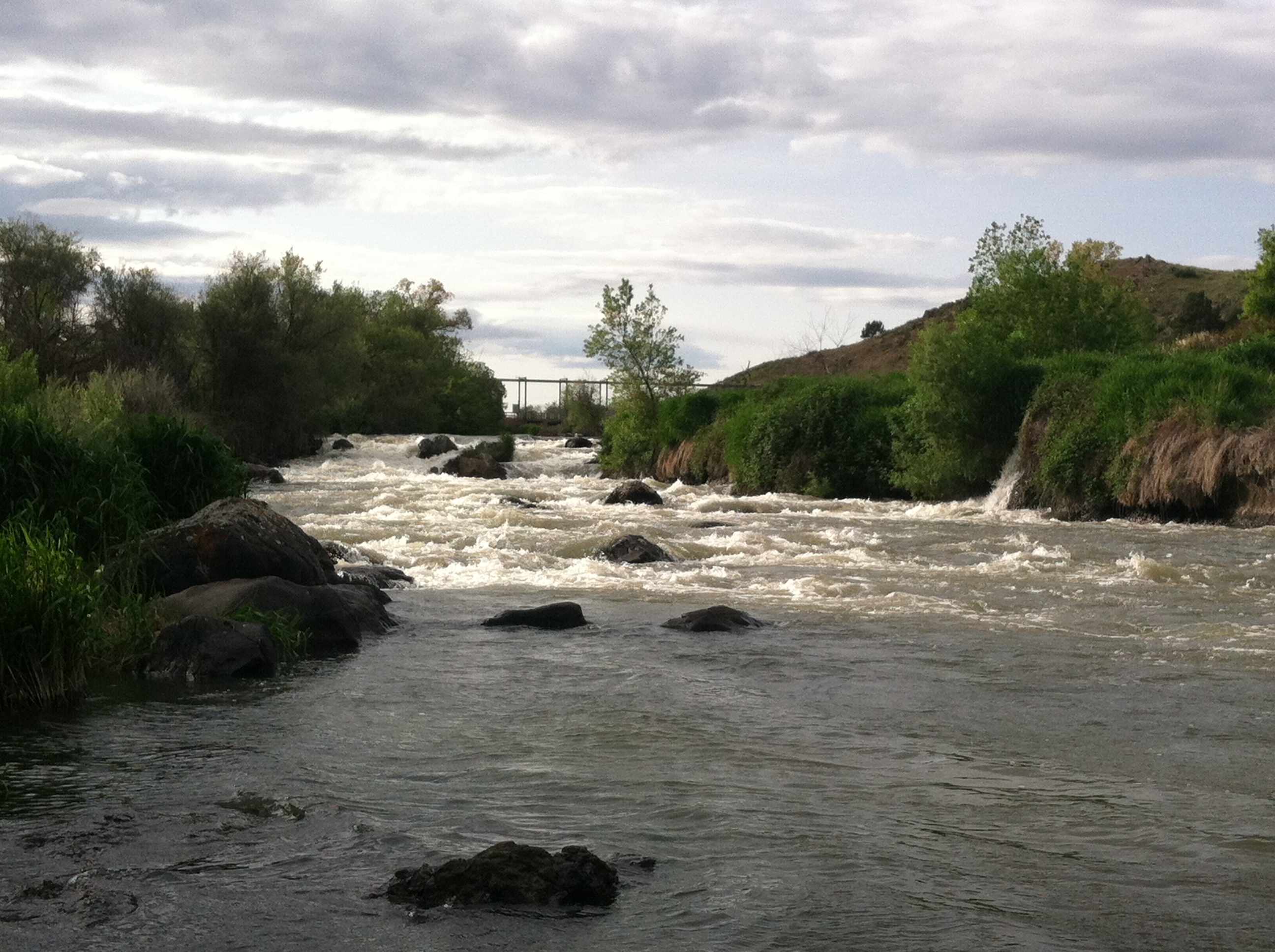
Link River downstream whitewater falls, from which Klamath Falls gets its name

The city made national headlines in 2001 when a court decision was made to shut off Klamath Project irrigation water on April 6, 2001, because of Endangered Species Act requirements. The Lost River sucker and shortnose sucker were listed on the Federal Endangered Species List in 1988, and when drought struck in 2001, a panel of scientists stated that further diversion of water for agriculture would be detrimental to these species, which reside in the Upper Klamath Lake, as well as to the protected Coho salmon which spawn in the Klamath River. Many protests by farmers and citizens culminated in a "Bucket Brigade" on Main Street May 7, 2001, in Klamath Falls. The event was attended by 18,000 farmers, ranchers, citizens, and politicians. Two giant bucket monuments have since been constructed and erected in town to commemorate the event. Such universal criticism resulted in a new plan implemented in early 2002 to resume irrigation to farmers.

Low river flows in the Klamath and Trinity rivers and high temperatures led to a mass die-off of at least 33,000 salmon in 2002. Dwindling salmon numbers have practically shut down the fishing industry in the region and caused over $60m in disaster aid being given to fishermen to offset losses. 90% of Trinity River water is diverted for California agriculture. As much as 90% of the Trinity's water, which would otherwise flow into the Klamath and out to sea, instead rushes south toward California's thirsty center.

According to a National Academy of Sciences report of October 22, 2003, limiting irrigation water did little if anything to help endangered fish and may have hurt the populations. A contrary report has criticized the National Academy of Sciences report. The Chiloquin Dam has been removed to help improve sucker spawning habitat.

In 2021 tensions between locals and the Federal Government led two local farmers to purchase land at the headgates in Klamath Falls, OR. These farmers have ties to the Ammon Bundy People's Rights organization and are preparing for a potential standoff situation with the government.

=== Geothermal heating ===
Klamath Falls is located in a known geothermal resource area. Geothermal power has been used directly for geothermal heating in the area since the early 1900s. A downtown district heating system was constructed in 1981 and extended in 1982. There was public opposition to the scheme. Many homes were heated by private geothermal wells, and owners were concerned that the city system could lower the water level and/or reduce water temperatures. System operation was delayed until 1984 following an aquifer study. Full operational testing showed no negative impact on the private wells. The system was shut down again in 1986 after multiple distribution piping failures were discovered. By 1991, the distribution piping had been reconstructed, and the system was again operating. The system has been expanded since then, and according to the Oregon Institute of Technology, the operation is "at or near operational break-even". The system is used to provide direct heat for homes, city schools, greenhouses, government and commercial buildings, geothermally heated snowmelt systems for sidewalks and roads, and process heat for the wastewater treatment plant.

=== Air quality ===
According to the Oregon Department of Environmental Quality in 2012, significant efforts are being made to improve the air quality in the Klamath Basin.

== Geography ==
According to the United States Census Bureau, the city has a total area of 20.66 square miles (53.51 km^{2}), of which 19.81 square miles (51.31 km^{2}) is land and 0.85 square miles (2.20 km^{2}) is water. The elevation is 4,094 feet (1,248 m).

Klamath Falls has a high desert landscape. The older part of the city is located above natural geothermal springs. These have been used for the heating of homes and streets, primarily in the downtown area.

=== Climate ===
Klamath Falls is known as "Oregon's City of Sunshine" because the area enjoys 300 days of sun per year. The Klamath Falls area is a high desert and features a climate with cold, snowy winters along with hot summer afternoons and cool summer nights. Under the Köppen climate classification the city's climate type is Csb, often described as warm summer Mediterranean. Using the 0 °C (32 °F) isotherm preferred by some climatologists, Klamath Falls is a Dsb climate, often described as warm summer humid continental.

Typical of its region, Klamath Falls has a dry season in summertime, with the greatest precipitation occurring in wintertime. A substantial proportion falls as snow. Although it is not arid or semi-arid, total precipitation is still low, at 13.41 inches (340.6 mm) per year, due to Klamath Falls being in the rain shadow of the Cascade Mountains to the west. The wettest "rain year" has been from July 1955 to June 1956 with 21.78 inches (553.2 mm) and the driest from July 1954 to June 1955 with 6.09 inches (154.7 mm). Annual snowfall averages around 36.5 inches (93 cm). The record maximum of 100.6 inches (256 cm) occurred between July 1955 and June 1956, while only a trace of snow fell between July 1991 and June 1992. The maximum snow depth has been 36 inches (91 cm) on January 3, 1901.

The all-time record high is 105 °F (40.6 °C), set on July 27, 1911, and the all-time record low is −24 °F (−31.1 °C), set on January 15, 1888. The freeze-free season averages around 120 days, with the first freeze in a typical year being on September 21, and the last freeze being on June 1. On average 18.2 days per year reach 90 °F (32.2 °C) or higher, and 1.9 nights per year reach temperatures of 0 °F (−17.8 °C) or lower.

Climate data for Klamath Falls, Oregon (1991–2020 normals, extremes 1897–present)
Month	Jan	Feb	Mar	Apr	May	Jun	Jul	Aug	Sep	Oct	Nov	Dec	Year
Record high °F (°C)	78 (26)	69 (21)	77 (25)	87 (31)	98 (37)	103 (39)	103 (39)	104 (40)	103 (39)	92 (33)	74 (23)	63 (17)	104 (40)
Mean maximum °F (°C)	53.1 (11.7)	58.4 (14.7)	67.8 (19.9)	75.6 (24.2)	83.4 (28.6)	90.7 (32.6)	96.3 (35.7)	95.1 (35.1)	89.5 (31.9)	78.8 (26.0)	65.1 (18.4)	51.9 (11.1)	97.6 (36.4)
Mean daily maximum °F (°C)	41.5 (5.3)	46.3 (7.9)	52.3 (11.3)	57.8 (14.3)	67.2 (19.6)	76.2 (24.6)	86.3 (30.2)	84.8 (29.3)	77.5 (25.3)	64.2 (17.9)	49.1 (9.5)	40.3 (4.6)	62.0 (16.7)
Daily mean °F (°C)	31.5 (−0.3)	34.9 (1.6)	39.4 (4.1)	43.5 (6.4)	51.7 (10.9)	58.8 (14.9)	67.1 (19.5)	65.6 (18.7)	58.2 (14.6)	47.4 (8.6)	37.0 (2.8)	30.4 (−0.9)	47.1 (8.4)
Mean daily minimum °F (°C)	21.5 (−5.8)	23.5 (−4.7)	26.5 (−3.1)	29.1 (−1.6)	36.2 (2.3)	41.4 (5.2)	47.8 (8.8)	46.5 (8.1)	39.0 (3.9)	30.7 (−0.7)	24.9 (−3.9)	20.6 (−6.3)	32.3 (0.2)
Mean minimum °F (°C)	5.7 (−14.6)	10.8 (−11.8)	16.1 (−8.8)	19.5 (−6.9)	24.8 (−4.0)	30.9 (−0.6)	39.1 (3.9)	38.4 (3.6)	29.3 (−1.5)	19.8 (−6.8)	11.1 (−11.6)	6.2 (−14.3)	−1.0 (−18.3)
Record low °F (°C)	−25 (−32)	−14 (−26)	−5 (−21)	10 (−12)	17 (−8)	23 (−5)	22 (−6)	28 (−2)	20 (−7)	8 (−13)	−7 (−22)	−20 (−29)	−25 (−32)
Average precipitation inches (mm)	1.51 (38)	1.12 (28)	1.03 (26)	1.06 (27)	1.04 (26)	0.66 (17)	0.22 (5.6)	0.28 (7.1)	0.30 (7.6)	0.74 (19)	1.38 (35)	1.80 (46)	11.14 (282.3)
Average snowfall inches (cm)	8.1 (21)	4.2 (11)	2.2 (5.6)	0.2 (0.51)	0.1 (0.25)	0.0 (0.0)	0.0 (0.0)	0.0 (0.0)	0.0 (0.0)	0.3 (0.76)	3.2 (8.1)	13.4 (34)	31.7 (81.22)
Average precipitation days (≥ 0.01 in)	10.9	9.4	10.7	9.1	8.4	4.7	1.6	2.4	2.6	5.6	10.4	12.2	88.0
Average snowy days (≥ 0.1 in)	3.9	2.5	1.5	0.2	0.0	0.0	0.0	0.0	0.0	0.1	2.1	4.7	15.0
Source: NOAA (snowfall 1981–2010)

== Demographics ==
Historical population
Census	Pop.	Note	%±
1880	250		—
1890	364		45.6%
1900	447		22.8%
1910	2,758		517.0%
1920	4,801		74.1%
1930	16,093		235.2%
1940	16,497		2.5%
1950	15,875		−3.8%
1960	16,949		6.8%
1970	15,775		−6.9%
1980	16,661		5.6%
1990	17,737		6.5%
2000	19,480		9.8%
2010	20,840		7.0%
2020	21,813		4.7%
Sources: U.S. Decennial Census; 2018 Estimate

=== 2020 census ===
As of the 2020 census, Klamath Falls had a population of 21,813. The median age was 36.1 years. 21.3% of residents were under the age of 18 and 17.5% of residents were 65 years of age or older. For every 100 females there were 98.3 males, and for every 100 females age 18 and over there were 97.7 males age 18 and over.

95.7% of residents lived in urban areas, while 4.3% lived in rural areas.

There were 9,089 households in Klamath Falls, of which 27.1% had children under the age of 18 living in them. Of all households, 34.9% were married-couple households, 23.8% were households with a male householder and no spouse or partner present, and 30.9% were households with a female householder and no spouse or partner present. About 35.1% of all households were made up of individuals and 14.9% had someone living alone who was 65 years of age or older.

There were 9,979 housing units, of which 8.9% were vacant. Among occupied housing units, 47.3% were owner-occupied and 52.7% were renter-occupied. The homeowner vacancy rate was 2.2% and the rental vacancy rate was 7.4%.

Racial composition as of the 2020 census
Race	Number	Percent
White	16,666	76.4%
Black or African American	275	1.3%
American Indian and Alaska Native	939	4.3%
Asian	391	1.8%
Native Hawaiian and Other Pacific Islander	42	0.2%
Some other race	1,137	5.2%
Two or more races	2,363	10.8%
Hispanic or Latino (of any race)	3,054	14.0%

=== 2010 census ===
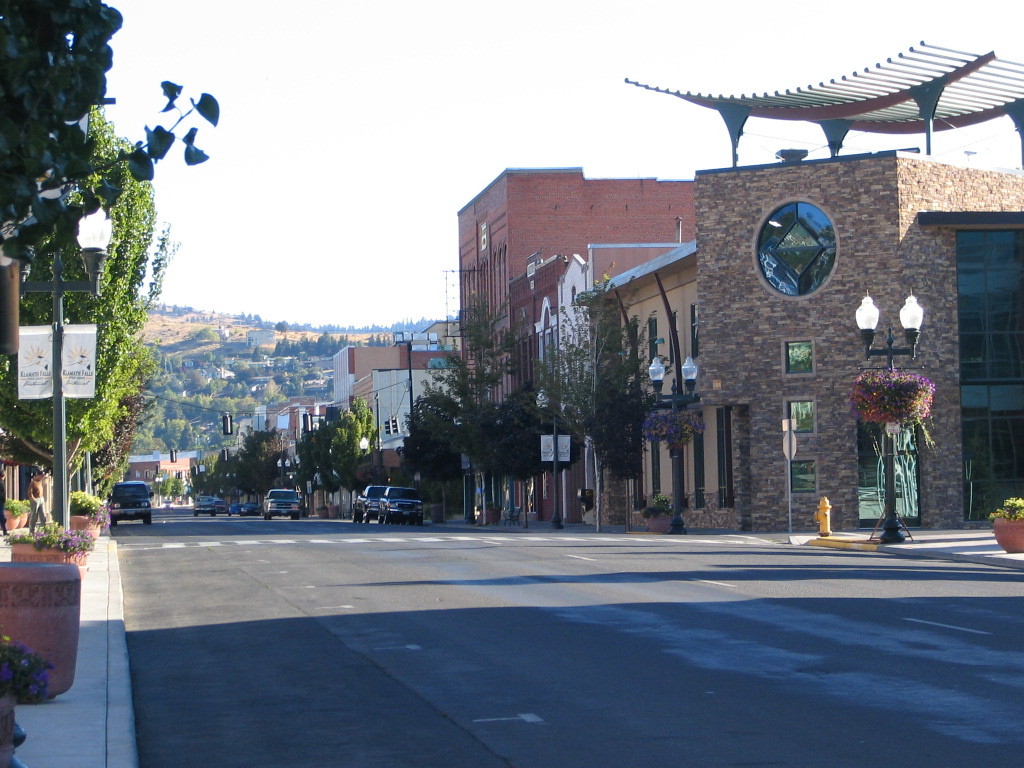
Downtown Klamath Falls

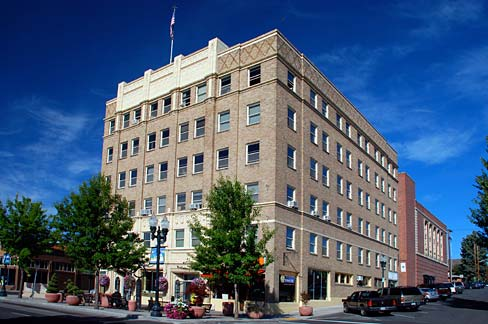
The Oregon Bank Building is one of 13 sites in Klamath Falls listed on the National Register of Historic Places.

As of the census of 2010, there were 20,840 people, 8,542 households and 4,876 families residing in the city. The immediate neighboring Census Designated Place of Altamont, Oregon, had a population of 19,257. The population density was 1,052.0 inhabitants per square mile (406.2/km^{2}). There were 9,595 housing units at an average density of 484.4 per square mile (187.0/km^{2}). The racial makeup of the city was 83.4% White, 1.0% African American, 4.3% Native American, 1.6% Asian, 0.1% Pacific Islander, 4.5% from other races, and 5.0% from two or more races. Hispanic or Latino residents of any race were 11.8% of the population.

There were 8,542 households, of which 30.4% had children under the age of 18 living with them, 38.5% were married couples living together, 13.0% had a female householder with no husband present, 5.6% had a male householder with no wife present, and 42.9% were non-families. 32.9% of all households were made up of individuals, and 11.3% had someone living alone who was 65 years of age or older. The average household size was 2.35 and the average family size was 2.98.

The median age in the city was 33.6 years. 23.6% of residents were under the age of 18; 14.6% were between the ages of 18 and 24; 25.2% were from 25 to 44; 24.1% were from 45 to 64; and 12.3% were 65 years of age or older. The gender makeup of the city was 49.3% male and 50.7% female.

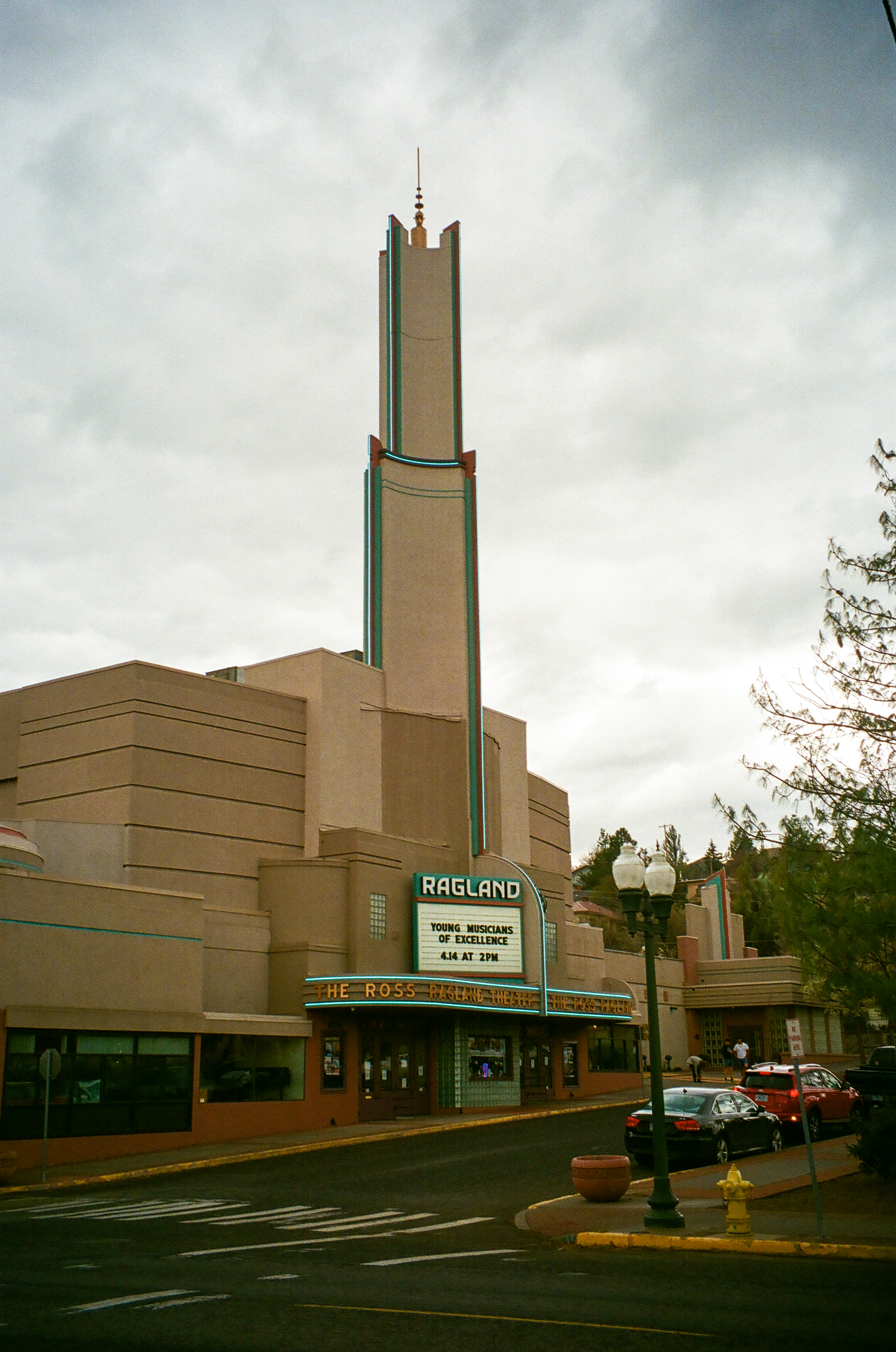
Ragland Theater in downtown Klamath Falls

=== 2000 census ===
As of the census of 2000, there were 19,462 people, 7,916 households, and 4,670 families residing in the city. The population density was 1,089.5/sq mi (420.7/km^{2}). There were 8,722 housing units at an average density of 488.3/sq mi (188.5/km^{2}).

The racial makeup of the city was:

- 85.12% White
- 1.02% African American
- 4.44% Native American
- 1.32% Asian
- 0.13% Pacific Islander
- 4.15% from other races
- 3.83% from two or more races

9.32% of the population were Hispanic or Latino of any race.

There were 7,916 households, out of which:

- 30.0% had children under the age of 18 living with them
- 42.2% were married couples living together
- 11.7% had a female householder with no husband present
- 41.0% were non-families
- 32.4% of all households were made up of individuals
- 11.9% had someone living alone who was 65 years of age or older

The average household size was 2.36 and the average family size was 2.99.

The age distribution was:

- 25.5% under the age of 18
- 13.1% from 18 to 24
- 27.2% from 25 to 44
- 21.5% from 45 to 64
- 12.8% who were 65 years of age or older

The median age was 33 years. For every 100 females, there were 101.9 males. For every 100 females age 18 and over, there were 100.1 males.

The median income for a household in the city was $28,498, and the median income for a family was $37,021. Males had a median income of $31,567 versus $22,313 for females. The per capita income for the city was $16,710. About 21.9% of the population and 16.2% of families were below the poverty line, including 26.8% of those under age 18 and 9.5% of those 65 or over.

== Parks and recreation ==
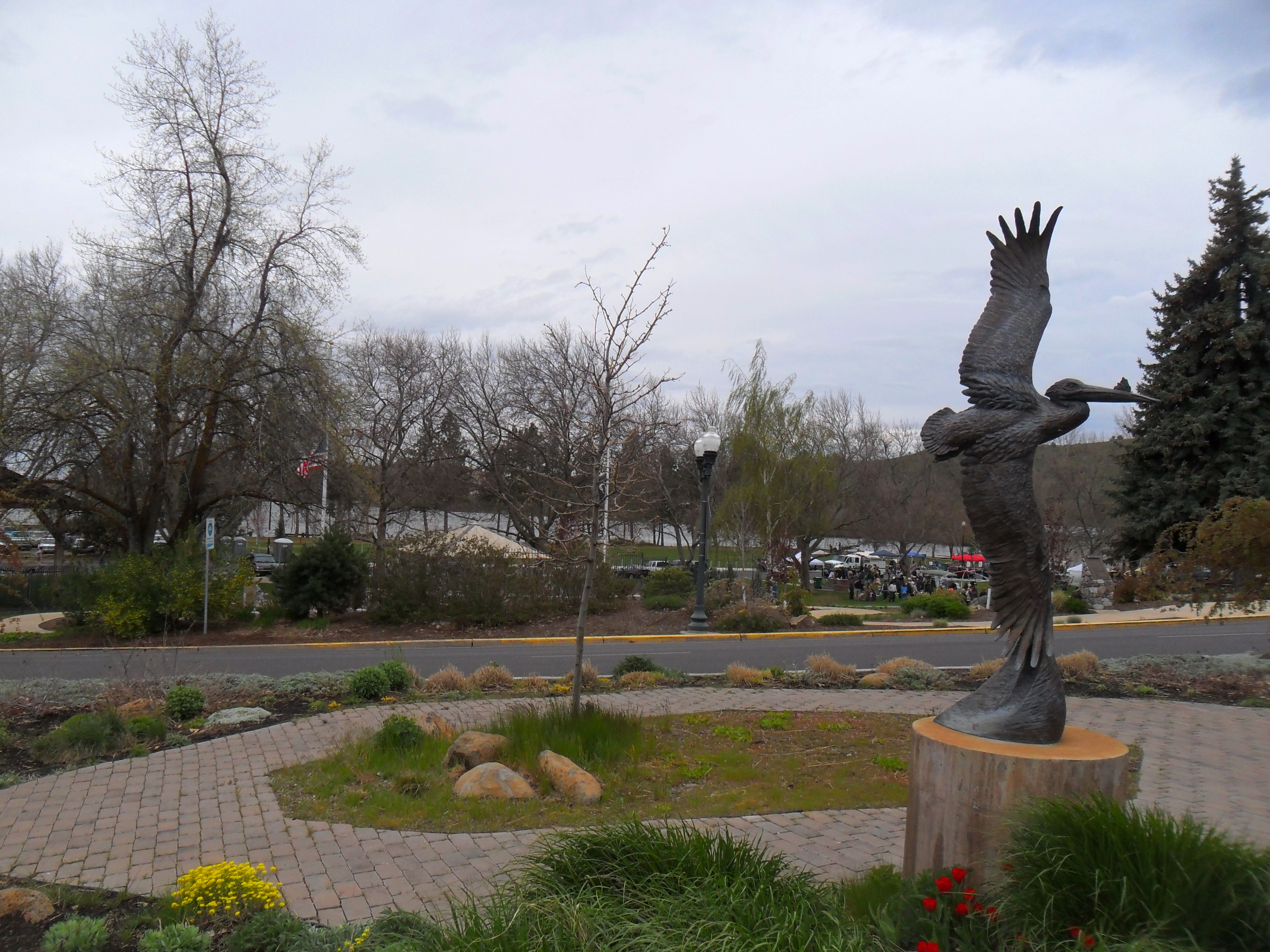
Veterans Park on the north shore of Lake Ewauna, downtown Klamath Falls

Moore Park features a multi-use trail network.

OC&E Woods Line State Trail is a rail trail in the city and the longest state park in Oregon.

Veterans Memorial Park is located downtown along Lake Ewauna.

Klamath Falls is located on the Pacific Flyway, and waterfowl, raptors, and American white pelican have been seen.

== Government ==
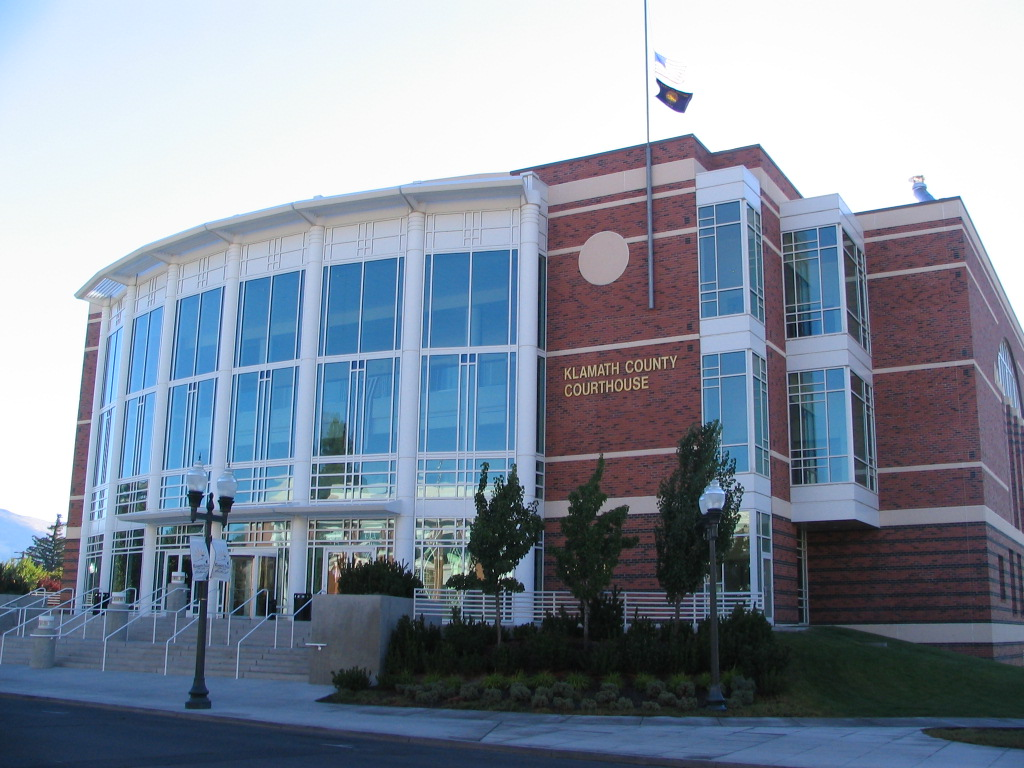
The Klamath County Courthouse

Klamath Falls is a home rule municipality under the Oregon Constitution, and has been governed by a council–manager form of government since its citizens voted to adopt the current charter in 1972. The city council, which is nonpartisan, has five members, each elected from one of the five wards. They serve four-year terms, which are staggered so that either two or three seats are up for election every two years. The mayor, who is nonpartisan and serves a term of four years, presides over all city council meetings. This official appoints committees, can veto any ordinance not passed with the affirmative vote of at least four council members, and casts tie-breaking votes. The city manager, however, is the administrative head of the city. This official is appointed by the council and serves an indefinite term at the council's pleasure. The municipal judge and the city attorney are appointed on the same basis. Todd Kellstrom was mayor from 1992 to 2016. Carol Westfall is the current mayor, having beaten Kellstrom in the 2016 election. Jonathan Teichert is the current city manager.

For the purpose of representation in the state legislature, Klamath Falls is located in the 28th Senate district, represented by Republican Dennis Linthicum, and in the 56th House district, represented by Republican E. Werner Reschke. Federally, Klamath Falls is located in Oregon's 2nd congressional district, which has a Cook Partisan Voting Index of R+10 and is represented by Republican Cliff Bentz.

== Education ==
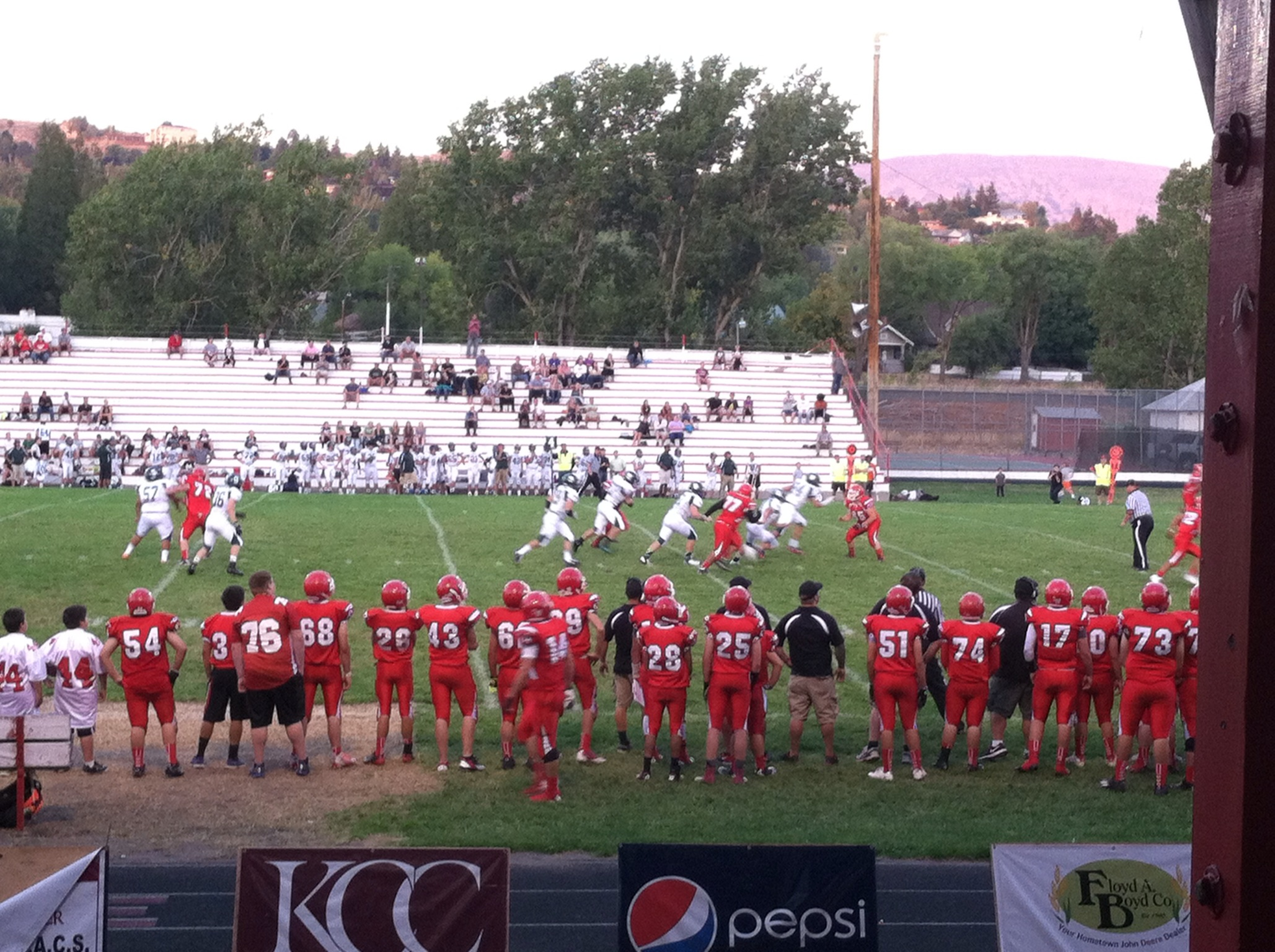
Klamath Union High School (KU) 2013 football team in action

=== Colleges and universities ===
- College of Cosmetology
- Klamath Community College
- Oregon Institute of Technology

=== Public schools ===
The majority of the Klamath Falls city limits, and parts of the surrounding are, are within the Klamath Falls City School District. Some parts of the city limits and all other parts of the county are within the Klamath County School District.

== Media ==
=== Radio stations ===
==== FM stations ====
- 88.5 FM - KLMF JPR classics & news service
- 88.9 FM - KJKF Contemporary Christian Music K-LOVE
- 89.5 FM - KTEC College Freeform Oregon Institute of Technology
- 89.9 FM - K210BY Christian
- 90.5 FM - K213AI Jefferson Public Radio news & information service
- 90.9 FM - KSKF Jefferson Public Radio rhythm & news service
- 91.5 FM - K218EX Spanish Christian
- 91.9 FM - K220BJ Jefferson Public Radio news & information service
- 92.5 FM - KLAD-FM Country
- 92.9 FM - K225CW News/Talk
- 93.3 FM - K227CU Rock
- 94.9 FM - KAGO-FM Rock
- 96.5 FM - KFLS-FM Country Tulelake
- 97.1 FM - K246BB Christian Keno
- 97.5 FM - KYSF Christian Worship Music Air 1 Bonanza
- 98.5 FM - KHIC Top 40 Keno
- 99.5 FM - KFXX-FM Classic Hits
- 99.9 FM - K260AK Christian
- 100.7 FM - KLKF Contemporary Christian Music K-LOVE Malin
- 101.3 FM - K267CF Christian
- 102.5 FM - K273DF News/Talk
- 104.3 FM - K282CB Sports
- 104.7 FM - KFEG Classic Rock
- 105.5 FM - KKKJ Top 40 Merrill
- 106.5 FM - K293CQ Regional Mexican Altamont
- 106.9 FM - KKRB Adult Contemporary

==== AM stations ====
- 960 AM - KLAD Sports
- 1150 AM - KAGO News/Talk
- 1240 AM - KRJW Sports
- 1450 AM - KFLS News/Talk

=== Television stations ===
- Channel 2 KOTI - NBC
- Channel 15 K15KE-D KTVL - CBS
- Channel 22 KFTS - PBS
- Channel 30 K31NH KBLN-TV - 3ABN
- Channel 31 KDKF - ABC
- Channel 48 K26NB-D KFBI-LD MNT

=== Newspapers ===
- Herald and News
- Klamath Republican (defunct)

== Infrastructure ==
=== Transportation ===
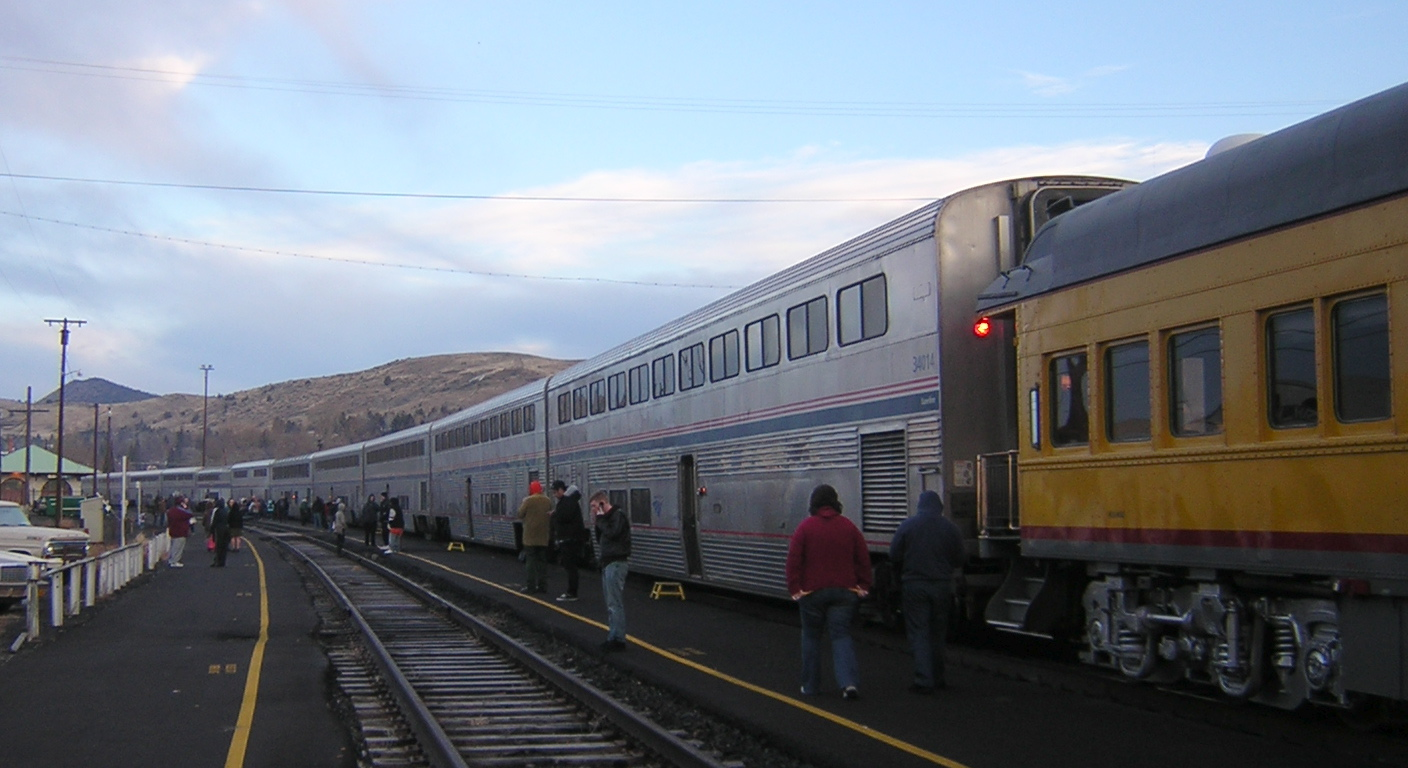
Amtrak's Coast Starlight at Klamath Falls station

Amtrak, the national passenger rail system, serves Klamath Falls station, located on a route originally built by the Southern Pacific Railroad – operating its Coast Starlight daily in both directions between Seattle, Washington and Los Angeles, California.

Fixed-route public transit service is operated by Basin Transit Service, a special service district with an elected board. Oregon POINT connects Klamath Falls with Medford and Brookings, Oregon. Sage Stage provides weekly service to Alturas, California.

The Crater Lake–Klamath Regional Airport is the location of the Kingsley Field Air National Guard Base; the airport and base are 6 miles (10 km) south of downtown. The nearest commercial airport is Rogue Valley International-Medford Airport, which is 78 miles (126 km) away.

=== Military airbase ===
Kingsley Field Air National Guard Base, also known as Crater Lake–Klamath Regional Airport, was established in 1928. It is home to the 270th Air Traffic Control Squadron, 173rd Fighter Wing of the Oregon Air National Guard, stationed at Kingsley Field airbase. The squadron currently flies F-15 C/D variants. It has the second-largest runway in Oregon (10,301 by 150 feet; 3,140 by 46 meters wide) and was listed as a backup landing strip for the Space Shuttle. It is normal to hear the aircraft throughout Klamath Falls during daylight hours.

== Notable people ==
- Sharron Angle (born 1949), Nevada politician
- Brenda Bakke (born 1963), actress
- Dennis Bennett (1939–2012), Major League Baseball player
- Harry D. Boivin (1904–1999), speaker of the Oregon House of Representatives
- Ernest C. Brace (1931–2014), pilot
- Jeff Bronkey (born 1965), Major League Baseball player
- Seth Brown (born 1992), Major League Baseball player for the Oakland Athletics
- Don Pedro Colley (1938–2017), actor
- Ian Dobson (born 1982), Team Run Eugene coach, and retired Olympic 5k runner
- Christine Drazan (born 1972), minority leader of the Oregon House of Representatives
- Chris Eyre (born 1968), Sundance Film Festival award winner
- Helen J. Frye (1930–2011), Federal District Court judge
- Chad Gray (born 1971), musician
- Rosie Hamlin (1945–2017), singer-songwriter
- Ralph Hill (1908–1994), Olympic 5000 meters silver medalist
- James Ivory (born 1928), Oscar-winning director, screenwriter and producer
- Charles S. Moore (1857–1915), Oregon politician
- Dan O'Brien (born 1966), Olympic gold medalist in Decathlon
- Charles O. Porter (1919–2006), Oregon politician
- Marty Ravellette (1939–2007), armless hero who lived in Klamath Falls in the 1960s
- Janice Romary (1927–2007), U.S. women's Olympic foilist
- Laurenne Ross (born 1988), World Cup alpine ski racer
- Kim Walker-Smith (born 1981), neopentecostal worship leader and recording artist
- Paul Zahniser (1896–1964), Major League Baseball player

== Sister city ==
Klamath Falls has one sister city, as designated by Sister Cities International:

- Rotorua, New Zealand

== See also ==
- Klamath Basin National Wildlife Refuges Complex
- Klamath County Event Center
- Klamath Falls Airport
- Klamath Lake
- Klamath Reclamation Project
- Klamath River
- OC&E Woods Line State Trail
