= WLGY =

WLGY may refer to:

- WLGY (FM), a radio station (105.5 FM) licensed to serve Pennington Gap, Virginia, United States
- WPAI, a radio station (90.7 FM) licensed to serve Nanty Glo, Pennsylvania, United States, which held the call sign WLGY from 2005 to 2007
- WBZI, a radio station (1500 AM) licensed to serve Xenia, Ohio, United States, which held the call sign WLGY from 1985 to 1987
