= WDBA =

WDBA may refer to:

- WDBA-LP, a low-power radio station (105.5 FM) licensed to serve Farmingdale, New York, United States
- WCOH (FM), a radio station (107.3 FM) licensed to serve Du Bois, Pennsylvania, United States, which held the call sign WDBA from 1975 to 2009
- Windsor-Detroit Bridge Authority, a Canadian federal Crown corporation
