= XEMX-AM =

Radio station in Mexicali, Baja California, Mexico

- Mexicali, Baja California; Mexico
- Frequency: 1120 kHz
- Branding: Noticias 1120 AM

Programming
- Format: News/talk

Ownership
- Owner: MVS Radio; (Stereorey México, S.A.)
- Sister stations: XHJC-FM, XHPF-FM, XHVG-FM

History
- First air date: May 18, 1988
- Call sign meaning: MeXicali

Technical information
- Licensing authority: CRT
- Class: C
- Power: 0.4 kW day/0.1 kW night
- Transmitter coordinates: 32°39′48″N 115°28′04″W

Links
- Webcast: Listen live
- Website: noticias1120am.com

XEMX-AM is a radio station on 1120 AM in Mexicali, Baja California, Mexico. It is a news/talk station and forms part of the city's MVS Radio cluster.

== History ==
XEMX received its concession on May 18, 1988. It was owned by Carlos Armando Madrazo y Pintado and sold to Sociedad Mexicana de Radio de Baja California in 1999. SOMER Baja California was folded into MVS proper in 2012. While MVS operated few AM stations in general (it was an early adopter of FM), it had an outsized cluster in Mexicali, consisting of XHJC-FM 91.5, XHPF-FM 101.9, XHVG-FM 103.3, XHCMS-FM 105.5, XEMVS-AM 820 and XEMX. XHCMS and XEMVS (now XHABCA) were sold in 2004.
