= XHVG-FM (Baja California) =

Radio station in Mexicali, Baja California, Mexico

- Mexicali, Baja California; Mexico
- Frequency: 103.3 MHz
- Branding: La Mejor

Programming
- Format: Grupera

Ownership
- Owner: MVS Radio; (Stereorey México, S.A.)
- Sister stations: XEMX-AM, XHJC-FM, XHPF-FM

History
- First air date: 2003
- Call sign meaning: Joaquín Vargas Gómez, founder of MVS Radio

Technical information
- Licensing authority: CRT
- Class: B
- ERP: 14,118 watts
- HAAT: 60.8 m (199 ft)
- Transmitter coordinates: 32°38′37″N 115°27′09″W

Links
- Website: lamejor.com.mx

XHVG-FM is a radio station on 103.3 FM in Mexicali, Baja California, Mexico. It is owned by MVS Radio and carries the La Mejor grupera format.

== History ==
XHVG came to the air in 1970. It was owned by Joaquín Vargas Gómez, founder of MVS Radio, and aired the company's Stereorey format. In 2002 it was replaced by Best FM, another format of English-language music. In 2003, Best FM was replaced with the La Mejor format after XHCMS-FM 105.5, which had been the La Mejor station, was sold to Grupo Imagen.
