= KWDC =

KWDC may refer to:

- KWDC-LP, a low-power radio station (93.5 FM) licensed to serve Stockton, California, United States
- KXCS, a radio station (105.5 FM) licensed to serve Coahoma, Texas, United States, which held the call sign KWDC from 2006 to 2010
- KDXX, a radio station (99.1 FM) licensed to serve Denton, Texas, which held the call sign KWDC from 1986 to 1988
