= XHHE =

XHHE may refer to:

- XHHE-FM, a radio station (106.9 FM) in Atotonilco El Alto, Jalisco, Mexico
- XHHE-TDT, a television station (channel 25, virtual 1) in Ciudad Acuña, Coahuila, Mexico
