= XHHZ-FM =

Radio station in La Paz, Baja California Sur, Mexico

- La Paz, Baja California Sur; Mexico
- Frequency: 105.5 FM
- Branding: La HZ

Programming
- Format: Norteña

Ownership
- Owner: Promomedios California; (Raúl Aréchiga Espinoza)

Technical information
- Licensing authority: CRT
- Class: B1
- ERP: 25,000 watts (FM)
- HAAT: 103.1 m (338 ft)
- Transmitter coordinates: 24°05′26″N 110°20′11″W

Links
- Webcast: Listen live
- Website: xehz.com

XHHZ-FM (105.5 FM, "La HZ") is a Mexican radio station that serves the area around La Paz, Baja California Sur, Mexico.

== History ==
XEHZ was the first broadcasting station owned by the Aréchiga Espinoza family and the second in Baja California Sur. It received its concession on December 4, 1963, and was approved to migrate to FM in 2011.
