= XHARE-FM =

Radio station in Ojinaga, Chihuahua

- Ojinaga, Chihuahua; Mexico
- Frequency: 97.7 MHz
- Branding: La Ke Buena

Programming
- Format: Regional Mexican
- Affiliations: Radiópolis

Ownership
- Owner: Sistema Radio Lobo; (Sucesión de Alfredo Rohana Estrada)

History
- First air date: June 12, 1981 (concession)
- Call sign meaning: Alfredo Rohana Estrada

Technical information
- Licensing authority: CRT
- Class: B1
- ERP: 25 kW
- HAAT: −2.9 m (−9.5 ft)
- Transmitter coordinates: 29°32′52″N 104°23′35″W

Links
- Webcast: https://streamingcwsradio30.com/7043/stream

XHARE-FM is a radio station on 97.7 FM in Ojinaga, Chihuahua. The station is owned by the succession of Alfredo Rohana Estrada and carries the Ke Buena national Regional Mexican format from Radiópolis.

== History ==
XHARE began on AM as XEARE-AM 1450, receiving its concession on June 12, 1981. It migrated to FM in 2011.

At one point in the mid-2010s, XHARE was just one of two remaining FM Globo stations in Mexico, along with MVS-owned XHPF-FM in Mexicali, Baja California. MVS began to use the format on more stations in 2018.

On August 3, 2020, XHARE-FM flipped from FM Globo to Ke Buena.
