= KLTG =

Radio station in Corpus Christi, Texas

Corpus Christi, Texas; United States
- Broadcast area: Corpus Christi metropolitan area
- Frequency: 96.5 MHz
- Branding: The Beach 96.5

Programming
- Format: Hot adult contemporary

Ownership
- Owner: Starlite Broadcasting
- Sister stations: KLHB

History
- First air date: September 1, 1967
- Former call signs: KIOU (1967–1987)
- Call sign meaning: Light (previous format)

Technical information
- Licensing authority: FCC
- Facility ID: 63342
- Class: C1
- Power: 100,000 watts
- HAAT: 247 meters (810 ft)
- Transmitter coordinates: 27°44′28″N 97°36′8″W

Links
- Public license information: Public file; LMS
- Webcast: Listen live
- Website: Beach965.com

KLTG (96.5 FM, "The Beach 96.5") is a commercial radio station licensed to Corpus Christi, Texas, United States, broadcasting a hot adult contemporary format. it is owned by Starlite Broadcasting with studios on Gordon Street in the Six Points district south of downtown Corpus Christi.

The transmitter is on Texas State Highway 188 in Taft.

== History ==
The station signed on the air on September 1, 1967. The original call sign was KIOU, owned by the Stereo Broadcasting Company with studios at Wilson Tower. Stephen DeWalt was the president and general manager. KIOU was a rare stand-alone FM station in that era, when most FM stations were co-owned with an AM or TV broadcaster. It was powered at 25,000 watts, a fraction of its current output.

Through most of its first two decades, KIOU aired a beautiful music format. It played quarter-hour sweeps of soft instrumental cover versions of popular adult songs, with Broadway and Hollywood show tunes.

By the mid-1980s, the audience for beautiful music stations was aging. KIOU added more vocals to appeal to a younger audience. It gradually eliminated the instrumentals, becoming a soft adult contemporary outlet. In 1987, it changed its call letters to KLTG as it aired "light" music. In the 1990s, it was owned by Nueces Radio Partners and was a mainstream AC station. In the early 2000s, it stepped up the tempo and eliminated older songs from its playlist, transitioning to adult top 40.
