= XHIE-FM =

Radio station in Matehuala, San Luis Potosí, Mexico

- Matehuala, San Luis Potosí; Mexico
- Frequency: 105.5 MHz
- Branding: Oye 105.5 FM Digital

Ownership
- Owner: Radio Medios Matehuala, S.A. de C.V.

History
- First air date: August 11, 1976 (concession)

Technical information
- Licensing authority: CRT
- Class: B1
- ERP: 25 kW
- HAAT: −17.4 m (−57 ft)
- Transmitter coordinates: 23°37′15″N 100°40′00″W

Links
- Website: www.oye105fmdigital.com

XHIE-FM is a radio station on 105.5 FM in Matehuala, San Luis Potosí, known as Oye 105.5 FM Digital.

== History ==
Logo as Stereo1030, used until November 2018

XEIE-AM 1450 received its concession on August 11, 1976. It was owned by José Luis Torres Castro and broadcast with 1,000 watts. In the early 1990s, it moved to 1030 with 5 kW day and 150 watts night. Radio Medios Matehuala acquired it in 2000, and it was cleared to move to FM on 106.3 MHz in 2010.

XHIE moved to 105.5 MHz on November 17, 2018 as a condition of the renewal of its concession, in order to clear 106-108 MHz as much as possible for community and indigenous stations. At the same time, it rebranded from Stereo1030 to Oye 105.5 FM Digital.
