= DZVI =

Radyo Natin Padre Garcia (DZVI)
- Padre Garcia; Philippines
- Broadcast area: Eastern Batangas, western parts of Quezon
- Frequency: 105.5 MHz
- Branding: Radyo Natin 105.5

Programming
- Language: Filipino
- Format: Community Radio
- Network: Radyo Natin

Ownership
- Owner: MBC Media Group
- Operator: LM Broadcast and Advertising

History
- First air date: 2000
- Former frequencies: 105.3 MHz (2000–2009, 2017-2018)
- Call sign meaning: Father VIcente Garcia; VI (Roman numeral of 6)

Technical information
- Licensing authority: NTC
- Power: 500 watts

DZVI (105.5 FM), broadcasting as Radyo Natin 105.5 is a radio station owned by the MBC Media Group and operated by the municipal affiliate LM Broadcast and Advertising. The station is located along Maharlika Highway, Brgy. San Felipe, Padre Garcia, Batangas.

== Station history ==
=== 2000-2014: Dual affiliation and inactivity ===
Radyo Natin Padre Garcia was established in 2000 on 105.3 FM. At that time, it was also an affiliate of the Philippine branch of the Faith Broadcasting Network, heavily carrying religious programs during Radyo Natin's clearance for local programming and preempting the latter, except during news of utmost importance.

The station was noted for occasional lengthy disclaimers from FBN disassociating its religious content from that of MBC's and American broadcasters who were already fluent with Filipino providing its program stingers and sermonettes.

In 2009, the station moved to 105.5 FM to make way for the Tayabas-based Radio City.

Due to lack of funding and frequency conflicts, the station close down by mid-2014. The frequency alternated between distant feeds from Calapan and Angeles City, Pampanga during the interregnum.

Notably, DZRH's Henry Uri was the station's newscaster under this timeframe, with his tenure lasting from 2000 until his promotion to the main network in 2002.

=== 2016-present: Revival and new investors ===
In October 2016, investors led by veteran Lipa City disk jock Queenie Kinita resurrected the station on a test broadcast. In the latter months, the revived station recruited more personnel, including former CitiBeat 102.3 jocks and Batangas blocktimer Larry Karangalan. Faith Broadcasting Network remained with the station, albeit as a late-night block.

In March 2017, veteran Batangas freelance journalist Ron Lozano joined the station, followed by DJ Banjo Valdemor five months later. Lozano left the station in March 2018 to concentrate as a stringer for CNN Philippines and has been an on air talent at 101.5 FM since October 1, 2018.

== Frequency assignment conflicts ==
The station was also beset with frequency assignment conflicts with Calapan-based DWOM in the early 2010s. The latter, broadcasting with a stronger 1 kW output, constantly posed problems to the Padre Garcia station's southern broadcast range on the eastern parts of Batangas City as both signals overlapped. In 2014, Radio City moved to 97.5 FM in 2014, but the former was reactivated as a repeater of its Manila flagship. However, it was shut down a couple of years later.

On January 15, 2017, the station moved to 105.3 FM after years of broadcasting at 105.5 FM. However, on January 29, 2018, the station was forced to return to its former position as 105.3 FM returned on air under the banner The Big 30K, Pakakak ng Bayan (lit. The Town's Trumpet), forcing DWOM to sign-off after sunset.
