= XHPF-FM =

Radio station in Mexicali, Baja California, Mexico

- Mexicali, Baja California; Mexico
- Frequency: 101.9 MHz
- Branding: Globo

Programming
- Format: Romantic

Ownership
- Owner: MVS Radio; (Stereorey México, S.A. de C.V.)
- Sister stations: XHJC-FM, XHVG-FM, XEMX-AM

History
- First air date: February 23, 1976 (concession)
- Former names: fm globo stereo,fm globo
- Former frequencies: 103.3

Technical information
- Licensing authority: CRT
- Class: B1
- ERP: 14.118 kW
- HAAT: 63.1 m (207 ft)
- Transmitter coordinates: 32°38′44.2″N 115°27′1.8″W

Links
- Webcast: Listen live
- Website: www.fmglobo.com/mexicali/

XHPF-FM is a radio station on 101.9 FM in Mexicali, Baja California, Mexico. The station is owned by MVS Radio and carries its Globo romantic format.

== History ==
XHPF received its first concession on February 23, 1976. The original concessionaire was Frecuencia Modulada de Mexicali, S.A.

XHPF had been among the last stations to carry the "FM Globo" name, which was used for decades by MVS. By 2018, just XHPF and XHARE-FM in Ojinaga, Chihuahua, were using it. However, the format has since expanded to stations in Guadalajara (XHLC-FM), Monterrey (XHJM-FM) and Tijuana (XHOCL-FM).
