= XHPECO-FM =

Radio station in Monclova, Coahuila, Mexico

- Monclova, Coahuila; Mexico
- Frequency: 105.5 FM
- Branding: Familiar FM

Programming
- Format: Christian

Ownership
- Owner: Pamela Verenice García Aguirre

History
- First air date: 2019
- Call sign meaning: (templated callsign)

Technical information
- Licensing authority: CRT
- Class: A
- ERP: 3 kW
- HAAT: −65.9 m (−216 ft)

Links
- Website: XHPECO-FM on Facebook

XHPECO-FM is a radio station on 105.5 FM in Monclova, Coahuila. The station is owned by Pamela Verenice García Aguirre and known as Familiar FM with a Christian format.

== History ==
On August 8, 2018, the Federal Telecommunications Institute adjudicated a cluster of pre-2014 applications for permit radio stations in the Monclova–Frontera area. Awarding one social frequency, the IFT granted the application of Pamela Verenice García Aguirre and denied competing bids from Fundación Multimedia, A.C., and Radio Cultural del Centro, A.C. The station signed on in the summer of 2019 with Christian programming.
