= KKRB =

- Klamath Falls, Oregon; United States
- Broadcast area: Klamath Falls, Oregon
- Frequency: 106.9 MHz
- Branding: Sunny 107

Programming
- Format: Adult Contemporary

Ownership
- Owner: Wynne Broadcasting; (Wynne Enterprises LLC)
- Sister stations: KFEG, KFLS, KFLS-FM, KKKJ, KRJW

History
- First air date: 1983
- Former frequencies: 95.9 MHz (1983–1988)

Technical information
- Licensing authority: FCC
- Facility ID: 74251
- Class: C1
- ERP: 51,000 watts
- HAAT: 197 meters (646 feet)
- Transmitter coordinates: 42°13′24″N 121°49′02″W

Links
- Public license information: Public file; LMS
- Webcast: Listen Live
- Website: KKRB Online

KKRB (106.9 FM, "Sunny 107") is a radio station licensed to serve Klamath Falls, Oregon, United States. The station, launched in 1983, is owned by Wynne Broadcasting and the broadcast license is held by Wynne Enterprises LLC.

== Programming ==
KKRB broadcasts a soft adult contemporary music format. Syndicated programming on the station includes The John Tesh Radio Show as both a morning show and an evening program.

== History ==
This station received its original construction permit for a new FM station broadcasting with 3,000 watts of power on a frequency of 95.9 MHz from the Federal Communications Commission on November 30, 1982. The new station was assigned the KKRB call sign by the FCC on February 14, 1983. KKRB received its license to cover from the FCC on December 12, 1983.

The station filed an application with the FCC in July 1984 requesting a change in assigned frequency from 95.9 to 106.9 MHz and an increase in signal power from 3,000 watts to 43,200 watts. The FCC issued a new construction permit authorizing the changes on September 4, 1984. The station received a license to cover these changes on March 18, 1988.

As part of an internal corporate reorganization, Wynne Broadcasting Company, Inc., filed an application in November 2003 to transfer the broadcast license for KKRB to a new company called Wynne Enterprises, LLC. The transfer was approved by the FCC on December 10, 2003, and the transaction was consummated on March 1, 2004.

== Awards and honors ==
KKRB was honored as "Adult Contemporary Radio Station of the Year" by New Music Weekly magazine at its annual New Music Awards in 2006, 2007, and 2008. KKRB program director Randy Adams was also honored as "Adult Contemporary Program Director of the Year" in 2006, 2007, and 2008.
