= KYSF =

- Bonanza, Oregon; United States
- Broadcast area: Klamath Falls-Altamont
- Frequency: 97.5 MHz
- Branding: Air1

Programming
- Format: Christian worship
- Affiliations: Air1

Ownership
- Owner: Educational Media Foundation

History
- First air date: 1999
- Former call signs: KAQX (1996–1999)
- Former frequencies: 102.9 MHz (1999–2015)

Technical information
- Licensing authority: FCC
- Facility ID: 3462
- Class: C3
- ERP: 460 watts directional
- HAAT: 642 meters (2106 feet)
- Transmitter coordinates: 42°05′48″N 121°37′57″W

Links
- Public license information: Public file; LMS
- Webcast: Listen Live
- Website: https://www.air1.com air1.com]

KYSF (97.5 FM, "Air1") is a radio station licensed to Bonanza, Oregon, United States. The station is owned by Educational Media Foundation.

== Programming ==
KYSF broadcasts a Christian Worship music format to the greater Klamath Falls-Altamont, Oregon area. From 2009 to early 2012, almost all programming except syndicated programming heard on KYSF was from Dial Global's Hits NOW! satellite format. Syndicated programming on KYSF included Rick Dees' Weekly Top 40, Kidd Kraddick in the Morning and Baka Boyz Hip-Hop Mastermix.

== History ==
This station received its original construction permit from the FCC on August 9, 1996. The new station was assigned the call letters KAQX by the FCC on October 25, 1996. KAQX received its license to cover from the FCC on February 5, 1999.

The station was assigned the current call sign by the FCC on June 17, 1999.

On January 5, 2012, KYSF changed its format from contemporary hits to EMF's K-Love contemporary Christian format.

On February 11, 2014, KYSF moved from 102.9 FM to 97.5 FM. The station was licensed to operate at 97.5 FM on January 13, 2015. By 2018, KYSF was broadcasting K-Love's sister station feed, Air 1 which flipped formats to Christian Worship in January 2019.
