= KLAD-FM =

- Klamath Falls, Oregon; United States
- Broadcast area: Klamath Falls, Oregon
- Frequency: 92.5 MHz
- Branding: 92.5 KLAD

Programming
- Format: Country

Ownership
- Owner: Basin Meditative LLC
- Sister stations: KAGO, KAGO-FM, KFXX-FM, KHIC, KLAD

History
- First air date: July 19, 1974
- Former call signs: KLAD-FM (1974–1978); KJSN (1978–1986)

Technical information
- Licensing authority: FCC
- Facility ID: 3409
- Class: C
- ERP: 63,000 watts
- HAAT: 653 meters (2,142 ft)
- Transmitter coordinates: 42°05′50″N 121°37′59″W

Links
- Public license information: Public file; LMS
- Webcast: Listen Live
- Website: mybasin.com

KLAD-FM (92.5 FM) is a radio station licensed to serve Klamath Falls, Oregon, United States. The station, established in 1974, is currently owned by Basin Mediactive, LLC.

== Programming ==
KLAD-FM broadcasts a country music format. Syndicated programs include The Big Time with Whitney Allen.

== History ==
This station began regular operations on July 19, 1974, broadcasting with 27,000 watts of effective radiated power on a frequency of 92.5 MHz. The station, launched as a sister station to KLAD (960 AM), was assigned the call sign KLAD-FM by the Federal Communications Commission. KLAD-FM was owned by 960 Radio, Inc., and led by Cyrus L. Smith as company president and general manager with August O. Crandall serving as both program director and music director.

During the day, KLAD-FM operated as a simulcast of KLAD, airing a country & western music mix. By 1978 KLAD-FM had changed its call sign to KJSN but it continued the simulcast.

In February 1986, 960 Radio, Inc., reached an agreement to sell KJSN to Lost River Broadcasting, Inc. The deal was approved by the FCC on March 25, 1986, but the transaction was never consummated and control of KLAD remained with 960 Radio, Inc. The station was reassigned the call sign KLAD-FM by the FCC on December 25, 1986. One week later, AM sister station KLAD dropped that long-held callsign for KLKL.

In March 1988, 960 Radio, Inc., reached a new agreement to sell this station, this time, to Todd Communications, Inc. The deal was approved by the FCC on May 11, 1988, and the transaction was consummated on May 13, 1988. Just under two years later, in February 1990, Todd Communications, Inc., contracted to sell this station to B&B Broadcasting, Inc. The deal was approved by the FCC on April 18, 1990, and the transaction was consummated on June 1, 1990.

In August 1998, B&B Broadcasting, Inc., reached an agreement to sell this station to New Northwest Broadcasters, Inc., as part of a six-station deal valued at $7.9 million. The deal was approved by the FCC on October 20, 1998, and the transaction was consummated on December 10, 1998.

In May 2011, New Northwest Broadcast, LLC, reached an agreement to sell KLAD-FM and four other radio stations to Basin Mediactive, LLC.
