= KHIC =

- Keno, Oregon; United States
- Broadcast area: Klamath Falls, Oregon
- Frequency: 98.5 MHz
- Branding: Big 98.5

Programming
- Format: Top 40 (CHR)

Ownership
- Owner: Basin Mediactive, LLC
- Sister stations: KAGO, KAGO-FM, KFXX-FM, KLAD, KLAD-FM

History
- First air date: April 22, 2014

Technical information
- Licensing authority: FCC
- Facility ID: 190240
- Class: C2
- ERP: 1,800 watts
- HAAT: 653 meters
- Transmitter coordinates: 42°12′56″N 121°47′51″W

Links
- Public license information: Public file; LMS
- Webcast: Listen Live
- Website: mybasin.com

KHIC (98.5 FM, "Big 98.5") is a commercial Top 40/CHR radio station licensed to Klamath Falls, Oregon, United States. The station is currently owned by Basin Mediactive, LLC.

== History ==
The station signed on the air on April 22, 2014. According to General Manager Rob Siems, "We decided to go with a station that plays today’s hit music, because we felt there wasn’t any other station filling that niche in the Klamath Basin." The station serves as an affiliate for "On Air With Ryan Seacrest" and "Zach Sang and the Gang."

The station airs a topical morning show "The Big Morning Show with Scott Hoffman and Nicky Robinson". Another local DJ, Cooper Roberts who is the Sports Director of Basin Mediactive, LLC. hosts the BIG Afternoon Show.
