= KFLS (AM) =

- Klamath Falls, Oregon; United States
- Broadcast area: Klamath Falls, Oregon
- Frequency: 1450 kHz
- Branding: 1450 KFLS

Programming
- Format: News Talk Information
- Affiliations: CNN Radio

Ownership
- Owner: Wynne Broadcasting; (Wynne Enterprises LLC)
- Sister stations: KFEG, KFLS-FM, KKKJ, KKRB, KRJW

History
- First air date: 1946

Technical information
- Licensing authority: FCC
- Facility ID: 74250
- Class: C
- Power: 1,000 watts
- Transmitter coordinates: 42°12′18″N 121°45′35″W
- Translators: K273DF (102.5 MHz, Klamath Falls)

Links
- Public license information: Public file; LMS
- Webcast: Listen Live
- Website: KFLS website

KFLS (1450 AM) is a radio station broadcasting a News Talk Information format. Licensed to Klamath Falls, Oregon, United States, the station is currently owned and operated by Wynne Enterprises, LLC, and features programming from CNN Radio. The program and sports director is Randy Adams.

== News talk programming ==
KFLS currently features news talk programs from such personalities as Lars Larson, Tom Sullivan, Ben Shapiro.

== Sports programming ==
They were a partial affiliate of ESPN Radio until rival station KLAD acquired full-time affiliation in February 2014. Became the sports station of the University of Oregon Ducks and Portland Trail Blazers.
