= XHJC-FM =

Exa FM station in Mexicali, Baja California, Mexico

- Mexicali, Baja California; Mexico
- Frequency: 91.5 MHz
- Branding: Exa FM

Programming
- Format: Contemporary hit radio

Ownership
- Owner: MVS Radio; (Stereorey México, S.A.)
- Sister stations: XEMX-AM, XHPF-FM, XHVG-FM

History
- First air date: 1980
- Call sign meaning: José de Jesús Cortés y Barbosa (original concessionaire)

Technical information
- Licensing authority: CRT
- Class: B1
- ERP: 14.568 kW
- HAAT: 43.1 m (141 ft)

Links
- Webcast: Listen live
- Website: exafm.com

XHJC-FM is a radio station in Mexicali, Baja California, Mexico. Broadcasting on 91.5 FM, XHJC carries the Exa FM national format from MVS Radio.

== History ==
The station's concession was awarded in 1980 to José de Jesús Cortés y Barbosa. The first concept launched was Fórmula Melódica, also known as "Musicali". This lasted a year before the station relaunched with a pop music format under the name Sonido 91.

In the 1990s, the station was sold by Sociedad Mexicana de Radio de Baja California to MVS Radio; XHJC retained pop but adopted Pulsar FM, then a brand shared by MVS and Grupo Imagen. When the two broke up, MVS launched Exa FM in 2000.

The concession was transferred in 2012.
