= XHAKUM-FM =

Radio station in Akumal, Quintana Roo, Mexico

Akumal, Quintana Roo; Mexico
- Frequency: 105.5 FM
- Branding: Maya FM

Programming
- Format: Spanish classic hits

Ownership
- Owner: Enlace Social Akumal, A.C.
- Operator: Grupo Origen

History
- First air date: 2018
- Call sign meaning: AKUMal

Technical information
- Class: A

Links
- Webcast: Listen live
- Website: grupoorigen.com.mx

XHAKUM-FM is a radio station on 105.5 FM in Akumal, Quintana Roo, Mexico.

== History ==
On November 30, 2015, Enlace Social Akumal applied for the 105.5 social frequency at Akumal that the Federal Telecommunications Institute (IFT) had made available in its 2015 FM station program. The IFT awarded the concession on January 31, 2018. Funding for the station would be provided by Administradora de Conjuntos Hoteleros, which operates the Akumal Bay (formerly Akumal Beach) resort.

XHAKUM went on the air September 3, 2018, along with Acustik 95.3, which had been off the air for two weeks. In January 2019, all Acustik operations in Quintana Roo changed to the name Origen, including the radio station in Cancún and the simulcasting station in Akumal.

It currently has the Maya FM format.
