= Klamath County Event Center =

Multipurpose arena in Klamath Falls, Oregon

Coordinates: 42.20856°N 121.744566°W

The Klamath County Event Center is an arena located in Klamath Falls, Oregon, as part of the Klamath County Fairgrounds.

The area contains an arena floor, which is 24,000 square feet. It has a fridge, freezer, and an oven, which could be used for cooking.

The Klamath County Fairgrounds also includes an exhibit hall, an indoor arena & outdoor arena, two livestock barns, horse stalls, an outdoor stage, showers, and an RV park.
