= KFEG =

- Klamath Falls, Oregon; United States
- Broadcast area: Klamath Falls, Oregon
- Frequency: 104.7 MHz
- Branding: 104.7 The Eagle

Programming
- Format: Classic rock

Ownership
- Owner: Wynne Broadcasting; (Cove Road Publishing LCC)
- Sister stations: KFLS, KFLS-FM, KKRB, KKKJ, KRJW

History
- First air date: 2002
- Call sign meaning: K FM EaGle

Technical information
- Licensing authority: FCC
- Facility ID: 77829
- Class: C1
- ERP: 51,000 watts
- HAAT: 196.7 meters (645 ft)
- Transmitter coordinates: 42°13′24″N 121°49′2″W

Links
- Public license information: Public file; LMS
- Webcast: Listen Live
- Website: KFEG Online

KFEG (104.7 FM, "104.7 The Eagle") is a radio station broadcasting a classic rock music format. It is licensed to Klamath Falls, Oregon, United States. The station is currently owned by Wynne Broadcasting, LLC, and licensed to Cove Road Publishing, LLC.

== History ==
The Federal Communications Commission issued a construction permit for the station to Klamath Basin Broadcasting on April 20, 2000. The station was issued the KFEG call sign on May 12, 2000. On January 2, 2001, the station's permit was transferred by Klamath Basin to the current owners, Cove Road Publishing. The station received its license to cover on June 17, 2002.
