= KAGO-FM =

- Altamont, Oregon; United States
- Broadcast area: Klamath Falls, Oregon
- Frequency: 94.9 MHz
- Branding: The Rock at 94.9

Programming
- Format: Mainstream rock

Ownership
- Owner: Basin Mediactive, LLC
- Sister stations: KAGO, KFXX-FM, KHIC, KLAD, KLAD-FM

History
- First air date: May 10, 2017
- Former call signs: KFXX-FM (Jul 2016-May 2017)

Technical information
- Licensing authority: FCC
- Facility ID: 198620
- Class: C2
- ERP: 1,800 watts
- HAAT: 653 meters (2,142 ft)
- Transmitter coordinates: 42°5′49.5″N 121°38′2.9″W
- Translators: 93.3 K227CU (Klamath Falls, etc.)

Links
- Public license information: Public file; LMS
- Webcast: Listen live
- Website: www.mybasin.com

KAGO-FM (94.9 FM, "The Rock at 94.9") is a radio station licensed to Altamont, Oregon and serves Klamath Falls. It broadcasts a mainstream rock format and its broadcast license is held by Basin Mediactive.

== History ==
This station received its original construction permit from the Federal Communications Commission on November 4, 2015. The new station was assigned the KFXX-FM call sign by the FCC on July 15, 2016. On May 10, 2017, the station was assigned the call sign KAGO-FM, which was held by its sister station on 99.5 FM. At the same time, the rock format on 99.5 FM, "99.5 The Rock," moved to 94.9 FM and became "The Rock at 94.9." KAGO-FM received its license to cover from the FCC on June 14, 2017.
