= DWDR =

Philippine radio station

DPR Radio (DWDR)
- Sorsogon City; Philippines
- Broadcast area: Sorsogon and surrounding areas
- Frequency: 105.5 MHz
- Branding: DPR Radio 105.5

Programming
- Languages: Bicolano, Filipino
- Format: Community radio

Ownership
- Owner: Sorsogon Provincial Disaster Risk Reduction and Management Office

History
- Call sign meaning: Disaster Risk

Technical information
- Licensing authority: NTC
- Class: C, D, E
- Power: 1,000 watts

Links
- Website: http://dprradio.spdrrmo.org.ph/

DWDR (105.5 FM), broadcasting as DPR Radio 105.5, is a radio station owned and operated by the Sorsogon Provincial Disaster Risk Reduction and Management Office. Its studios and transmitter are located at Flores St., Capitol Compound, Brgy. Burabod, Sorsogon City.
