= WFCT =

- Apalachicola, Florida; United States
- Broadcast area: Panama City area
- Frequency: 105.5 MHz
- Branding: The Coast 105.5

Programming
- Format: Adult contemporary
- Affiliations: FOX News Radio, Gulf State News Network

Ownership
- Owner: Williams Communications, Inc.
- Sister stations: WHMA-FM, WHMA-AM, WKLS

History
- First air date: 1996-03-15 (as WXGJ)
- Former call signs: WXGJ (1996–2001)
- Call sign meaning: W Florida CoasT

Technical information
- Licensing authority: FCC
- Facility ID: 76260
- Class: C2
- ERP: 50,000 watts
- HAAT: 96 meters
- Transmitter coordinates: 29°45′5.00″N 84°52′19.00″W

Links
- Public license information: Public file; LMS

WFCT (105.5 FM) is a radio station broadcasting an adult contemporary format, playing songs from the 1960s - early 2000s. Licensed to Apalachicola, Florida, United States, the station serves the Panama City area. The station is currently owned by Williams Communications, Inc. In October 2018, after being knocked off the air during Hurricane Michael, WFCT began offering news updates twice an hour. WFCT is voiced by actress Susan Mazel.

== History ==
The station went on the air as WXGJ on 1996-03-15. on 2001-04-20, the station changed its call sign to the current WFCT.
