= KFLS-FM =

- Tulelake, California; United States
- Broadcast area: Klamath Falls, Oregon
- Frequency: 96.5 MHz
- Branding: Kix 96

Programming
- Format: Country

Ownership
- Owner: Wynne Broadcasting; (Wynne Enterprises LLC)
- Sister stations: KFEG, KFLS, KKKJ, KKRB, KRJW

History
- First air date: 1993

Technical information
- Licensing authority: FCC
- Facility ID: 74252
- Class: C
- ERP: 20,000 watts
- HAAT: 657 meters (2,156 ft)
- Transmitter coordinates: 42°5′50″N 121°37′59″W

Links
- Public license information: Public file; LMS
- Webcast: Listen live
- Website: klamathradio.com/KIX96

KFLS-FM (96.5 FM) is a radio station broadcasting a country music format. Licensed to Tulelake, California, United States, the station is currently owned by Wynne Enterprises LLC.
