= XHHE-FM =

Radio station in Atotonilco El Alto, Jalisco, Mexico

- Atotonilco, Jalisco; Mexico
- Frequency: 105.5 FM
- Branding: La Z

Programming
- Format: Regional Mexican
- Affiliations: Grupo Radio Centro

Ownership
- Owner: Miguel Ochoa Beltrán

History
- First air date: June 29, 1959 (concession)

Technical information
- Class: CRT
- Power: AA
- ERP: 6 kW
- HAAT: 95.41 m (313.0 ft)
- Transmitter coordinates: 20°33′47″N 102°31′14″W

Links
- Webcast: Listen live

XHHE-FM is a radio station on 105.5 FM in Atotonilco, Jalisco. It is owned by Miguel Ochoa Beltrán and affiliated with Grupo Radio Centro, and carries a Regional Mexican format known as La Z.

== History ==
XEHE-AM 1460, a 250-watt daytimer, received its concession on June 29, 1959. In the 1990s, it was moved to 940 kHz and increased power to 1,000 watts. It migrated to FM in 2011.
