= KDDK =

KDDK-FM
- Addis, Louisiana; United States
- Broadcast area: Baton Rouge metropolitan area
- Frequency: 105.5 MHz
- Branding: Latin 105.5 Baton Rouge

Programming
- Language: Spanish
- Format: Contemporary hit radio

Ownership
- Owner: Radio & Investments, Inc.

History
- Former call signs: KFRA-FM (–1985); KFMV (1985–2004)

Technical information
- Licensing authority: FCC
- Facility ID: 22310
- Class: A
- ERP: 6,000 watts
- HAAT: 100.0 meters
- Transmitter coordinates: 30°19′25″N 91°16′52″W

Links
- Public license information: Public file; LMS
- Webcast: Listen Live
- Website: www.kddkfm.com

KDDK (105.5 FM) is an American commercial radio station broadcasting a Spanish Hits format. Licensed to Addis, Louisiana, the station serves the Baton Rouge area. As of January 2009, the station is owned by Radio & Investments, Inc.

Music Programming includes Regional Mexican, Salsa, Latin Pop, Reggaeton, Bachata, and Latin Oldies.

== History ==
The station went on the air as KFRA-FM in Franklin, Louisiana. On February 6, 1985, the station changed its call sign to KFMV, on September 28, 2004 to the current KDDK. In April 2008 the station changed its format from variety to Spanish and became the frequency in Baton Rouge for a Spanish radio station located in New Orleans LA. The station moved from Franklin, Louisiana to its current location in Addis, Louisiana in 2007, after being granted permission to do so by the FCC in 2006.
