= KKKJ =

- Merrill, Oregon; United States
- Broadcast area: Klamath Falls, Oregon
- Frequency: 105.5 MHz
- Branding: 3KJ Jammin 105.5

Programming
- Format: Contemporary hit radio

Ownership
- Owner: Wynne Broadcasting Company, Inc.; (Cove Road Publishing, LLC)
- Sister stations: KFEG, KFLS, KFLS-FM, KKRB, KRJW

History
- First air date: 2008

Technical information
- Licensing authority: FCC
- Facility ID: 78319
- Class: C2
- ERP: 18,000 watts
- HAAT: 209 meters (686 ft)
- Transmitter coordinates: 42°13′24″N 121°49′2″W

Links
- Public license information: Public file; LMS

KKKJ (105.5 FM, "3KJ Jammin 105.5") is a radio station broadcasting a contemporary hit radio music format. Licensed to Merrill, Oregon, United States, the station is currently owned by Wynne Broadcasting Company, Inc. through its licensee Cove Road Publishing, LLC.
