= KAGO (AM) =

- Klamath Falls, Oregon; United States
- Frequency: 1150 kHz
- Branding: NewsTalk 92.9 & 1150

Programming
- Format: News Talk Information
- Affiliations: Fox News Radio; Compass Media Networks; Premiere Networks; Salem Radio Network; Westwood One

Ownership
- Owner: Basin Mediactive, LLC (formerly New Northwest Broadcasters, LLC)
- Sister stations: KAGO-FM, KFXX-FM, KHIC, KLAD, KLAD-FM

History
- First air date: 1923

Technical information
- Licensing authority: FCC
- Facility ID: 23245
- Class: D
- Power: 5,000 watts day 52 watts night
- Transmitter coordinates: 42°12′55.8″N 121°47′54.7″W
- Translator: 92.9 K225CW (Klamath Falls)

Links
- Public license information: Public file; LMS
- Website: mybasin.com

KAGO (1150 AM) is a radio station broadcasting a News Talk Information format. Licensed to Klamath Falls, Oregon, United States. The station is currently owned by Basin Mediactive, LLC, and features programming from Fox News Radio, Compass Media Networks, Premiere Networks, Salem Radio Network, and Westwood One.

KAGO signed on in 1923 on 1220 kHz as KFJI. In 1927 it moved to 1200 kHz. As a result of the 1928 reallocations it moved to 1370 kHz. It moved to 1210 kHz in 1932 then to 1240 kHz in 1941 as a result of the NARBA agreement. It moved to 1150 kHz in 1950.
