= KLHB =

- Portland, Texas; United States
- Broadcast area: Corpus Christi metropolitan area
- Frequency: 105.5 MHz
- Branding: Wild 105.5

Programming
- Format: Top 40 (CHR)

Ownership
- Owner: Starlite Broadcasting; (Starlite Broadcasting)
- Sister stations: KLTG

History
- First air date: December 15, 1979 (as KITE)
- Former call signs: KITE (1979–1987); KJKC (1987–1992); KQTX (1992–1993); KZRK (1993–1994); KRAD (1994–2001); KMJR (2001–2010)

Technical information
- Licensing authority: FCC
- Facility ID: 12170
- Class: A
- ERP: 3,000 watts
- HAAT: 90 meters (300 ft)
- Transmitter coordinates: 27°47′48″N 97°23′51″W

Links
- Public license information: Public file; LMS
- Webcast: Listen Live
- Website: wild105cc.com

KLHB (105.5 FM) is a commercial radio station licensed to Portland, Texas, and serving the Corpus Christi metropolitan area. The station airs a Top 40 (CHR) through licensee Starlite Broadcasting. Its studios are located in the Six Points district south of downtown Corpus Christi and the transmitter is in downtown atop the Wells Fargo building.

== History ==
On December 15, 1979, the station first signed on as KITE. In 1987, the station became Top 40 outlet KJKC. It went through several changes in ownership and call signs until 2004 when it was acquired by Tejas Broadcasting. Tejas at first installed a Regional Mexican format on the station, which later became Spanish-language Top 40.

On August 31, 2015, KLHB switched to an all sports format, calling itself "105.5 The Zone" and carrying ESPN Radio programming. It became an ESPN network affiliate after 1440 KEYS gave up its ESPN affiliation, switching from sports to talk radio.

On August 1, 2017, the station began stunting in anticipation of a new format. On August 7, KLHB debuted a mainstream top 40 format called "Wild 105.5", but quickly segued to rhythmic top 40 one week later.

On September 27, 2024, KLHB shifted its format from rhythmic contemporary to Top 40/CHR.
