= KPMW =

Coordinates: 20.741°N 156.308°W

- Haliimaile, Hawaii; United States
- Broadcast area: Maui, HI (United States)
- Frequency: 105.5 (MHz)
- Branding: Mix 105.5

Programming
- Language: Filipino
- Format: Contemporary hit radio, OPM, P-Pop

Ownership
- Owner: Rey-Cel Broadcasting, Inc.

History
- First air date: 1991
- Call sign meaning: MW=Maui

Technical information
- Licensing authority: FCC
- Class: C3
- ERP: 21,000 watts
- HAAT: 165 meters

Links
- Public license information: Public file; LMS
- Website: kpmwmaui.com

KPMW, also known as Mix 105.5, is an ethnic/Filipino radio station serving the Maui, Hawaii, United States, area. The station, which is owned by Rey-Cel Broadcasting, Inc. and whose COL is Haliimaile, HI, broadcasts at 105.5 MHz with an ERP of 9 KW. Streaming online at www.kpmwmaui.com

On January 1, 2013, Wild 105.5 changed the brand to the new "Mix 105.5" Maui's Pinoy Hit Music Station. Playing Filipino Music (OPM), Local/Filipino News and Entertainment. Broadcasting 24/7 in Ilocano, Tagalog, and English from Maui, Hawaii, U.S.A.
