= KRVR =

Coordinates: 37.949°N 120.705°W

- Copperopolis, California; United States
- Broadcast area: Modesto/Stockton, California
- Frequency: 105.5 MHz
- Branding: 105.5 The River

Programming
- Format: Classic hits

Ownership
- Owner: Threshold Communications

History
- First air date: January 1, 1995
- Call sign meaning: K RiVeR

Technical information
- Licensing authority: FCC
- Facility ID: 67043
- Class: A
- ERP: 1,000 watts
- HAAT: 238 meters (781 ft)

Links
- Public license information: Public file; LMS
- Webcast: Listen Live
- Website: krvr.com

KRVR (105.5 MHz) is a commercial FM radio station licensed to Copperopolis, California, and serving the Modesto and Stockton radio markets. Its studios and offices are on North Emerald Avenue in Modesto. The transmitter is on Route 4 between Copperopolis and Telegraph City, on a ridge 1600 feet above the Central Valley.

KRVR airs a classic hits radio format branded as "The River". The station's name refers to several rivers in the broadcast area: San Joaquin, Sacramento, Stanislaus and Tuolumne. KRVR is the Modesto area's only locally owned radio station.

== History ==
KRVR was the first radio station licensed to Calaveras County when it signed on in 1995. Threshold Communications was awarded the license for KRVR in one of the last "comparative hearings" at the [FCC]. The River aired a Smooth Jazz format in its early years, and it received the "Smooth Jazz Station of The Year" award from Radio & Records magazine in 2006.

In March 2011, KRVR changed format to Adult Hits, and one year later fine tuned the format to Classic Hits of the 1960s, 1970s and 1980s, although with a broader playlist than similar stations. The two principals of Threshold Communications each takes a weekend DJ shift, and perform duties as General Manager, Program Director & Music Director of KRVR.

In early 2018, The River began airing a syndicated program entitled "The Beatles Years," which airs Sunday afternoons from 4 to 5 pm. That summer, KRVR started adding a little early 1990s music, but kept playing songs from the 1960s, 1970s, and 1980s. By the 2020s, a little more 1990s music was added to The River's playlist.

== Previous logo ==
(KRVR's logo under previous smooth jazz format)

== Callsign history ==
The KRVR call sign was previously used at 106.5 in Davenport, Iowa.
