= KSNX =

Radio station in Heber, Arizona

Coordinates: 34.462°N 110.403°W

- Heber, Arizona; United States
- Broadcast area: White Mountains (Arizona)
- Frequency: 105.5 MHz
- Branding: KSNX 105.5 FM

Programming
- Format: Classic hits

Ownership
- Owner: Henry A. Ash; (Petracom of Holbrook, LLC)

History
- First air date: 2010
- Call sign meaning: S N = "Sun" (Station was previously a country music station, called "Sun Country")

Technical information
- Licensing authority: FCC
- Facility ID: 171019
- Class: C1
- ERP: 100,000 watts
- HAAT: 125 meters (410 ft)

Links
- Public license information: Public file; LMS
- Website: 1055ksnx.com

KSNX (105.5 FM) is a commercial classic hits music radio station in Heber, Arizona in the United States. It is owned by Henry A. Ash, through licensee Petracom of Holbrook, LLC.
