= KLAD (AM) =

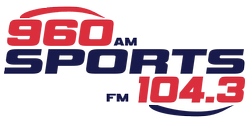
- Klamath Falls, Oregon; United States
- Frequency: 960 kHz
- Branding: ESPN Sports 960 AM FM 104.3

Programming
- Format: Sports
- Affiliations: ESPN Radio

Ownership
- Owner: Basin Mediactive, LLC
- Sister stations: KAGO, KAGO-FM, KFXX-FM, KHIC, KLAD-FM

History
- First air date: September 7, 1955
- Former call signs: KLAD (1955–1987, 1988–2000); KLKL (1987–1988); KKJX (2000–2007)
- Former frequencies: 900 kHz (1955–1959)

Technical information
- Licensing authority: FCC
- Facility ID: 3408
- Class: D
- Power: 5,000 watts (day); 26 watts (night)
- Transmitter coordinates: 42°09′46″N 121°39′6″W
- Translator: 104.3 K282CB (Klamath Falls)

Links
- Public license information: Public file; LMS
- Webcast: Listen live
- Website: mybasin.com

KLAD (960 AM, "ESPN 960 & 104.3") is a radio station licensed to Klamath Falls, Oregon, United States. The station, which began broadcasting in 1955, is currently owned by Basin Mediactive, LLC. KLAD broadcasts a sports format with some programming sourced from ESPN Radio.

== History ==
=== Launch on 900 ===
This station launched on September 7, 1955, broadcasting on a frequency of 900 kHz with 1,000 watts of power, daytime-only, as KLAD. Original licensee K-Lad Broadcasters was co-owned by C.E. Wilson, Phil Jackson, and Bill Hansen.

=== Move to 960 ===
The station was sold to the similarly named KLAD Broadcasters in a transaction that was consummated on April 7, 1958. In 1959, the station moved to the current 960 kHz frequency and upgraded to 5,000 watts of power although it was still restricted to daytime-only operation. KLAD was acquired by Ogden Knapp, who also began serving as president and general manager of the station, on April 3, 1961.

Control of KLAD was passed to 960 Radio, Inc., owned by Cyrus L. Smith and his family, on August 1, 1969. In late 1971, the FCC granted the station a construction permit to add nighttime service at 5,000 watts of power, albeit using a directional antenna array to prevent interference with other stations. KLAD broadcast a country & western music format throughout the 1970s.

=== The 1980s ===
In February 1986, 960 Radio, Inc. reached an agreement to sell this station to Lost River Broadcasting, Inc. The deal was approved by the FCC on March 25, 1986, but the transaction was never consummated and control of KLAD remained with 960 Radio, Inc. On January 1, 1987, the station dropped its original KLAD call sign for KLKL.

Just over a year later, on March 3, 1988, the station returned to its original KLAD call sign. A few weeks later in March 1988, 960 Radio, Inc., reached a new agreement to sell this station, this time, to Todd Communications, Inc. The deal was approved by the FCC on May 11, 1988, and the transaction was consummated on May 13, 1988.

=== The 1990s ===
KKJX La Maquina Musical logo

In February 1990, Todd Communications, Inc., reached an agreement to sell this station to B&B Broadcasting, Inc. The deal was approved by the FCC on April 18, 1990, and the transaction was consummated on June 1, 1990.

In August 1998, B&B Broadcasting, Inc., reached an agreement to sell this station to New Northwest Broadcasters, Inc., as part of a six-station deal valued at $7.9 million. The deal was approved by the FCC on October 20, 1998, and the transaction was consummated on December 10, 1998. The station applied for a new callsign and the FCC assigned it KKJX on January 12, 2000. KKJX began broadcasting a sports talk format branded as "ESPN 960" in that carried nothing by ESPN Radio programming. This proved short-lived as in February 2001, KKJX flipped formats to broadcast a Spanish-language syndicated music format known as "La Maquina Musical".

=== Through 2011 ===
Country branding

As part of an internal corporate reorganization, New Northwest Broadcasters, Inc., applied to the FCC to transfer the broadcast license for KLAD to New Northwest Broadcasters, LLC. The transfer was approved by the FCC on June 22, 2000, and the transaction was consummated on July 31, 2000.

The station was most recently reassigned the heritage KLAD call sign by the FCC on June 20, 2007. With the return to KLAD, the station also returned to its heritage country music format playing nothing but classic country.

New Northwest Broadcasters encountered financial difficulties and in May 2010 the station group was forced into receivership by order of the Superior Court for King County, Washington. More than 30 broadcast licenses were transferred to Revitalization Partners, LLC, acting as general receivers. After overcoming certain legal objections by creditors, a number of the stations were sold to new owners. KLAD plus sister stations KAGO, KAGO-FM, KLAD-FM, and KYSF were sold to Basin Mediactive, LLC, in February 2011. The sale gained FCC approval on April 7, 2011, and the transaction was formally consummated on May 1, 2011.

=== Return to sports ===
Sports Legend branding

On August 15, 2011, "Country Legends 960" changed formats to "960 the Sports Legend" becoming the Klamath Basin's only all-sports station. "960 the Sports Legend" featured national sports talk hosts Dan Patrick and Jim Rome. Local sports personality Ryan Goff, with more than a decade of Oregon sports experience, provides local play-by-play broadcasts, weekday local & regional sports updates, and a local sports talk show. Goff moved away in late 2013. Leaving the reins to Matthew Bagley. Matthew continues the traditions of Goff with the "Les Schwab Tires/ Bi-Mart Game of the Week" For high school football. Bagley also airs Klamath Union Basketball and Baseball. In early 2014 the station added another play-by-play broadcaster, Cooper Roberts. He is now the "Voice of Klamath Union High School". Broadcasting all Klamath Union Football, Basketball, and Baseball competitions. Matthew left KLAD in 2016. Mike Spataro was promoted to Sports Director and served for a few months before moving back to Colorado to be closer to family. In November 2016, Cooper was promoted to Sports Director where he currently serves.

KLAD exclusively airs live broadcasts of the Oregon State Beavers football, Oregon Tech Lady Owls basketball, Seattle Seahawks, NFL football including the Super Bowl, and Klamath Falls Gems baseball in addition to Klamath Union Athletics KLAD is unmatched in local & regional sports coverage. In total, over 200 play-by-play broadcasts are scheduled each year.

In late 2013, KLAD added an FM Feed to accompany the AM 960 Feed on 93.3FM. In February 2014 KLAD switched affiliations from Fox Sports Radio to ESPN Radio and rebranded as "ESPN 960".

In the summer of 2015, the station, along with its sister station "News Talk 1150 KAGO AM" carried the 16-18 year old Babe Ruth World Series that was held at Kiger Stadium. Matthew Bagley, along with Cooper Roberts, Mike Garrard, and Bobby Thompson. And other area broadcasters teamed up to bring every game to the radio. The World Series will return to Klamath Falls in 2017.

KLAD began carrying "The Bald Faced Truth" with John Canzano from 12-3p, a syndicated sports show that originated in Portland, OR, in 2017. Canzano is the sports columnist at The Oregonian.
