= KACT (AM) =

Radio station in Andrews, Texas

Andrews, Texas; United States
- Frequency: 1360 kHz

Programming
- Format: News/Talk
- Affiliations: Westwood One

Ownership
- Owner: Andrews Broadcasting Company Inc., Jessica May Reid, President; (Andrews Broadcasting Company Inc.,)
- Sister stations: KACT-FM

History
- First air date: December 4, 1954 (first license granted)

Technical information
- Licensing authority: FCC
- Facility ID: 74562
- Class: B
- Power: 1,000 watts day 240 watts night
- Transmitter coordinates: 32°20′50.00″N 102°33′23.00″W

Links
- Public license information: Public file; LMS
- Website: kactradio.com

KACT (1360 AM) is a radio station broadcasting a News/Talk format. Licensed to Andrews, Texas, United States, the station is currently owned by licensee, Andrews Broadcasting Company Inc., Jessica May Reid, President, Gerald K. Reid, is Station Manager. The station features News/Talk, Radio Programs, from various networks.

KACT also airs local Andrews Lady Mustang Sports, and Texas A&M Aggie Football.

KACT went on the air, December 4, 1954. Put on the air by Joe Young and Archie Holman.
