= WKPL =

Radio station in Pennington Gap, Virginia

- Pennington Gap, Virginia; United States
- Broadcast area: Pennington Gap, Virginia; Big Stone Gap, Virginia; Jonesville, Virginia
- Frequency: 105.5 MHz

Programming
- Format: Contemporary Christian
- Network: K-Love

Ownership
- Owner: Educational Media Foundation

History
- First air date: 1973
- Former call signs: WSWV-FM (1973–2024); WLGY (2024–2026)

Technical information
- Licensing authority: FCC
- Facility ID: 36894
- Class: A
- Power: 6,000 watts
- HAAT: 84 meters (276 ft)
- Transmitter coordinates: 36°44′2″N 83°2′34″W

Links
- Public license information: Public file; LMS

WKPL is a contemporary Christian-formatted broadcast radio station licensed to Pennington Gap, Virginia, serving the Pennington Gap/Big Stone Gap/Jonesville area. WKPL is owned by the Educational Media Foundation.
