= WWWK =

Radio station in Islamorada, Florida

- Islamorada, Florida; United States
- Broadcast area: Florida Keys area
- Frequency: 105.5 FM
- Branding: El Patron 105.5 FM

Programming
- Format: Regional Mexican
- Affiliations: Univision Radio And Uforia Network

Ownership
- Owner: South Florida Radio Group

History
- Former call signs: WPLC (1984–1986); WAVK (1986–2003)

Technical information
- Licensing authority: FCC
- Facility ID: 34355
- Class: C2
- ERP: 50,000 watts
- HAAT: 131 meters (430 ft)

Links
- Public license information: Public file; LMS
- Webcast: http://stream.zeno.fm/1ut849x2nhruv
- Website: https://elpatron1055fm.com/

WWWK (105.5 FM) is a radio station licensed to Islamorada, Florida, United States. The station is currently owned by Lsm Radio Partners LLC.

== History ==
The station was assigned the call letters WPLC on March 2, 1984. On December 1, 1986, the station changed its call sign to WAVK then on October 23, 2003, to the current WWWK.

== See also ==
- Rumbera Network in Venezuela (Spanish)
