= KXCS =

- Coahoma, Texas; United States
- Broadcast area: Big Spring-Snyder
- Frequency: 105.5 MHz
- Branding: 105.5 The X

Programming
- Format: Classic rock

Ownership
- Owner: Weeks Broadcasting, Inc.

History
- First air date: 2006 (as KWDC)
- Former call signs: KWDC (2006–2010)

Technical information
- Licensing authority: FCC
- Facility ID: 164310
- Class: A
- ERP: 5,100 watts
- HAAT: 109.0 meters (357.6 ft)
- Transmitter coordinates: 32°21′52.00″N 101°19′35.00″W

Links
- Public license information: Public file; LMS
- Website: kbygradio.com

KXCS (105.5 FM) is a radio station licensed to Coahoma, Texas, United States, serving the Big Spring-Snyder area. The station is currently owned by Weeks Broadcasting, Inc.

There was an earlier authorization for 105.5 at Coahoma called KBYG-FM and assigned to Drew Ballard, owner of KBYG Big Spring. The station was never constructed or put on air owing to an economic downturn at the time.
