= KACT-FM =

Radio station in Andrews, Texas

- Andrews, Texas; United States
- Broadcast area: Odessa-Midland area
- Frequency: 105.5 MHz

Programming
- Format: Country music
- Affiliations: Westwood One

Ownership
- Owner: Andrews Broadcasting Company Inc.
- Sister stations: KACT

History
- First air date: 1978

Technical information
- Licensing authority: FCC
- Facility ID: 74560
- Class: A
- ERP: 6,000 watts
- HAAT: 64.0 meters (210.0 ft)
- Transmitter coordinates: 32°20′50.00″N 102°33′23.00″W

Links
- Public license information: Public file; LMS

KACT-FM (105.5 FM) is a radio station broadcasting a country music format. Licensed to Andrews, Texas, United States, the station serves the Odessa-Midland area. The station is currently owned by Andrews Broadcasting Company Inc., Jessica May Reid, President. Gerald K. Reid, is Station Manager. Andrews Broadcasting Co., Inc., purchased the station, along with its sister station, KACT AM, from Zia Broadcasting Company, effective September 1, 2021, and features programming from Westwood One.
