= XHCMS-FM =

Imagen Radio station in Mexicali, Baja California, Mexico

- Mexicali, Baja California; Mexico
- Frequency: 105.5 FM
- Branding: Imagen Radio

Programming
- Format: News/talk

Ownership
- Owner: Grupo Imagen; (GIM Televisión Nacional, S.A. de C.V.)
- Sister stations: XHCTME-TDT

History
- First air date: February 16, 1994 (concession)
- Call sign meaning: Original station location of Ciudad Morelos

Technical information
- Licensing authority: CRT
- Class: B1
- ERP: 30,000 watts
- HAAT: 43.6 m (143 ft)

Links
- Webcast: Listen live
- Website: imagenmexicali.mx

XHCMS-FM is a radio station on 105.5 FM in Mexicali, Baja California, Mexico. The station is owned by Grupo Imagen and carries its Imagen Radio news/talk format.

== History ==
XHCMS received its first concession on March 30, 1994. It was owned by Carlos Armando Madrazo y Pintado and located in Ciudad Morelos. MVS Radio, which bought all of Madrazo y Pintado's stations, would sell XHCMS to Imagen in 2004.
