= WDBA-LP =

- Farmingdale, New York; United States
- Frequency: 105.5 MHz

Programming
- Language: Spanish
- Format: Christian radio

Ownership
- Owner: Fuente de Luz Radio, Inc.

History
- First air date: February 3, 2016

Technical information
- Licensing authority: FCC
- Facility ID: 192931
- Class: L1
- ERP: 6 watts
- HAAT: 124 meters (407 ft)
- Transmitter coordinates: 40°47′44″N 73°27′42″W

Links
- Public license information: LMS

WDBA-LP (105.5 FM) is a low-power FM radio station broadcasting a Spanish Christian radio format. Licensed to Farmingdale, New York, the station is currently owned by Fuente de Luz Radio, Inc.

== History ==
This station received its original construction permit from the Federal Communications Commission on October 21, 2014, with a scheduled expiration of April 21, 2016. The new station was assigned the WDBA-LP call sign by the FCC on October 28, 2014 and received its license to cover from the FCC on February 3, 2016.

Initially, the station broadcast a country format as "The Hawk," but wasn't able to get enough underwriters to sustain it. In late 2016, they switched over to Spanish Christian, and made the country format online only.
