= DWOM-FM =

DWOM
- Calapan; Philippines
- Broadcast area: Northern Mindoro, parts of Batangas
- Frequency: 105.5 MHz
- Branding: DWOM 105.5

Programming
- Language: Filipino
- Format: Community radio

Ownership
- Owner: Kaissar Broadcasting Network

History
- First air date: August 14, 1969 (on AM); March 6, 1998 (on FM)
- Former call signs: DZOM (1969–1998)
- Former frequencies: 1107 kHz (1969–1998)
- Call sign meaning: Oriental Mindoro

Technical information
- Licensing authority: NTC
- Power: 1 kW

DWOM (105.5 FM) is a radio station in the Philippines owned and operated by Kaissar Broadcasting Network. Its studios and transmitter are located at Sitio Bonbon, Brgy. Salong, Calapan.

== History ==
Established on August 14, 1969, on 1107 kHz under the call letters DZOM, it was the pioneer station in the province. At that time, it was owned by Oriental Mindoro Management Resources Corporation, and was located at the 3rd Floor, Cacha Bldg., Del Pilar St., Brgy. Nacoco. On March 6, 1998, the station was acquired by Kaissar Broadcasting Network, and migrated to FM on 105.5 MHz, under the call letters DWOM. At that time, it relocated to its present home in Sitio Bonbon, Brgy. Salong.
