= KFXX-FM =

- Klamath Falls, Oregon; United States
- Broadcast area: Klamath Falls, Oregon
- Frequency: 99.5 MHz
- Branding: 99.5 The Fox

Programming
- Format: Classic hits
- Affiliations: Westwood One

Ownership
- Owner: Basin Mediactive, LLC
- Sister stations: KAGO; KAGO-FM; KHIC; KLAD; KLAD-FM

History
- First air date: October 15, 1973 (as KAGM at 98.5)
- Former call signs: KAGM (1973–1980); KAGO-FM (1980–2017)
- Former frequencies: 98.5 MHz (1973–1981)

Technical information
- Licensing authority: FCC
- Facility ID: 23246
- Class: C1
- ERP: 60,000 watts
- HAAT: 112 meters (367 ft)
- Transmitter coordinates: 42°12′55.5″N 121°47′55″W

Links
- Public license information: Public file; LMS
- Webcast: Listen live
- Website: www.mybasin.com

KFXX-FM (99.5 FM) is a commercial radio station licensed to Klamath Falls, Oregon, United States. The station is owned by Basin Mediactive, LLC.

== History ==
The station was assigned the call letters KAGM on October 15, 1973. On May 16, 1980, the station changed its call sign to KAGO-FM. On May 8, 2017, the station changed its callsign to the current KFXX-FM.

On May 10, 2017, the station moved its mainstream rock format (and the KAGO-FM calls) to new sign-on 94.9 FM Altamont, Oregon, while 99.5 FM began stunting with a loop of Ylivs' "What Does the Fox Say", in preparation of a new format to launch on Friday, May 12, 2017 at 8 am. On May 12, 2017 at 8 am, KFXX-FM launched a classic hits format, branded as "99.5 The Fox".
