= Altamont, Oregon =

Unincorporated community in the state of Oregon, United States

- Census-designated place
- Location of Altamont, Oregon
- Coordinates: 42°11′46″N 121°44′19″W
- Country: United States
- State: Oregon
- County: Klamath

Area
  - Total: 8.08 sq mi (20.93 km^{2})
  - Land: 8.08 sq mi (20.93 km^{2})
  - Water: 0 sq mi (0.00 km^{2})
- Elevation: 4,141 ft (1,262 m)

Population (2020)
  - Total: 20,233
  - Density: 2,503.3/sq mi (966.52/km^{2})
- Time zone: UTC-8 (Pacific (PST))
  - Summer (DST): UTC-7 (PDT)
- ZIP code: 97603
- Area codes: 458 and 541
- FIPS code: 41-01850
- GNIS feature ID: 2407733

Altamont is a census-designated place (CDP) and unincorporated community in Klamath County, Oregon, United States, southeast of Klamath Falls. As of the 2020 Census, the population was 20,233. All mailing addresses in Altamont are Klamath Falls addresses, although Altamont is outside of the city limits of Klamath Falls.

== History ==
Altamont may have been named after a locally famous trotting horse named Altamont, by a prominent local horseman, Jay Beach. An Altamont post office was in operation from 1895 to 1902.

== Geography ==
Altamont is located in southern Klamath County at 4,144 feet (1,263 m) above sea level. It is bordered to the north and west by the city of Klamath Falls, the county seat. Oregon Route 39 passes through the center of the community as South 6th Street and the Crater Lake Parkway, while Oregon Route 140 (Southside Expressway) runs along the southern edge of the community. OR 39 leads northwest into Klamath Falls and southeast 21 miles (34 km) to the California border at Hatfield, while OR 140 leads east 93 miles (150 km) to Lakeview and west 72 miles (116 km) to White City near Medford.

According to the United States Census Bureau, the Altamont CDP has a total area of 8.1 square miles (21.0 km^{2}), all land.

== Demographics ==
Historical population
Census	Pop.	Note	%±
1950	9,419		—
1960	10,811		14.8%
1970	15,746		45.6%
1980	19,805		25.8%
1990	18,591		−6.1%
2000	19,603		5.4%
2010	19,257		−1.8%
2020	20,233		5.1%

=== 2020 census ===
As of the 2020 census, Altamont had a population of 20,233. The median age was 38.8 years. 23.8% of residents were under the age of 18 and 20.1% of residents were 65 years of age or older. For every 100 females there were 95.5 males, and for every 100 females age 18 and over there were 92.5 males age 18 and over.

99.3% of residents lived in urban areas, while 0.7% lived in rural areas.

There were 8,038 households in Altamont, of which 30.8% had children under the age of 18 living in them. Of all households, 43.9% were married-couple households, 18.7% were households with a male householder and no spouse or partner present, and 28.2% were households with a female householder and no spouse or partner present. About 27.3% of all households were made up of individuals and 14.0% had someone living alone who was 65 years of age or older.

There were 8,538 housing units, of which 5.9% were vacant. The homeowner vacancy rate was 1.6% and the rental vacancy rate was 5.4%.

Racial composition as of the 2020 census
Race	Number	Percent
White	15,621	77.2%
Black or African American	174	0.9%
American Indian and Alaska Native	838	4.1%
Asian	197	1.0%
Native Hawaiian and Other Pacific Islander	36	0.2%
Some other race	1,218	6.0%
Two or more races	2,149	10.6%
Hispanic or Latino (of any race)	3,104	15.3%

=== 2000 census ===
As of the census of 2000, there were 19,603 people, 7,777 households, and 5,420 families residing in the CDP. The population density was 2,248.5 inhabitants per square mile (868.2/km^{2}). There were 8,315 housing units at an average density of 953.8 per square mile (368.3/km^{2}).

The racial makeup of the CDP was:

- 88.65% White
- 0.64% African American
- 3.52% Native American
- 0.77% Asian
- 0.14% Pacific Islander
- 2.82% from other races
- 3.47% from two or more races

6.76% of the population were Hispanic or Latino of any race.

There were 7,777 households, out of which:

- 31.5% had children under the age of 18 living with them
- 53.5% were married couples living together
- 12.0% had a female householder with no husband present
- 30.3% were non-families
- 25.0% of all households were made up of individuals
- 12.4% had someone living alone who was 65 years of age or older

The average household size was 2.51 and the average family size was 2.96.

The age distribution was:

- 26.7% under the age of 18
- 7.7% from 18 to 24
- 25.8% from 25 to 44
- 22.9% from 45 to 64
- 16.8% who were 65 years of age or older

The median age was 38 years. For every 100 females, there were 94.9 males. For every 100 females age 18 and over, there were 90.2 males.

The median income for a household in the CDP was $31,831, and the median income for a family was $37,715. Males had a median income of $31,229 versus $22,495 for females. The per capita income for the CDP was $15,957. About 9.4% of families and 13.7% of the population were below the poverty line, including 19.4% of those under age 18 and 6.4% of those 65 or over.

== Education ==
Most of the CDP is within the Klamath County School District. A northwestern portion is in the Klamath Falls City School District.

It is in the territory of Klamath Community College.

== See also ==
- 1977 Klamath Falls nightclub shooting
