= Frequency of analog TV channels in Vietnam =

Television broadcast frequency in Vietnam

Here are the channel frequency tables of analog television broadcast/received in the provinces of Vietnam, divided by regions across the country. As of 28 December, 2022, analog TV nationwide has stopped broadcasting due to the digitization of television in Vietnam. Previously, analog television in Vietnam was mostly broadcast on the VHF band (from channel 6 to channel 12), and the UHF band (from channel 21 to channel 62). Only a few places broadcast at frequencies below 6 VHF, like 3 VHF in Tam Dao).

== Northwest ==
Channel	Northwest Province					
Channel	Lào Cai	Lai Châu	Yên Bái	Điện Biên	Sơn La	Hòa Bình
6	VTV3 VTV1 (Mường Khương, Bắc Hà & Sapa, Bảo Yên, Văn Bàn) VTV1/2/3 (Bát Xát) VTV1/3 (Si Ma Cai) VTV2 (Mường Khương) THLC (Bảo Yên)	VTV1 VTV1/3 (Nậm Nhùn, Phong Thổ) VTV1/VTV3 (Sìn Hồ) VTV1 (Tam Đường, Tân Uyên) LTV (Than Uyên)	VTV3 (cũ) VTV1 (cũ) YTV (sau này) YTV (1 số huyện) VTV1 (Văn Chấn) VTV1/VTV3 (Trạm Tấu) YTV (một số huyện) VTV1 (Mù Cang Chải)	VTV1/VTV2/Điện Biên Đông; VTV1 (Tuần Giáo, Mường Chà, Nặm Pồ); VTV1 (H.Điện Biên) VTV2; VTV2 (Mường Ảng); VTV3/VTV2/TH Tủa Chùa; VTV2/VTV3/VTV5 (Tuần Giáo); ĐTV (Mường Lay)	STV VTV3 (Mộc Châu, Phù Yên) VTV1/VTV2 (Nà Mường, Chiềng Khừa – Mộc Châu); VTV6 VTV1 (Sông Mã) VTV1, VTV2 (Mường Bang, Mường Do – Phù Yên) STV (Vân Hồ, Mai Sơn, Bắc Yên) VTV1/VTV2/VTV3 (Chiềng Sại, Bắc Yên) VTV1/VTV2/VTV5 (Mai Sơn) VTV1/VTV2/STV (Mường La) VTV2 (Bắc Yên) VTV2 (Sốp Cộp) VTV1 (Vân Hồ, Yên Châu, Quỳnh Nhai) VTV1/VTV3 (Bắc Yên)	VTV1 + VTV1/2/3 (Mai Châu) HBTV/VTV3/TH Cao Phong HBTV/VTV3 (Lương Sơn) HBTV/VTV3 (Tân Lạc) VTV1 (Lạc Sơn, Lạc Thủy)
7	VTV1/VTV2/TH Bắc Hà VTV3/TH Bát Xát, Văn Bàn THLC (Si Ma Cai) VTV1 (Bảo Thắng)	VTV3 (trước 2004) VTV3/TH Mường Tè VTV1/VTV3/TH Nậm Nhùn	VTV1/VTV3/YTV (Mù Cang Chải, Yên Bình) VTV1 (Lục Yên, Văn Yên, Nghĩa Lộ, Văn Chấn)	VTV1	VTV1/VTV2/VTV5 (Mai Sơn) VTV1/VTV3 (Mộc Châu, Bắc Yên) VTV1/VTV3/STV (Mường La) VTV1 (Phù Yên, Quỳnh Nhai, Sông Mã, Yên Hồ) VTV1/VTV2 (Yên Châu) VTV1/2/3/5 (Thuận Châu) VTV2 (Sông Mã)	HBTV/VTV3 (Yên Thủy) VTV1 (Lạc Thủy, Cao Phong, Đà Bắc, Kim Bôi, Kỳ Sơn, Tân Lạc, Mai Châu) VTV1/2/HBTV (Kỳ Sơn)
8	THLC/VTV1 VTV1/2/3 (Mường Khương) VTV1 (Bảo Yên) VTV2 (Bắc Hà) VTV3 (Sapa)	VTV2 VTV1/3 (Than Uyên)	VTV1/VTV2 (Văn Chấn) VTV1 (Văn Yên) YTV (Trạm Tấu) VTV1/VTV2/VTV5 (Mù Cang Chải)	VTV6; ĐTV (cũ) VTV2/ĐTV (Điện Biên Đông) ĐTV (H.Điện Biên) VTV1 (Mường Nhé) VTV3/TH Mường Lay	VTV1 VTV3/TH Vân Hồ VTV1/VTV3 (Bắc Yên, Chiềng Hoa – Mường La) VTV1/VTV2/VTV5 (Cò Nòi, Tà Hộc – Mai Sơn) VTV3/TH Mai Sơn VTV1 (Mộc Châu, Sông Mã, Sốp Cộp) VTV1/STV (Mường La) VTV3/STV/TH Quỳnh Nhai VTV1/VTV3/VTV5 (Yên Châu)	Hà Sơn Bình → HBTV; VTV6 (2007–2010, tiếp sóng) HBTV (Lạc Thủy, Lạc Sơn) VTV1/VTV3 (Lạc Thủy) VTV1 (Lạc Sơn); VTV3 (Tân Lạc)
9	THLC VTV1/VTV3 (Bản Hồ, Sapa)	LTV (cũ)/VTV1 VTV1/VTV3 (Mường Tè, Phong Thổ) VTV1/LTV/VTV1/VTV3 + TH Sìn Hồ VTV2 (Tam Đường) VTV1/VTV3/TH Tân Uyên VTV1 (Nậm Nhùn)	YTV (một số huyện) VTV2 (Nghĩa Lộ, Lục Yên)	VTV6/HN1 (tiếp sóng); ĐTV (chính) VTV2/ĐTV + VTV3/VTV1 (Tuần Giáo) ĐTV (Mường Chà, Nặm Pô) VTV2/VTV3/ĐTV (Điện Biên Đông) VTV3/TH Mường Ảng VTV1 (Tủa Chùa) VTV1/VTV3 (Mường Lay)	STV VTV3 / TH Sông Mã VTV1 (Phù Yên) VTV1/2/3/STV (Mường La, Quỳnh Nhai) VTV1/VTV5 (Yên Châu) VTV1/STV (Thuận Châu)	HBTV/VTV1 (Mai Châu)
10	VTV3/TH Mường Khương & Bảo Yên THLC (Bắc Hà) VTV1 (Mường Khương)	LTV (chính); VTV1/VTV2/Mường La VTV1/VTV3 (Mường Tè) VTV1 (Than Uyên)	VTV1 (sau này) VTV2 Hoàng Liên Sơn ➡ YTV (cũ) VTV1/VTV3 (Mù Cang Chải) VTV3/Trạm Tấu	VTV3/TH Điện Biên Đông, H.Điện Biên VTV6 (cũ) VTV2 (Mường Nhé, Mường Lay)	VTV3 VTV1/STV/VTV2 (Mộc Châu) VTV1/2/TH Mộc Châu VTV1 (Bắc Yên) VTV1/2/5 (Mường Chanh, Tà Hộc – Mai Sơn) VTV2/STV (Mường La) VTV3/TH Sốp Cộp, Vân Hồ VTV1/VTV3 (Quỳnh Nhai)	VTV3 VTV3/TH Tân Lạc & Lạc Thủy, Lạc Sơn VTV6 VTV3/TH Cao Phong HBTV (Đà Bắc) VTV1/VTV2 (Kim Bôi) VTV1 (Lạc Sơn, Tân Lạc (cũ)) VTV1/VTV3 (Yên Thủy)
11	THLC (Sapa) VTV2 (Sapa) VTV3/TH Bảo Thắng	VTV3 (Tam Đường) VTV1/VTV3 (Tân Uyên)	YTV (một số huyện) VTV3/YTV/TH Văn Chấn, Lục Yên, Nghĩa Lộ VTV1/2/3/5 (Trạm Tấu) VTV1/VTV3 (Văn Yên)	ĐTV; HTV7	VTV3 VTV3/TH Thuận Châu VTV1 (Sông Mã) VTV2/VTV3/VTV5 (Quỳnh Nhai) VTV1/VTV2/VTV5 (Mai Sơn)	VTV1/VTV3/TH Yên Thủy
12	VTV2/VTV1 VTV2 (Bảo Yên) VTV3/TH Bắc Hà, Si Ma Cai, Văn Bàn	VTV3 VTV1/3/LTV/TH Mường Tè VTV1 & VTV2 (Sìn Hồ) VTV2 (Tân Uyên, Than Uyên) VTV3/Than Uyên	VTV2 VTV1/2/3/5/YTV (Trạm Tấu) VTV1/2/3 (Yên Bình) VTV3/TH Lục Yên VTV1 (Văn Chấn)	VTV3 VTV2/VTV3/ĐTV/Mường Nhé VTV1 (Mường Ảng, Mường Lay) VTV1/VTV3/TH Nặn Pô VTV2/VTV3/TH Tủa Chùa VTV3/TH Tuần Giáo VTV1/VTV2/VTV5 (Tuần Giáo) VTV3/TH Mường Chà VTV3/VTV1 (Điện Biên Đông)	VTV2 STV (Phù Yên) VTV1 (Mộc Châu, Vân Hồ) VTV1/VTV3/VTV4 (Mường La) VTV2/STV (Yên Châu) VTV3/TH Thuận Châu VTV2/VTV3 (Mộc Châu)	HBTV VTV3/TH Mai Châu, Kim Bôi, Lạc Sơn, Yên Thủy VTV1/VTV2 (Lương Sơn) VTV1 (Tân Lạc, Đà Bắc)
22	VTV3/TH Sapa	LTV (Điện Biên cũ)	VTV2 (cũ); VTV3; VTV1 (Lục Yên, Văn Chấn)	HTV9; ĐTV		–
23	VTV2	–	VTV2	VTV1; VTV2	VTV2	
25	VTV6 (cũ)	VTV1; VTV5	VTV2 (Lục Yên); VTV1/VTV3/YTV (Văn Chấn)			
27	VTV6	VTV3	VTV3			
28	VTV5 (Sapa)		VTV3/YTV (Lục Yên) VTV3/Văn Chấn		VTV5 (Mường La)	VTV2
29	–	VTV2	–	–	–	–
30				VTV6/ĐTV VTV1/2/3/ĐTV (Tuần Giáo)		
31	–	–	–	–	–	VTV1
32					VTV1 (TP Sơn La)	HBTV (Lạc Thủy)
33		VTV5 (Mường Tè)	–	–	–	VTV3
34					VTV2/VTV3 (Chiềng Đen, TP Sơn La)	
35		LTV (Nậm Nhùn)				
36					VTV2/VTV1/VTV3 (Hua La, TP Sơn La) VTV5 (Mường La)	VTV1 (Lạc Thủy)
38					VTV1/VTV3 (Chiềng Xôm, TP Sơn La)	
39						VTV3 (Kỳ Sơn) VTV1 (Mai Châu)
45						VTV6?
47	–	LTV (Tân Uyên)	–	–	STV/VTV2 (Mộc Châu)	–
52						HBTV
Kênh	Lào Cai	Lai Châu	Yên Bái	Điện Biên	Sơn La	Hòa Bình

== Northeast ==
Channels	Northeast Province								
Channels	Hà Giang	Cao Bằng	Bắc Kạn	Lạng Sơn	Tuyên Quang	Thái Nguyên	Phú Thọ	Bắc Giang	Quảng Ninh
3	–	–	–	–	VTV1			–	–
6	Hà Tuyên -> HGTV (VTV1/VTV2/VTV6) VTV3 (sau này) VTV1/VTV3/HGTV/TH Bắc Quang VTV1 (Vị Xuyên, Xín Mần, Quang Bình, Bắc Mê, Yên Minh, Đồng Văn, Hoàng Su Phì, Mèo Vạc) HGTV (Yên Minh) VTV1/HGTV (Bắc Mê) VTV1/VTV3 (Đồng Văn)	VTV2 VTV1 (Bảo Lâm, Bảo Lạc, Hạ Lang, Nguyên Bình, Phục Hòa, Trà Lĩnh, Thông Nông, Trùng Khánh, Hà Quảng) VTV1/VTV2/VTV3 (Thạch An) VTV1/VTV3/CRTV (Hòa An)	TBK (Chợ Đồn) VTV1 (Chợ Mới, Pác Nậm) VTV1/VTV3 (Xã Văn Tùng, Nà Pặc, Bằng Vân – Ngân Sơn) VTV1/VTV3 (X.Vũ Muộn, Bạch Thông) VTV1/TBK/VTV3 (Ba Bể) VTV3/TH Pác Nậm	VTV1/VTV3 (Lộc Bình) VTV1 (Đình Lập, Tràng Định, Cao Lộc, Hữu Lũng) VTV1/LSTV (Văn Quan) VTV1/VTV3 (Chi Lăng, Bình Gia) VTV1/2/3 (Bắc Sơn)	TTV (Tuyên Quang) (Note: Một số huyện thuộc Tuyên Quang) VTV1 (Lâm Bình, Hàm Yên) VTV3/Sơn Dương VTV1/VTV3 (Na Hang) VTV1 (TP. Tuyên Quang)	VTV1 TN1 (Đại Từ) VTV3 (Võ Nhai)	VTV3/TH Thanh Ba; HanoiTV1	BGTV (BBS) (Note: Phát tại huyện Lục Ngạn (Bắc Giang))	QTV1 (trước 2013)/VTV1 (Cô Tô) VTV1 (Cẩm Phả, Móng Cái, Uông Bí) QTV1/VTV1/VTV3 (Bình Liêu) VTV2 (Ba Chẽ)
7	VTV1 (Cổng trời Quản Bạ)	VTV1/CRTV (Trà Lĩnh)	Bắc Thái → TBK VTV3 (Cốc Đán – Ngân Sơn) VTV1/VTV3 + TH Ba Bể VTV1/TBK (Chợ Đồn) VTV1 (Pác Nậm)	VTV3 VTV3 (Hữu Lũng) VTV1/VTV3 (Lộc Bình) VTV1 (Cao Lộc)	VTV3/TH Yên Sơn TTV (Sơn Dương)	Bắc Thái → TN → TN2/HTV7/VTV3	Vĩnh Phú (VTP) →PTV; PTV/VTV3 (Thanh Sơn)	BGTV (BBS)/VTV3 (Lục Nam) VTV1/VTV4/VTV5; VTV1 (Lục Ngạn)	QTV3 QTV1 (Đầm Hà, Uông Bí) VTV1 (Ba Chẽ, Hải Hà) VTV1/3/QTV1 (Vân Đồn) VTV1 (Cẩm Phả)
8	VTV1 VTV2/HGTV (Hoàng Su Phì) HGTV (Đồng Văn) VTV1/VTV3 (Yên Minh, Bắc Quang) VTV1/HGTV (Bắc Mê)	VTV1 VTV1 (Nguyên Bình) VTV2 (Phục Hòa) VTV3/TH Thông Nông, Trà Lĩnh) VTV1 (Trùng Khánh)	TBK (Ba Bể) VTV3 (Văn Tùng – Ngân Sơn) VTV1/TH Pác Nậm VTV1 (TT.Phủ Thông, Bạch Thông, Pác Nậm, Phục Hòa) VTV1/TBK (Chợ Đồn)	VTV3/Lộc Bình VTV3 (Chi Lăng) VTV2 (Bắc Sơn)	Hà Tuyên -> TTV (Tuyên Quang) TTV/VTV1/VTV3 (Chiêm Hóa) VTV1 (Na Hang)	VTV3/Đại Từ TN1 (Định Hóa)	TTV (Tuyên Quang)	Hà Bắc -> BGTV (BBS) VTV1 (Sơn Đông) VTV2/VTV3 (Lục Ngạn) TH Yên Thế	VTV3 (Hoành Bồ) VTV2 (Cô Tô) VTV1 (Đầm Hà, Ba Chẽ,Mỏ than Mông Dương, Cẩm Phả)
9	VTV2 (Cổng trời Quản Bạ) HGTV (Mèo Vạc) HGTV/VTV2 (1 số huyện khác) VTV1/VTV3 (Yên Minh) VTV1 (Quang Bình) VTV1/VTV3 (Vị Xuyên)	VTV3/VTV1 (Hà Quảng) VTV2 (Bảo Lâm, Trà Lĩnh) VTV3/ TH Bảo Lạc, Hạ Lang, Thông Nông, Nguyên Bình VTV1 (Hòa An, Phục Hòa, Trùng Khánh, Quảng Uyên)	VTV3/TH Chợ Mới VTV3/Ngân Sơn (X. Thượng Ân) VTV3 (Sỹ Bình, Bạch Thông) VTV1/TBK (Chợ Đồn)	LSTV2/VTV6 LSTV VTV2 (Đình Lập) VTV3 (Cao Lộc) VTV1/VTV3 (Tràng Định) VTV1/VTV3 (Văn Lãng)	TTV (Chiêm Hóa) VTV2/3/Hàm Yên	VTV3/TN1 (Phú Lương)	VTV1 (Hà Nội)	VTV2	VTV3/QTV1 (Móng Cái) VTV3 (Cẩm Phả) VTV3 (Đầm Hà) VTV1 (Bình Liêu, Ba Chẽ, Tiên Yên)
10	VTV3/VTV5/TH Hoàng Su Phì VTV3/TH Yên Minh, Bắc Mê, Đồng Văn VTV2 (Yên Minh, Bắc Quang) VTV3/TH Đồng Văn VTV1/VTV3 (Vị Xuyên)	VTV3/TH Phục Hòa VTV2 (Trà Lĩnh) CRTV/VTV1/VTV3 (Hòa An)	VTV1 VTV2 TBK VTV1/VTV3/TBK/TH Ba Bể, Chợ Đồn VTV1 (Na Rì)	LSTV1/VTV2 VTV1 (Hữu Lũng) VTV3 (Văn Quan, Bắc Sơn, Bình Gia, Cao Lộc) VTV1/VTV3 (Chi Lăng) VTV2 (Bình Gia)	VTV1/VTV3/TTV (Chiêm Hóa) TTV (Sơn Dương) VTV2/TTV (Na Hang)		VTV3/TH Cẩm Khê, Đoan Hùng PTV (Tân Sơn)	VTV3 (Lục Ngạn) VTV1 (Yên Thế) VTV3/BGTV/TH Sơn Động	VTV3/TH Uông Bí? VTV3/TH Cô Tô, Hải Hà, Vân Đồn VTV2 (Đầm Hà) VTV1 (Ba Chẽ, Hoành Bồ) VTV3 (Mỏ than Mông Dương, Cẩm Phả) QTV1 (Cẩm Phú, Cẩm Phả)
11	VTV2 VTV3 HGTV (sau này)/VTV6 (tiếp sóng) VTV3/TH Quang Bình	CRTV VTV1 (Hà Quảng) VTV3/TH Trà Lĩnh VTV3 (Thông Nông)	VTV1/ TH Chợ Đồn	VTV3/Đình Lập VTV1 (Lộc Bình) VTV1/VTV3 (Văn Lãng) VTV1/LSTV (Văn Quan) VTV1/VTV2 (Đình Lập)	TTV (Tuyên Quang)/VTV1/VTV3 (Chiêm Hóa, Hàm Yên)		VTV2 (Hà Nội)	VTV3	VTV2 (Móng Cái, Tiên Yên) VTV3 (Bình Liêu)
12	HGTV/ VTV1 & VTV3 (Đồng Văn) VTV3/TH Vị Xuyên, Cổng trời Quản Bạ) VTV1/VTV3 (Xín Mần)	VTV3/TH Bảo Lâm, Hà Quảng VTV2 (Hạ Lang, Quảng Uyên)	VTV1; VTV2 VTV3/TH Bạch Thông, Na Rì VTV3	VTV1 LSTV LSTV (Hữu Lũng) VTV1 (Bắc Sơn, Bình Gia) VTV1/VTV3 (Chi Lăng)	VTV3 VTV3/Chiêm Hóa, Na Hang TTV (Lâm Bình)	VTV3/TN1 (Võ Nhai)	VTV3/VTV1/TH Hạ Hòa, Thanh Sơn, Tam Nông, Yên Lập; VP (cũ)	BGTV (BBS) /THVL1 (thị trấn Neo) VTV1 + VTV3/TH Lục Ngạn VTV1/VTV3 (Yên Dũng, Lục Nam) VTV3/TH Sơn Đông BGTV (BBS) (Yên Thế)	QTV/VTV1 (đến 2001); QTV1 VTV3/Vân Đồn VTV1/3/QTV1 (Đầm Hà) QTV1 (Móng Cái)
15	HGTV								
21	–	–	–	VTV2 VTV1 (Chi Lăng)	VTV1/TTV (Hàm Yên)	VTV3	–	–	QTV1 (Hạ Long, Hải Hà, Bình Liêu) VTV1 (Vân Đồn)
22	VTV1 (Bắc Quang)						VTV3 (Hà Nội)	VTV3 (Hà Nội)	QTV1 (Cẩm Phả) VTV3/TH Ba Chẽ
23	VTV2	VTV3	–	VTV3/Chi Lăng	–	–	–	–	QTV1 (Đông Triều); VTV2 (Móng Cái)
24							Hà Tây ➡ HanoiTV 2	Hà Tây ➡ HanoiTV 2	QTV3 (Bình Liêu); QTV1 (Tiên Yên); VTV1/QTV (Hạ Long); VTV1 (Cẩm Phả)
25	VTV2 (Bắc Quang)	–	VTV3	–	–	–	–	–	VTV3/TH Đông Triều; VTV3 (Móng Cái)
26	–	VTV/CRTV (Nguyên Bình)	–	–	VTV3		–	–	VTV3 (Uông Bí, Vân Đồn)
27							PTV (Thị xã Phú Thọ)		QTV3/VTV1 (Đông Triều); VTV3 (Cẩm Phú, Cẩm Phả)
28	VTV3 (Bắc Quang)				TTV (Lâm Bình)				QTV1 (Vân Đồn); VTV3 (Tiên Yên); VTV3 (Bình Liêu)
30	–	–	–	–	–	–	BGTV (BBS)	BGTV (BBS)	VTV1 (Cô Tô); BGTV (BBS)
31	–	–	–	–	VTV3	–	–	–	VTV3
32	–	–	–	–	TN1	TN1 (chính)	TN1	TN1	–
33	–	–	TBK; VTV6	VTV6	THVL1	–	–	–	VTV1
34	–	–	–	–	VTV2	–	–	–	VTV3 QTV1 (Đông Triều)
35									QTV1 (Tiên Yên, Hải Hà, Bình Liêu, Ba Chẽ); QTV3 (Móng Cái)
36	–	–	–	–	–	–	PTV	BGTV/VTV4 (Hiệp Hòa)	VTV2/QTV2→VTV1 (từ 2014)
37	VTV3/TH Bắc Quang								
38	–	–	–	–	VTV1 TTV (Tuyên Quang)	–	–	–	QTV1
40									QTV1 (Hải Hà, Bình Liêu,Uông Bí) QTV3 (Tiên Yên)
41						VP	VP	VP	VP
42									QTV1 (Cô Tô )
45									VTV3 (trước 2013)/QTV3/QTV1 (Cô Tô) QTV1 (Uông Bí, Hoàng Bồ)
47				VTV1/LSTV (Văn Lãng)					QTV3 (Cô Tô)
48									VTV1
49									
50									QTV1 (Cẩm Phả)
51									QTV1 (Đầm Hà)
52									QTV1 (Quảng Yên)
54						VTV6 (Hà Nội)	VTV6 (Hà Nội)	VTV6 (Hà Nội)	
Kênh	Hà Giang	Cao Bằng	Bắc Kạn	Lạng Sơn	Tuyên Quang	Thái Nguyên	Phú Thọ	Bắc Giang	Quảng Ninh

== Red River Delta ==
Channels	Red River Delta province									
Channels	Hà Nội	Hải Phòng	Bắc Ninh	Hà Nam	Hải Dương	Hưng Yên	Nam Định	Thái Bình	Vĩnh Phúc	Ninh Bình
2	VTV4	–	–	–	–	–	–	–	VTV (Tam Đảo cũ)	VTV1/một số đài huyện
3	VTV1 (Tam Đảo)									VTV1 (TP Tam Điệp) VTV3/1 số đài huyện
4	VTV4/VTV5 (trước 2004) → VTV5 VTV1 (Hà Tây)	–	–	–	–	–	–	–	–	VTV3 TH Yên Mô + K+1/VTV6 TH TP Tam Điệp / 1 số đài huyện
5	–	–	–	–	–	–	–		–	1 số đài huyện
6	VTV1 (1990–1994); HanoiTV (sáng chủ nhật); OPT1 (đến 1996) → HanoiTV/VTV3 (đến 10/1997) → HanoiTV1	VTV1 (Bạch Long Vĩ) VTV1 (Cát Bà) (Note: thu tại đảo Cát Bà (Hải Phòng)); VTV1 (Kiến An)	VTV1 (1990–1994); HanoiTV (sáng chủ nhật) OPT1 (Hà Nội, trước 1996) → HanoiTV/VTV3 (đến 10/1997) → HanoiTV1		HTV9 THD (Kinh Môn) VTV1 (1990–1994); HanoiTV (sáng chủ nhật) OPT1 (Hà Nội, trước 1996) → HanoiTV/VTV3 (đến 10/1997) → HanoiTV1 TBTV (cũ)	VTV1 (1990–1994); HanoiTV (sáng chủ nhật) OPT1 (Hà Nội, trước 1996) → HanoiTV/VTV3 (đến 10/1997) → HanoiTV1	TBTV (cũ) VTV2/VTV3; HN1 VTV2 (2015–2016) NBTV (cũ)		VTV3/TH Vĩnh Tường VTV1 (1990–1994); HanoiTV (sáng chủ nhật) OPT1 (Hà Nội, trước 1996) → HanoiTV/VTV3 (đến 10/1997) → HanoiTV1	NBTV (cũ) → NBTV+/VCTV2 → NBTV+/VTV3; VTV1/TH Tam Điệp
7	THD2/VTV3 VCTV MMDS (Hà Tây cũ)	VTV3 (Thủy Nguyên); QTV3 THD2/VTV3	BTV (Bắc Ninh)	Hải Hưng -> THD -> THD2/VTV3 HY/O2TV-VCTV10	Hải Hưng → THD → THD2/VTV3	Hải Hưng→HY/O2TV-VCTV10 THD2/VTV3	HTV9	HTV9	Vĩnh Phú (cũ)	VTV3 KBS; VTV3/TH Tam Điệp
8	HTV7? TH Làng Vạn Phúc Catroon Network (MMDS, phát & thu được ở Hà Tây cũ)	VTV3 THP VTV2 (Bạch Long Vĩ)	Hà Bắc (cũ)	Hà Nam Ninh -> Nam Hà	Hải Hưng/VTV1 (cũ)	Hải Hưng/VTV1 (cũ)	VTV3 (tiếp sóng) Hà Nam Ninh -> Nam Hà -> NTV (Nam Định)	TBTV	HTV7?	HTV7? VTV2; Hà Nam Ninh (cũ); VTC1
9	VTV1/HanoiTV (từ 1990) →VTV1/VTV3/HN1 (đến 1994) →VTV1/VTV2/VTV3 (đến 3/1998) →VTV1/VTV2 (đến 2001)→VTV1								HTV7 (Vĩnh Tường); VTV1 (Hà Nội)	VTV1; VTC4
10	OPT1 (Hà Nội) DRT (Đắk Lắk, phát lậu); VTV1/Hà Tây cũ (Ba Vì); HANAM/HTV7	THP → VTV1 VTV3/TH Bạch Long Vĩ	OPT1 (Hà Nội cũ)	Hà Nam Ninh -> Nam Hà -> HANAM (THHN); HTV7/VTV3	HANAM/HTV7		VCTV1; VTV1 (Ý Yên)	HANAM/HTV7	–	Hà Nam Ninh → NBTV; NBTV (Nho Quan)
11	VTV1 (đến 1990) → VTV2	THP (Note: thu tại Q. Đồ Sơn (Hải Phòng))	VTV1 (đến 1990) → VTV2 (Hà Nội)							Catroon Network; VTC14
12	QTV1 (Quảng Ninh) Hà Sơn Bình (cũ) → HTV Hà Tây (cũ)	VTV3 TH Cát Bà THP (Bạch Long Vĩ); QTV1 (từ Quảng Ninh)	BTV (Bắc Ninh)	VTV1	THD (TP Chí Linh); BTV (Bắc Ninh)	QTV1 (Quảng Ninh) HTV Hà Tây (cũ); VTV3/NBTV+	VTV3/NBTV+ HTV (Hà Tây cũ)	VTV3/NBTV+	VP	NBTV+/VCTV2 → NBTV+/VTV3
13–14	CCTV4, CNN (MMDS, tiếp phát analog Hà Tây)									True Visions; MTV, CNN
15	MTV (MMDS, qua trạm tiếp phát analog từ Hà Tây)	–	–	–	–	–	–		–	True Visions; OPT1
16	HBO/Cinemax (MMDS)									True Visions; VCTV1
17										True Visions; Catroon Network
18										True Visions; BBC
19										True Visions
21	CCTV (Hà Tây cũ)	HTV7								VOV1 (phát tiếng, có hình testcard); CNBC
22	VTV4 + VTV2/VTV3 ➡ VTV3									TH Gia Viễn HN1/HN2/DNRTV1 VOV2 (phát tiếng, có hình testcard)
23	HTV3, VTV4 (Hà Tây)									HBO; HTVC Thuần Việt; NHK World; VTVCab 2
24	Hà Tây TV → HanoiTV2	THP (Note: thu tại Q. Kiến An (Hải Phòng))	Hà Tây TV → HanoiTV2							VOV3; VCTV1-12, 15, 16; HTVC Du lịch
25	–	VTV2 (Nam Định)	Star Movies	–	–	–	VTV2	VTV2 (Nam Định)	–	BBC; SCTV1; VTVCab1
26	Hà Tây VTV (cũ, 1995 – 1998)	THP (Cát Bà – Cát Hải)	CCTV1	–	–	–	–	–	–	DW-TV; MEGA; Playhouse
27	DN3 (Hà Tây)	–	True Sports HD	–	–	–	–	–	–	VTV1
28	THP		HTV3; THP (Hải Phòng)	THP					–	VCTV3; Disney
29	VTC1 (đến 2014)	kênh analog lậu ở An Lão	–	–	–	VTC1 (đến 2014)	–	–	–	VCTV2 -> VTVCab 5
30	BGTV	kênh analog lậu ở An Lão /BGTV	BGTV		BGTV	BGTV				VCTV7
31	VTC7 (đến 2014) VTC1 (Hà Tây)	Một số kênh analog lậu ở An Lão: Disney, CNN, HBO, Star Movies, CN...	–	–	Một số kênh analog lậu ở Huyện Nam Sách: CN, CNN, BBC, HBO, Cinemax,....	VTC7 (đến 2014)	VTC9→VTC1	–	–	VCTV8
32	TN1 VTC3? VTC2 (Hà Tây)	Một số kênh analog lậu ở An Lão: Disney, CNN, HBO, Star Movies, CN...	HTV9	–	Một số kênh analog lậu ở Huyện Nam Sách: CN, CNN, BBC, HBO, Cinemax,....	TN1	VTV1 (Thái Bình)	VTV1	–	HTV7
33	VTC2 → VTC9 HTV7 (Hà Tây)	Một số kênh analog lậu ở An Lão: Disney, CNN, HBO, Star Movies, CN...	–	–	Một số kênh analog lậu ở Huyện Nam Sách: CN, CNN, BBC, HBO, Cinemax,....	VTC9	–	–	–	HTV9; Boomerang
34	THDT1 (Hà Tây)	Một số kênh analog lậu ở An Lão: Disney, CNN, HBO, Star Movies, CN...			Một số kênh analog lậu ở Huyện Nam Sách: CN, CNN, BBC, HBO, Cinemax,....					THVL1
35	TBTV	kênh analog lậu ở An Lão /TBTV	TBTV				TBTV	TBTV	–	CCTV; BTV4
36	PTV (Phú Thọ) BTV1 (Hà Tây)	Một số kênh analog lậu ở An Lão: MTV, CCTV...			Một số kênh analog lậu ở huyện Nam Sách; VTV1/VTV3 (Kinh Môn)				PTV (Phú Thọ)	VTC1
37	NTV (Nam Định)	Một kênh analog lậu ở An Lão /BTV Bắc Ninh	BTV (Bắc Ninh)	BTV (Bắc Ninh)	BTV (Bắc Ninh)/NTV (Nam Định)	NTV (Nam Định); VTV2 (tiếp sóng)			BTV (Bắc Ninh)	VTC2
38	VOVTV →TH Quốc Hội HTV9 (Hà Tây)	VTV2 THP	VOVTV -> TH Quốc Hội (Hà Nội)	–	Một số kênh analog lậu ở Nam Sách	VOVTV -> TH Quốc Hội	–	–	–	VTC3; CCTV1; VTV5; BRT; HTVC Phụ nữ
39	Kênh thử nghiệm (từ 2004); NBTV	NBTV	HTV7; NBTV	NBTV	HTV3/Star Movies (huyện Nam Sách)	NBTV	NBTV	NBTV		NBTV
40	THD1								–	VTC4
41	VP	VP	VP	VP	VP	VP	VP		VP	VTC5?
42	HY					HY/O2TV-VCTV10	HY	HY	–	Star Movies
43	VTC5 → VTC9 THVL1 (Hà Tây)									CCTV1→ HTV3→ VTC7; VTC6
44	VTC1 (từ 2014) LA34 (Hà Tây)	VTV2 VTC5→VTC9	–	–	VTV2	VTC1 (từ 2014)	–		–	VTC7; Kidsco
45	HANAM (THHN) VTC5 (Note: Đến khi kênh đổi tên thành VBC)	HANAM (THHN)	–	HANAM (THHN)	HANAM	HANAM / VTC5	HANAM (THHN)	HANAM	–	VTC8
46	VTC7 (từ 2014) TTV11 (Hà Tây)	VTV3	–	HTV7?	VTV3	VTC7 (từ 2014)	HTV7? (thu từ hướng Hà Nội?)	–	HTV7? (Thu từ hướng Hà Nội?)	NATGeo; VTC9
47	BTV2 (Hà Tây)	–	–	–	–	–	VTV3	VTV3 (Nam Định)	–	Animal Planet
48	–	HTV9	–	–	–	–	VTV1/NTV (Nam Định)/ TH Giao Thủy (Note: thu tại huyện Giao Thủy (Nam Định))	–	–	VTC14; TVOne
49	HN2 (Note: Kênh phát sóng thử nghiệm năm 2007) → HN3/HN1 (Note: Kênh tiếp sóng nguyên vẹn HN1)									Discovery/NAT Geo; VTC16 BTV2
50	–		–	–	–		VTV3	VTV3 (Nam Định/Thái Bình)	–	ITV – VTC13/Animal Planet
51										Channel News Asia
52	BTV (Bắc Ninh)	VTV2 (Cát Bà)	BTV (Bắc Ninh)	–	THD/VTV3 (Kinh Môn)	BTV (Bắc Ninh)		–	–	VTV4? Star Movies
53	–	VTV6 (Nam Định)	–	–	–	–	VTV6	VTV6 (Nam Định)	–	Australia Network
54	VTV6									VTV5? Phoenix
55							VTV3 (Hải Hậu)			VTV9; DW; VTV3/TH Nho Quan
56										VTV Đà Nẵng; Star Sports; SCTV2
57	–		–	–	–	–	–	–	–	VTV9; ESPN; VCTV1; CNBC
58										Catroon Network; HTVC Ca nhạc Ariang
59	HTV Hà Tây (1995 – 2000s)	–	–	–	–	–	–	–	–	VTV Đà Nẵng; Star World; TV5Monde
60										AXN
61										MAX
62	–		–	–	–	–	–	–	–	VTV Cần Thơ 1? MTV
63–69										63: Fox Movies; 64: VTVCab 3, NHK; 65: K+1; 66: K+NS VTVCab 2 ABC (Úc); 67: VTC3 Channel V; 68: FOX Sports, Catroon Network; 69: HTV Thể thao/Astro Cảm xúc ABC (Mỹ)
Kênh	Hà Nội	Hải Phòng	Bắc Ninh	Hà Nam	Hải Dương	Hưng Yên	Nam Định	Thái Bình	Vĩnh Phúc	Ninh Bình

== North Central ==
Channels	North Central province				
Channels	Thanh Hóa	Nghệ An	Hà Tĩnh	Quảng Bình	Quảng Trị
4	TH Bỉm Sơn				
5			VTV3/TH Cẩm Xuyên (trước 2001)	–	VTV1 (before 2019)
6	TTV (Thanh Hóa)/TH Như Thành (Note: thu tại huyện Như Thành (Thanh Hóa)) VTV1 (Ngọc Lặc, Đông Sơn, Cẩm Thủy, Bá Thước, Quan Sơn, Tĩnh Gia) TTV (Đông Sơn) VTV1/VTV3 (Như Xuân, Quan Hóa, Mường Lát) < VTV1/VTV2/VTV3 (Như Thanh) HTV7 VTV3 (Tĩnh Gia)	VTV2 VTV3 (Quỳ Hợp) VTV1 (Quế Phong) VTV1 (Nghĩa Đàn, Thái Hòa, Quỳnh Lưu) NTV (Quỳ Châu, Quế Phong, Con Cuông, Kỳ Sơn, Yên Thành, Con Cuông ) VTV1/VTV3 (Tương Dương, Quế Phong, Thái Hòa, Quỳ Châu)	VTV2 HTTV VTV3 (Nghi Xuân)	QBTV/TH Tuyên Hóa (Note: thu tại huyện Tuyên Hóa (Quảng Bình))	VTV1 QRTV (Đắk Rông) QRTV (cũ) VTV1+VTV3 (TT. Lao Bảo, Hướng Hoá)
7	VTV3; VTV1 TTV (Thanh Hóa) (cũ) HN1 VTV1 (Thường Xuân, Như Xuân, Tĩnh Gia); VTV1/VTV3 (Quan Hóa) TTV (Lang Chánh)	NTV (Tương Dương, Kỳ Sơn) VTV3/TH Kỳ Sơn + NTV VTV1/VTV3 (Thanh Chương)	VTV3/TH Hương Khê VTV1 (Can Lộc, Hương Sơn)	QBTV TH Minh Hóa; QBTV; VTV1; VTV3/TH Tuyên Hóa TH Bố Trạch; HTV7	VTV1/VTV3 (Đắk Rông) VTV3/TH Hướng Hoá + VTV1 & VTV2 VTV1/2/3 (Hướng Hoá)
8	TTV (Thanh Hóa) TTV (Ngọc Lặc, Thường Xuân) VTV1/VTV3/TTV/TH Thạch Thành VTV3/TTV (Cẩm Thủy) VTV1/VTV3 (Như Xuân, Quan Hóa) VTV2/TTV (Mường Lát, Như Thanh) VTV1 (Thường Xuân, Tĩnh Gia)	VTV1 NTV (Quế Phong, Quỳ Hợp, Quỳ Châu)	–	VTV1/VTV3/TH Tuyên Hóa	VTV1/VTV3 (Đắk Rông) QRTV, VTV1/VTV3 (Hướng Hoá) VTV2 HTV7
9	TTV (Thanh Hóa) – chính TH Bá Thước/VTV1/VTV3/TTV TH Lang Chảnh/VTV1/3/TTV VTV3/TH Quan Hóa, Đông Sơn HTV9	VTV1/VTV3/TH Diễn Châu VTV3/TH Quỳnh Lưu NTV (Tân Kỳ, Tương Dương, Kỳ Sơn, Quỳ Hợp); VTV3/NTV (Anh Sơn) VTV1 & VTV3 (Con Cuông)	VTV3/TH Hương Sơn VTV3 VTV3/6 (Núi Thiên Tượng) HTTV/TH Hương Khê (Note: thu tại huyện Hương Khê (Hà Tĩnh))	QBTV; VTV1 (Minh Hóa) VTV3/TH Minh Hóa TH Bố Trạch; HTV9	VTV3/TH Đắk Rông VTV1/VTV3 (Hướng Hoá)
10	VTV2; VTV3 VTV3/TH Cẩm Thủy TTV (Như Xuân, Mường Lát) VTV1 (Thạch Thành)	VTV1/TH Quỳ Hợp NTV/VTV6 (Quỳ Châu) VTV3; NTV (Nghĩa Đàn) VTV3/TH Kỳ Sơn NTV (Thanh Chương, TX Thái Hòa)	VTV3/TH Vũ Quang, Đức Thọ, Hương Khê HTTV (Kỳ Anh)	VTV2 VTV3 VTV1 (Minh Hóa) VTV1/VTV3/QBTV/TH Tuyên Hóa VTV1/TH Bố Trạch (Note: thu tại huyện Bố Trạch (Quảng Bình))	VTV1 (Đắk Rông) VTV3 (Lao Bảo – Hướng Hoá) VTV1/VTV3 (Hướng Hoá)
11	VTC16/VTV3/TTV/TH Yên Định TTV Thanh Hóa (Đông Sơn) VTV1 (Bá Thước, Lang Chánh, Thạch Thành) VTV1/3/5 (Ngọc Lặc) VTV1/VTV3 (Cẩm Thủy, Như Xuân, Mường Lát) VTV1/3/TTV (Quan Hóa) VTV3/TH Như Thanh, Quan Sơn, Lang Chánh VTV3/TTV/Bỉm Sơn VTV3/TH Lang Chánh	Nghệ Tĩnh → NTV (Nghệ An)/VTV3 VTV3/NTV/TH Tương Dương	Nghệ Tĩnh (cũ)	QBTV/TH Minh Hóa VTV1/TH Tuyên Hóa	QRTV; VTV1 (cũ) VTV1/VTV3 (Đắk Rông) QRTV (Hướng Hoá)
12	VTV2 TTV (Thanh Hóa) (Ngọc Lặc) VTV1/VTV3 (Tĩnh Gia, Bá Thước,Thường Xuân)) VTV1/3/TTV (Quan Sơn, Mường Lát) VTV3/TH Như Xuân VTV1 (Cẩm Thúy) VTV1/3/5 (Ngọc Lặc)	VTV2 VTV3/TH Nghĩa Đàn & TX Thái Hòa < VTV1/3 (Kỳ Sơn) VTV2/VTV3 (Đô Lương)	VTV3/VTV6 VTV1/2/3/TH Kỳ Anh HTTV (Vũ Quang, Hương Khê) VTV3/TH Vũ Quang và Cẩm Xuyên (từ 2001) VTV1 (Hương Sơn) VTV1 (Hồng Lĩnh) VTV2 (Nghi Xuân)	VTV1	VTV1/VTV3/QRTV (Đắk Rông) VTV1/2/3/QRTV (Hướng Hoá)
21	VTV1 (Nga Sơn)	VTV3/ TH Tân Kỳ	VTV1		–
22		VTV1 (Tân Kỳ)			
23	VTV2 (Nga Sơn)	VTV3	VTV3		VTV3 (từ 2017)
24	VTV1	VTV1 (Đô Lương) VTV1/NTV (Anh Sơn)	–		
25	VTV3/TH Nga Sơn				Vĩnh Linh TV
26	–		VTV2		–
27	TTV Thanh Hóa (Nga Sơn)				VTV1/QRTV (Cồn Cỏ)
28	–	VTV2	HTV7 (Note: trước 2010) → HTV4 (Note: từ 2010) TH Hướng Hóa (Quảng Trị)		
29	HTV9				VTV2/VTV3 (Khe Sanh, Hướng Hoá)
30	–	VTV1/VTV3/NTV (Tân Kỳ)	–	–	VTV3; VTV6 (2019)
31					
32	–	–	–	–	VTV2
33			HTTV (Núi Thiên Tượng)		
35	–	–	–	VTC5 -> VTC1	–
36	–	–	HTV9→HTV2 VTV1 (Nghi Xuân)	HTV9→HTV2; VTV1 (Đèo Ngang) VTC9 BTV1	HTV9→HTV2
37			HTV7 (Núi Thiên Tượng)		
38		PTQ1	BTV2		VTV5
39			HTV9 (Núi Thiên Tượng)		
40	VTV6	–	–	–	–
41					
43	–	NTV (Nghệ An); VTV3; VTV6	–		–
44					
47	–	VTV6		VTV1/QBTV (Minh Hóa)	–
50	VTV1 (Thường Xuân)				
52	VTC7				
53		VTC9			VTC9
55		VTC1			VTC1
57	VTC1				HTV4
59	VTC9				
61				Một kênh lậu	
62	TTV				
63–69			Một số kênh lậu:ESPN, True Sports, HBO, Cinemax. . .		Một số kênh lậu: True Visions
Channels	Thanh Hóa	Nghệ An	Hà Tĩnh	Quảng Bình	Quảng Trị

== South Central ==
Channels	South Central Region								
Channels	Thừa Thiên Huế	Đà Nẵng	Quảng Nam	Quảng Ngãi	Bình Định	Phú Yên	Khánh Hòa	Ninh Thuận	Bình Thuận
2			CCTV17; CCTV10						
3		CCTV5 (Trung Quốc)							
4							VTV1 (Cam Ranh)		
5				TV5 (sóng từ Philippines)	VTV2	TV5 (sóng từ Philippines)			
6	VTV3/Truyền hình A Lưới; TRT/VTV1/VTV3 (Nam Đông)		QRT; VTV3 VTV1/TH Bắc & Nam Trà My, Nông Sơn; VTV1/VTV3 (Nam Giang)	VTV3/PTQ1 (Đức Phổ) VTV2 VTV1 (Trà Bồng); VTV2 (Ba Tơ) VTV1 (Lý Sơn); PTQ1/VTV1/VTV3 (Sơn Hà); VTV2 (Tây Trà)	Quy Nhơn TV -> BTV; VTV3 (1996–2002); BTV/VTV1 (An Lão)	PTP/VTV3/TH Sơn Hòa?	VTV3 VTV3 (Cam Ranh)/TH Cam Ranh -> VTV1 VTV3 (Vạn Ninh)/TH Vạn Ninh; VTV1 (Khánh Sơn) VTV1	VTV3; VTV1	VTV1 (Lagi) VTV1/BTV Bình Thuận (Phú Quý) VTV3/TH Tánh Linh; HTV7
7	VTV3; HVTV (VTV Huế)	DRT1	TH Hội An/QRT; QRT/VTV1 (Cù Lao Chàm) QRT/VTV3/TH Duy Xuyên, Đại Lộc, Điện Bàn; VTV1 (Đông Giang, Hiệp Đức); VTV3 (Phước Sơn, Tây Giang)	Nghĩa Bình -> PTQ1 VTV1 PTQ1 (Ba Tơ); VTV3/PTQ (Sơn Tây)	BTV Bình Định (Hoài Nhơn, Tây Sơn, Vĩnh Thạnh); GMA (sóng từ Philippines)	PVTV (VTV Phú Yên); VTV2 (13h – 17h)	VTV2/KTV (Khánh Vĩnh); VTV3 (Khánh Sơn) KTV (Diên Khánh, Cam Lâm); VTV3/TH Ninh Hòa, Cam Lâm	GMA (sóng từ Philippines)	BTV Bình Thuận (Hàm Thuận Bắc)
8	TRT1 (A Lưới); VTV1 (Phú Lộc)	HTV7	QRT (Quế Sơn); VTV3/Tiên Phước	VTV2 PTQ (Trà Bồng) VTV2 (Lý Sơn) VTV1 (Ba Tơ); VTV1 (Tây Trà); VTV3 (Minh Long); VTV1/VTV3 (Sơn Hà)	BTV Hoài Nhơn; VTV2 (Núi Vũng Chua) VTV3 (Hoài Nhơn); VTV1 (An Lão)	VTV3 (Sơn Hoà)	VTV1/TH Vạn Ninh	VTV3	VTV1 VTV3/TH Phú Quý
9	VTV3/TH Nam Đông; VTV1 (Phú Lộc); HVTV (VTV Huế)	DVTV (VTV Đà Nẵng) VTV2 (Đà Nẵng) TH Đà Nẵng – Quảng Nam (cũ)	QRT (Bắc & Nam Trà My); VTV3 (Đông Giang); VTV1 (Nam Giang, Phước Sơn)	PTQ2; VTV1/VTV3/PTQ1 (Ba Tơ); VTV1/PTQ (Minh Long); VTV2 (Trà Bồng)	BTV Bình Định (TP Quy Nhơn, Hoài Nhơn); VTV3 (Vĩnh Thạnh); VTV2/VTV3 (An Lão)	VTV1	Nha Trang TV -> KTV; VTV3/TH Khánh Sơn; VTV1 (Cam Lâm)	NTV (Ninh Hải)	
10	VTV3/TRT (Phú Lộc)		VTV1 VTV3/TH Quế Sơn	VTV1; VTV3/TH Lý Sơn	BTV/VTV6 (Vũng Chúa) VTV3/BTV/TH An Nhơn; VTV3/BTV (Hoài Ân); VTV1/VTV3 (Vĩnh Thạnh); VTV2/VTV3/TH An Lão; BTV (Vân Canh)	VTV1 (Sông Cầu) TH Sông Cầu VTV2/VTV3/TH Sông Hinh + VTV Phú Yên; VTV3 (Đồng Xuân); VTV2/VTV8 (Sông Hinh)	GMA (sóng từ Philippines)	NTV Ninh Thuận; VTV1 (Phước Chiến – Ninh Hải); VTV3/TH Ninh Phước	VTV3; VTV1 (Phú Quý)
11	CCTV2 VTV1/TH Nam Đông, A Lưới	CCTV2?	VTV2; VTV3/TH Bắc Trà My; VTV3/TH Tây Giang	CCTV2; HTV7; PTQ1/VTV2 (Ba Tơ); VTV3 (Minh Long); VTV1/VTV3/PTQ1 (Sơn Tây)	VTV1 (Vĩnh Thạnh); VTV3/BTV/TH An Lão	VTV3	KTV (Khánh Sơn, Ninh Hòa)	VTV1/TH Bắc Ái	VTV1 (Bắc Bình)
12	TRT -> TRT2	VTV1	VTV3 (Bắc & Nam Trà My); VTV3/Nam Giang VTV2	PTQ2 VTV3/TH Trà Bồng; PTQ1 (Ba Tơ) VTV2 (sau này); VTV3 (cũ) PTQ1 (Lý Sơn); PTQ1/VTV1/3 (Sơn Hà); VTV3 (Minh Long); VTV1/PTQ (Sơn Hà)	VTV1; VTV1 (Tây Sơn); VTV1/VTV3 (Hoài Ân)	VTV1 VTV3/TH Sông Cầu VTV Phú Yên + VTV2 (Sông Cầu) VTV1 (Sông Hinh) PTP/VTV3/Đông Hòa; VTV1/2/3 (Đèo Cả, Đông Hòa); VTV1 (Đồng Xuân)	VTV1; VTV1 (Khánh Vĩnh); VTV3/ TH Cam Ranh	VTV3 (X.Vĩnh Hải, Ninh Hải) VTV1 (Phước Diêm); NTV (Bắc Ái, Phước Chiến); VTV1/VTV3 (Bắc Ái, Ninh Hải) VTV2	Thuận Hải (cũ) BTV Bình Thuận VTV1 (Tánh Linh, Bắc Bình)
19			HTV7						
20			HTV9	Cinemax, HBO, MAX, Cartoon Network (True Visions) & Một số kênh khác ở Thọ Lộc					
21	CCTV3; VTV3/TH Phú Lộc; TRT1 (Nam Đông)	VTV3		CCTV3; PTQ1 (Đức Phổ)	VTV3/TH Tây Sơn	VTV3	VTV1 (Ninh Hòa)	NTV (Ninh Sơn)	HTV7 (La Gi)
22	VTV1		QRT (Tây Giang)	VTV1/PTQ (Sơn Hà); PTQ1/VTV1 (Bình Sơn); VTV3 (Dung Quất)	BTV Bình Định (1 số nơi)	TV5 (sóng từ Philippines); VTV1 (Sơn Hòa)	VTV2; KTV2 KTV (Khánh Sơn)		VTV3 (Bắc Bình)
23	VTV2 (Phú Lộc)		VTV1	VTV2 (Ba Tơ); PTQ1 (Tây Trà)		VTV1 (Sông Cầu); VTV2		VTV3	VTV3
24	HTV7; TRT1 (Phú Lộc); VTV2 (Nam Đông)	DRT2; HTV9	Một số kênh truyền hình analog lậu tại TP Tam Kỳ	HTV9 (Mộ Đức); PTQ1 (Đức Phổ, Trà Bồng)	VTV2		KTV (Cam Ranh)		
25	VTV2 HVTV (VTV Huế)		Một số kênh truyền hình analog lậu tại TP Tam Kỳ ITV – VTC13; QRT (Phước Sơn)	VTV3 PTQ1/VTV2 (Bình Sơn); VTV1 (Dung Quất); VTV1/PTQ (Sơn Tây) HTV9	VTV1 (An Lão)	VTV3 -> VTV2 (Sông Hinh)		NTV (Phước Diêm)	VTV3 BTV Bình Thuận (Đảo Phú Quý) BTV Bình Thuận (Tánh Linh)
26	TRT1/VTV1 (Nam Đông); VTV8 (Nam Đông)	VTV2	VTV2; QRT (Bắc Trà My); QRT/VTV3 (Nông Sơn) VTC3	VTV3/VTV1/TH Ba Tơ	VTV1 -> VTV3/TH Vân Canh; VTV3/BTV (Hoài Ân)	GMA Channel (sóng từ Philippines)	VTV3 (Khánh Vĩnh)/TH Khánh Vĩnh; GMA Channel (sóng từ Philippines)		HTV9 -> VTV2
27			VTC5; QRT (Nam Trà My)	PTQ1 (Dung Quất); PTQ1/VTV3 (Bình Sơn); PTQ1 (Minh Long)	VTV3	VTV Phú Yên (Xuân Lộc, TX Sông Cầu)	VTV1 (Diên Khánh)	VTV2 (từ 2017)	
28	TRT1		HTV7; DRT2 (Hòa Vang) VTV6 (cũ)				VTV2 (Khánh Sơn); VTV3 (Khánh Vĩnh); VTV1 (Ninh Hòa)		VTV3; VTV1/3/BTV Bình Thuận (Hàm Tân)
29			VTC9	HTV7; VTV Huế	BTV Bình Định; VTV3/TH Tuy Phước; VTV3 -> VTV1 (Vân Canh); BTV/VTV1 (Tây Sơn)		VTV3 (Diên Khánh)	NTV (Phước Bình)	VTV3
30						VTV2 + VTV Phú Yên (Đồng Xuân)	KTV (Ninh Hòa)	NTV Ninh Thuận; VTV2	BTV Bình Thuận + VTV3 (Lagi); VTV1 (Tuy Phong, Đức Linh)
31			Đà Nẵng – Quảng Nam cũ QRT						BTV Bình Thuận
32		HTV9	HTV9/VTV3; VTV1/QRT (Nam Giang)	VTV3; BTV1 (Ba Tơ)	VTV3?		KTV (Diên Khánh)		
33		VTV5(Quảng Nam)	VTV3 VTV5						BTV Bình Thuận (Dốc Cúng, Tuy Phong)
34		VTV6					KTV/VTV2 (Khánh Vĩnh)		VTV2 (Phan Thiết) TH Đức Linh/BTV Bình Thuận BTV Bình Thuận (Lagi)/TH Lagi/VTV9/VTV1 VTV1 → VTV6 (Đức Linh); VTV3 (Đức Linh)
35	HTV9?	QRT (Bà Nà)	Đà Nẵng – Quảng Nam cũ QRT2 → QRT	VTV3					VTV3/TH Tuy Phong
36			ĐNRTV1 → VTV6						
37		VTV Đà Nẵng (Hòa Vang)	TH Đông Giang/VTV3/QRT THVL1 (Điện Bàn) DN2; QTV; VTV1/VTV3 (Đại Lộc)			PTP HTV7	VTV1 (Khánh Sơn)		BTV Bình Thuận (Lagi)
38		QRT/VTV3 (một huyện ở Quảng Nam) BTV2		VTV2 BTV1				VTV2	
39		DRT2	HGTV						
40		DRT1	VTV3 (Đông Giang)						BTV Bình Thuận (Đức Linh)
41		QRT (Hiệp Đức)			VTV6				
42			QRT						
43		VTV6	QRT VTV1/VTV3/TH Đại Lộc; VTV1/3/QRT (Điện Bàn)						
44		VTV3/TH Hòa Vang	KG; VTV1/VTV3/QRT (Tiên Phước)	HTV9 (Ba Tơ)	VTC1?				
45	CCTV1 (ven biển)	QRT (?)	QRT (Bà Nà) /CCTV1	CCTV1 (ven biển)	BTV Bình Định (Hoài Nhơn)		KTV (Cam Ranh)		
46	VTV2	VTV6 (cũ)	THTPCT	TRT1	VTC2; VTC9?		HTV7		
47		VTV6	VTV6 TH Núi Thành/VTV3/QRT	VTV1 (Ba Tơ)	VTV5/BTV (Vân Canh)				BTV Bình Thuận (Tánh Linh)
48			VTV3 (Thăng Bình) BTV2						
49		VTV1 (dự phòng)	VTV1; LA34 (Điện Bàn)	VTV1			HTV9		
50			CCTV1	HN1	VTC1; BTV (Tây Sơn)		KTV		HTV9/BTV Bình Thuận (Hàm Tân); BTV Bình Thuận (Hàm Thuận Nam)
51		VTC1; VTC5							
52									BTV Bình Thuận (Bắc Bình)
53		VTC2 →VTC9			VTC9; An Lão/VTV3		VTC1; VTV1 (Cam Lâm)		
54							KTV (Xã Vĩnh Lương, TP Nha Trang)		BTV Bình Thuận (Hàm Thuận Bắc)
55	VTC1	VTC2 → VTC9					VTC9; VTV3 (Cam Lâm)		
57		VTC9							
58	VTC9	VTC1					VTC1		
60									
61 – 69	Một số kênh lậu			Một số kênh lậu: 69: ESPN	Một số kênh analog lậu (từ 60 – 69 UHF): 62: HBO				
Channels	Thừa Thiên Huế	Đà Nẵng	Quảng Nam	Quảng Ngãi	Bình Định	Phú Yên	Khánh Hòa	Ninh Thuận	Bình Thuận

== Highland Central ==
Channels	Highland Central province				
Channels	Kon Tum	Gia Lai	Đắk Lắk	Đắk Nông	Lâm Đồng
2					VTV1 (Bảo Lộc)
3					VTV3/TH Bảo Lộc
5					VTV2 (Bảo Lộc)
6	Tây Nguyên → KRT + VTV1/VTV2/VTV3/VTV5 VTV1/VTV3 (Tư Mơ Rông)	VTV3/TH Ayun Pa, Đức Cơ; VTV1 (Chư Sê, Đức Cơ); THGL (Kong Chro, Krong Pa); VTV1/VTV3 (Kbang, Đắk Đoa); VTV1 (Chư Pưh); VTV2/3/TH Chư Prong; VTV1/THGL (Đắk Đoa)	VTV5/DRT (Đèo Hà Lan); VTV1 (M'Drak) VTV3/Buôn Hồ	HTV7 -> PTD; VTV3/VTV6	LTV VTV3/TH Lâm Hà VTV3 → LTV(Đạ Huoai); LTV (Cát Tiên) VTV3/TH Đạm Bri
7	VTV3/TH Đắk Tô; VTV1 (Kon Rẫy); VTV3/KRT (Ngọc Hồi)	VTV2; VTV1/THGL (Kong Chro); VTV3/TH Krong Pa; VTV1 (An Khê)	VTV3/TH Ea Súp, Krong Pắc; VTV1 (Krong Ana)	VTV3/TH Đắk R'Lấp, Đắk Mil; VTV1 (Đắk Song, Đắk Glong)	
8	VTV1/VTV2 (Sa Thầy)	VTV1/VTV3/Kbang; THGL (Chư Pưh); VTV1/THGL (Chư Prong); VTV3/TH Mang Yang; VTV1 (Ayun Pa); THGL/VTV1 (Krong Pa); VTV1/2/3 (Đức Cơ, Kong Chro); VTV3/THGL/TH Đức Cơ; VTV2 (Kong Chro)	Krong Pak, Eah'Leo, Krong Bong, M'Drak, Buôn Hồ/VTV3 & 1 số đài huyện VTV2; VTV1 (Lắk)	HTV9 -> VTV1; VTV3/TH Đắk Glong	LTV/VTV1/HTV7
9	VTV Đà Nẵng; VTV1/3/KRT (Đắk Hà); VTV3 (Ngọc Hồi); VTV3 (Đắk Giei); VTV1/VTV2 (Sa Thầy); VTV1/VTV3 (Tư Mơ Rông)	VTV1; VTV1/VTV3 (Kbang); VTV1/THGL (Chư Păh, Kong Chro, Chư Sê); VTV2 (Krong Pa)	DRT (chính) + VTV5/VTV3; VTV3 (Eakar)	HTV9 (Đắk Mil)	VTV1 VTV3/TH Lạc Dương
10	VTV2; VTV1 (Đắk Tô, Kon Plong); KRT (Sa Thầy); VTV3/TH Kon Rẫy	VTV3/TH Chư Sê; VTV3/TH Chư Păh, An Khê, Chư Prông; VTV1/THGL (Krong Pa)	Krong Nang, Lắk/VTV3; VTV1/VTV2; VTV2 (Eah'Leo)	VTV2; PTD	VTV2 VTV3/Đạ Huoai; VTV3/TH Bảo Lộc & huyện Lâm Hà; LTV (Lạc Dương); VTV1/TH Cát Tiên
11	VTV1/VTV3/Tu Mơ Rông VTV1/VTV3/Đắk Hà; VTV1/3/TH Kon Rẫy; VTV2 (Ngọc Hồi); VTV1/3/5 + TH Sa Thầy	THGL VTV1/VTV2/VTV3; VTV1/2/3 (Krong Pa)	VTV2 DVTV (VTV Đà Nẵng) VTV1 (Ea Súp, Krong Bông); VTV3/TH Eakar	VTV1 (Đắk R'Lấp); VTV1/VTV3 (Đắk Mil)	HTV9/LTV (trước 1984) VTV3 (Cầu Đất) VTV3/TH Cát Tiên VTV3/TH Đạ Tẻh; LTV (Đam Rông)
12	VTV2 (Đắk Tô); KRT (Đắk Giei); VTV3/TH Kon Plong; VTV3/TH Sa Thầy	DVTV (VTV Đà Nẵng) VTV3/TH Kbang, Kong Chro; VTV2 (An Khê); VTV1/THGL (Krong Pa)	VTV1 VTV3/M'Drak	VTV6; VTV3/một số huyện VTV1 (Đắk Mil, Đắk Glong)	VTV1/LTV (Đức Trọng) VTV3/LTV/TH TP Đà Lạt LTV (Đơn Dương) & VTV3/LTV/Đam Rông; LTV (Đạ Huoai); VTV1/VTV3 + TH Bảo Lâm
18		VTV5			
21	KRT/VTV1		VTV2/VTV1 (EaH'Leo)	VTV1	HTV7 (Cầu Đất – Đà Lạt)
22	VTV3 (Ngọc Hồi cũ)	VTV3/TH Ia Pa	VTV4; DRT (M'Drak); VTV4/Ea Súp		VTV5 (Di Linh) HTV7 (Bảo Lộc) VTV1 (Lạc Dương)
23	KRT/VTV3			VTV3/TH Đắk Mil	LTV (Bảo Lâm)
24		VTV2 (từ 2017)	VTV2	VTV3/TH Đức Trọng HTV9 (Cầu Đất) LTV/HTV9 (Bảo Lộc)	
25	KRT/VTV3 (Đắk Hà)	VTV3	VTV3/Eakar	VTV3/CRT (Cư Jút)	VTV2
26	VTV1				
27	VTV2 (Đắk Hà)			VTV3 PTD/VTV3 (Cư Jút)	LTV/VTV3 (Đạ Tẻh); VTV3/VTV4/VTV5/HTV9 + Di Linh; VTV1/VTV3 (Đơn Dương)
28	KRT (Kon Plong)	VTV2	VTV3		
29	VTV2 (Đăk Giei)			PTD (Krong No, Đắk Glong)	LTV (Di Linh)
30	VTV1/TH Tu Mơ Rông; KRT (Kon Rẫy); VTV1/VTV3/VTV5 (Sa Thầy)	THGL/VTV3 (Đắk Pơ)		VTV3/TH Đắk Glong, Krong Nô	DVTV (VTV Đà Nẵng)
31			VTV2	VTV3/PTD/TH Tuy Đức	
32	VTV1 (Đắk Giei); VTV2 (Tư Mơ Rông)	HTV7	VTV1 (Eah'Leo)		
33				VTV2 (Đắk Mil)	VTV1 (Lâm Hà)
34	VTV3 (Tư Mơ Rông)			PTD (Đắk Song); PTD	VTV9
35		HTV9			
36		VTC9; VTV3/Chư Pưh		VTV3/TH Tuy Đức	
37	VTV1 (Ngọc Hồi)				
38	VTV5		VTV3/VTV5/VTV6 (Buôn Ma Thuột)		
47			VTV2 (Krong Bong)		
48			HTV7; DRT (Krong Bông)		
49	VTV1 (Kon Plông)		VTV1 (Krong Bong); DRT (Krong Pac)		
50			VTV1 (Krong Bong)		
51	VTC1; KRT/VTV3 (Kon Plong)		HTV9 DRT (M'Drak); VTV3/TH Krong Ana; VTV1/2/3/DRT/TH Buôn Đôn; VTV2 (Krong Bong)		VTC1
52			VTC1; VTV2 (Krong Bong)		
53	VTC2/VTC9		DRT (huyện Lắk); VTV3 (Krong Bong)		VTC2 → VTC9
54			DRT (Ea'Hleo); VTV3 (Krong Bong)		
55			DRT (Ea Súp, Krong Bong)		
56			DRT/VTV (Krong Bong)		
57	VTV3	VTC1 VTC5	VTC2 →VTC9		
60–69		Một số kênh lậu ở Gia Lai			Một số kênh lậu ở Lâm Đồng (True Visions)
Kênh	Kon Tum	Gia Lai	Đắk Lắk	Đắk Nông	Lâm Đồng

== Southeast ==
Channel	Southeast Province					
Channel	Bình Phước	Bà Rịa Vũng Tàu	Bình Dương	TPHCM	Tây Ninh	Đồng Nai
3				OPT1 (Liên Xô cũ)		
4						HTV7 (Núi Chứa Chan, Xuân Lộc)
5	TV5 (Cambodia)				TV5 (Cambodia)	HTV9 (Núi Chứa Chan, Xuân Lộc)
6	VTV3 (Bà Rá, trước 2004); BPTV6 →BPTV2	BPTV6 →BPTV2	CVTV1; BPTV6 →BPTV2			BPTV6 →BPTV2
7	HTV7					
8	VTV1 THSB → BPTV (cũ) VTV1/BPTV (từ 4 – 9/2004); BPTV2	BRT; CĐTV (Côn Đảo)	THVL2			
9	HTV9					
10	BPTV1; TH Bù Đăng, Lộc Ninh		THKG10 (KG)			VTV1 (Núi Chứa Chan, Xuân Lộc)
11	TTV11	TH Đặc khu Vũng Tàu – Côn Đảo -> BRT	TTV11	TTV11	TTV11	
12	ĐNRTV→ ĐN2 THSB/BPTV; BPTV3/HTV7 (trước 2008); BPTV3/VTV6 -> VTV2	ĐNRTV→ ĐN2; BTV Bình Thuận		ĐN2; BTV (Bình Thuận)	ĐNRTV → ĐN2; OPT1 (Liên Xô cũ, đến 1991)	ĐNRTV → ĐN2 (từ 26 April 2003) BTV (Bình Thuận)
21	VTV1 (Bình Dương)			VTV3 (trước 2002); VTV1 (Bình Dương)	VTV3 (TP.HCM); VTV1 (An Thạnh, Bình Dương)	VTV1 (Bình Dương)
22		VTV1 (Mỏ dầu Bạch Hổ)			VTV1 (Núi Bà Đen)	
23	VTV2; BPTV4 (cũ) -> VTV3	VTV1 (Côn Đảo); VTV1/2/3 (Côn Đảo)	THBT			
24		VTV3		VTV4		
25	BPTV25→BPTV1	OPT1 (Mỏ dầu Bạch Hổ)	VTC1; VTC5 (Bình Dương); BPTV25→BPTV1	HTV7 (Sunwah Tower); BPTV25 → BPTV1	VTC1; VTC5 (Bình Dương)	VTC1; VTC5 (Bình Dương) VTV1 (Định Quán); BPTV25→BPTV1
26		BRT (Côn Đảo); VTV Cần Thơ 1 (Núi Thánh Giá, Côn Đảo)	THTG			VTV2 (Định Quán)
27		HTV3 (TPHCM); BRT (Châu Đức)	HTV3			
28	VTV3 (Bình Dương)			VTV1 (trước 2002); VTV3 (An Thạnh, Bình Dương)	VTV3 (An Thạnh, Bình Dương)	VTV3 (Bình Dương)
29		VTV2 (Côn Đảo)		THĐT1		
30				HTV2		
31		BRT (Côn Đảo)	THVL1			ĐN1 (Thống Nhất)
32	VTV3/TH Bù Gia Mập	VTV2 (Bình Dương/TPHCM)	VTV2 (Bình Dương/TPHCM); LA34 (từ 2014)			VTV2 (Bình Dương/TPHCM)
33		VTV3/CĐTV (Côn Đảo)		BLTV		ĐN3
34		LA34				ĐN4; LA34
35	VTV3 (Bà Rá); BPTV5 (cũ); BPTV1 (Note: Phát sóng từ tháng 6 năm 2014)	HTV4	THTV; HTV4	HTV4; THTV	HTV4	HTV4 VTV3 (Định Quán)
36	DN1	DN1 BRT (Bến Dầm, & TT Côn Đảo thuộc Côn Đảo)	DN1			
37				Disney (Gò Vấp)		
38		VTV1	VTC7 (Bình Dương)	VTC7 (Bình Dương); Star Movies/HBO (Gò Vấp)		VTV6 (Định Quán); VTC7 (Bình Dương)
39				VTC7; DVTV (Linh Xuân)		
40	VTV2 (Bình Dương) -> BTV2	VTV2 (Bình Dương) -> BTV2 VTV1 (Cỏ Ống, Côn Đảo); BRT (Cỏ Ống, Côn Đảo)	VTV2 (An Thạnh, Bình Dương) -> BTV2			
41		BRT				
42		VTV9				
43		VTV3 (Mỏ dầu Bạch Hổ)	THTPCT			VTV6 (Định Quán)
44	BTV1					
45						DN1 (Núi Chứa Chan)
46			HTV1; VTV2	VTV2 (Bình Dương)		
47				LA34 (Vĩnh Hưng)		
48		VTV2; BRT (Côn Đảo)	VTV6 (TPHCM/ An Thạnh – Bình Dương)			VTV6 (TPHCM/An Thạnh, Bình Dương)
49			VTV Cần Thơ 1 (từ 2010)			
51		VTC2→ VTC9 (TPHCM)	VTC2→ VTC9 (TPHCM); CVTV2			
52		VTC7 (TPHCM)	VTC2 → VTC9	VTC7; VTC2→ VTC9 (Bình Dương)		
53						HTV7 (Định Quán)
54	VTC5; VTC1 (TPHCM)					
57						HTV9 (Định Quán)
58			VTC1 (TPHCM)			
60				VTC1; VTV1 (Saigon Centre)		
61		VTV2				
62				VTV3 (Saigon Centre)		
Kênh	Bình Phước	Bà Rịa Vũng Tàu	Bình Dương	TPHCM	Tây Ninh	Đồng Nai

== Southwest (Mekong River Delta) ==
Channels	Southwest Province												
Channels	Long An	Tiền Giang	Bến Tre	Đồng Tháp	Vĩnh Long	Cần Thơ	Hậu Giang	Trà Vinh	Sóc Trăng	Bạc Liêu	Cà Mau	Kiên Giang	An Giang
3						THCT3; HTV7							HTV7 (Núi Sam, Châu Đốc)
5	TV5 (Cambodia)				TV5 (Cambodia)							TV5 (Cambodia)	
6	CVTV1/VTV3 (Cần Thơ)										CVTV1/VTV3 (Cần Thơ)	CVTV1/VTV3 VTV1 (Phú Quốc)	CVTV1/VTV3 (Cần Thơ)
7	HTV7/TVK					THCT (cũ)	THCT (cũ)		HTV7			VTC1? VTV3 (Phú Quốc); VTV1/VTV3 (Gành Dầu, An Thới – Phú Quốc); VTV1/VTV3/KG (Hà Tiên)	TVK
8	THVL8→THVL2 CTV8→CTV1 ATV2									CTV8→CTV1		CTV8→CTV1 VTV3/TH Phú Quốc; VTV2?/KG (Hà Tiên)	THVL8→THVL2 CTV8→CTV1 ATV2
9	HTV9/CTV9											CTV9	CTV9
10	THKG10→ KG	THKG10→KG THVL3; VTV6 (Vĩnh Long)	THKG10→KG	THKG10 -> KG THVL3; VTV6 (Vĩnh Long); THĐT (trước 1991)		THKG10→KG HTV7 THVL3; VTV6	THKG10→KG HTV7	THKG10→KG	THKG10→KG STV3/VTV3	THKG10 → KG		THKG10 -> KG; TH Phú Quốc/VTV3/Nhân Dân TV (từ 2016?); VTV3 (Hòn Thơm & Bãi Thơm – Phú Quốc)	THKG10 -> KG
11	TTV11; TV11→THTV; Apsara TV				TV11→THTV; THTPCT (THCT)	THTPCT (THCT cũ) (Cái Răng); TV11 -> THTV	THTPCT (THCT cũ); TV11 -> THTV	TV11 -> THTV		VTV2 TH Minh Hải→ BLTV TV11→THTV	TV11→THTV	VTC9? KG (Phú Quốc)	HTV9/VTV Cần Thơ 2 (Núi Sam); THTPCT (THCT); Apsara TV
12	ĐNRTV→ĐNRTV2 CTV2; VTV3/VTV5 (Cà Mau)	VTV2 (Cần Thơ) Cửu Long→THVL CTV2; VTV3/VTV5 (Cà Mau) TH Minh Hải→ BLTV THTG2; HTV7	VTV2 (Cần Thơ) Cửu Long → THVL CTV2; VTV3/VTV5 (Cà Mau) TH Minh Hải→ BLTV				VTV2 TH Minh Hải→ BLTV CTV2; VTV3/VTV5 (Cà Mau)	CTV2; VTV3/VTV5 (Cà Mau) TH Minh Hải→ BLTV			CTV2; VTV3/VTV5	CTV2; VTV3/VTV5 (Cà Mau) KG/VTV3/VTV1 (An Sơn – Kiên Hải) KG/VTV3 (Hà Tiên)	ATV1/VTV3/Tân Châu; VTV3/TH Tịnh Biên
15					HTV9 (cũ)								HTV9 (Cần Thơ cũ)
21	VTV1 (Bình Dương); VTV3 (TPHCM)	VTV1 (Bình Dương)		VTV1 (BD); STV1	VTV Cần Thơ 1			STV1 (cũ)		VTV3; STV1 (cũ)			CTN (Cambodia)
22		VTV6 (Cần Thơ)						STV1 (Sóc Trăng, 2016) VTV6 (Cần Thơ)		STV1 (Sóc Trăng, 2016)			VTV6 (Cần Thơ)
23	THBT/VTV3							THBT/VTV3				VTV1; KG (Phú Quốc); HTV9 (Phú Quốc)	
24							VTV1 (AG)						VTV1 (Núi Cấm)
25	BPTV1; STV1 Hang Meas/TVK (Campuchia)	STV1	STV1	STV1 Hang Meas/TVK (Campuchia)	STV1						STV1 (1 số vùng)	Hang Meas/TVK (Campuchia)	STV1; Hang Meas/TVK (Campuchia)
26	CTN (Cambodia); THTG	THTG	THTG										THTG; CTN (Cambodia)
27	HTV3 (TPHCM)									VTV1		VTV2 (Phú Quốc); HTV9 (Phú Quốc)	HTV7 (Châu Đốc)
28	VTV3 (BD)											VTV3	
29	THDT1			THDT1 MyTV (Cambodia)		THDT1						THDT1 MyTV (Cambodia)	
30	HTV2 (TPHCM)											VTV1 (Hòn Me)	
31	THVL1 SEATV (Cambodia)		THVL1	THVL1 SEATV (Campuchia)		THVL1						THVL1	THVL1; SEATV (Campuchia)
32	LA34	LA34/BayonTV (Cam)						BLTV Bạc Liêu (từ 5.2014)			BLTV (từ 5.2014); HTV9 (Trần Văn Thời)	VTV2 (Hòn Me)	BayonTV (Cam)
33	BLTV Bạc Liêu /TV3 (Cam)												
34	LA34							LA34				VTV1/VTV3 (Hòn Me)	LA34
35	HTV4/THTV			CNCTV	/THTV	HTV4/THTV	THTV						
36	ATV1/DNRTV1			THAG →ATV1								THAG →ATV1	
37		VTV1 (Bến Tre)						VTV1 (Bến Tre)					
38													TH An Phú/VTV3
39											VTV1		
40	BTV2/VTV2		VTV2	BTV2; VTV2 (Bến Tre)									
41	BRT			VTV3 (An Giang)									VTV3 (Núi Cấm)
42											VTV3		
43	THTPCT												THTPCT
44	BTV1			HTV7/BTV1	HTV7 (Cần Thơ)						VTV2	HTV7 (Cần Thơ)	
45								VTV1					
46	HTV1/VTV2			VTV1 (Cần Thơ)/HTV1								CTV8 (Cambodia)	VTV1 (Cần Thơ) CTV8 (Cambodia)
47	LA34 (Vĩnh Hưng).....I. Truyền dẫn phát sóng: 1.Phát hình: –  Kênh 34 UHF đặt tại 125 QL 1A, phường 4, TP. Tân An tỉnh Long An.; –  Kênh 47 UHF đặt tại thị trấn huyện Vĩnh Hưng tỉnh Long An.....	VTV3 (TP Bến Tre)							VTV2 (TP Bạc Liêu)		VTV1 (Hà Tiên)		
48	CTV8 (Cam)			HTV9 (Cần Thơ)	CTV8 (Cam)	TH Châu Đốc; VTV3 HTV9 (Cần Thơ)	HTV9 (Cần Thơ)						CTV8 (Cam) TH Châu Đốc /VTV3 HTV9 (CT)
49		VTV3 → VTV Cần Thơ 1											VTV3 (CT) → VTVCT1
50									VTV1 VTV2 STV2				
51	VTC9 TPHCM CVTV2/VTV5 TNB	CVTV2/VTV5 TNB											CVTV2/VTV5 TNB
52			VTV3							VTV2; VTV3			
53						VTC1; VTV2 (cũ)							VTV2 (Núi Cấm)
55	BTV News (Cam)				BTV News (Cam)				HGTV/VTV1/VTV3?		STV2 (sau 2015)		BTV News (Cam)
56		HGTV		PNN (Cambodia)		HGTV							PNN (Cambodia) HTV9; VTVCT1/ VTV9 (Núi Sam)
57													
58		VTV6 (Cần Thơ)										VTV6 (Cần Thơ)	VTV3/TH Tri Tôn
60		VTC5; VTC1 (Cần Thơ)											VTC5; VTC1 (Cần Thơ)
61		VTC9 (Cần Thơ)											VTC9 (Cần Thơ)
62	VTV3 (TPHCM)												
63–69	Một số kênh analog lậu: 68: TV5Monde (Pháp)												
Channels	Long An	Tiền Giang	Bến Tre	Đồng Tháp	Vĩnh Long	Cần Thơ	Hậu Giang	Trà Vinh	Sóc Trăng	Bạc Liêu	Cà Mau	Kiên Giang	An Giang

== Other ==
- Some places broadcast channels from 63 – 69UHF, mainly channels that are illegally broadcast via analog (such as in Ninh Binh, Binh Dinh, Gia Lai, Quang Nam....). Some other smuggled channels also broadcast on frequency channels from 6 VHF – 62 UHF (such as in Ninh Binh, Ha Tay, Quang Nam, Quang Ngai...)
- Frequency channels from 13 VHF – 20 UHF are for military television programs of some provinces/city (such as Ninh Binh, Thai Binh....).

== See also ==
- List of analog television stations in Vietnam
- List of radio stations in Vietnam
- List of digital television stations in Vietnam
- List of television channels in Vietnam

== Comment ==
Comment
Note when viewing the article:	Notes
Channel (local (district/province) )	Channel + transmitting/receiving station in district/province (set by locality/THVN Radio.
Channel + Television (TH) district (province)	Channel + broadcasting station (with district television program (belonging to province) on the frequency channel of the channel that the district television station continues to broadcast.
Channel (nothing)	The channel broadcasts at the main station of the same province (usually located in province capital/mountain), including the transmitter of the channel of Vietnam Television
Some special cases: Foreign channel; Other channels in other provinces (not VTV).	See (note ref ) next to it.
⚠Note: The station name can also be the name of the province/district.
