= List of digital television stations in Vietnam =

Digital TV Standards around the world.

This is the list of the stations on digital television in Vietnam. The channels that are available to viewers depends on the location.

The current DVB-T2 television system is being used to broadcast television on the UHF band nationwide, with the participation of transmission providers: VTV, SDTV, VTC, AVG and DTV, on frequencies from E21–E48.

== A brief outline of the TV digitization project ==
On December 27, 2011, Prime Minister Nguyen Tan Dung issued Decision No. 2451/QD-TTg approving the "Decision No. 2451/QD-TTg" project to digitize transmission and broadcast terrestrial television until 2020". The project officially started on April 1, 2014.

=== Route ===
To implement the digitization plan, provinces and cities are divided into 4 groups on the basis of socio-economic development level, radio transmission conditions and local frequency allocation capability. Each stage of television digitization will be done with each of these groups. However, compared to the original schedule, the time to stop broadcasting analogue terrestrial television in some localities has been delayed for some time due to difficulties in preparation and implementation.

Group	Cities and provinces	Digitalization completion time	
Group	Cities and provinces	Expected	Reality
I	Hanoi (old), Ho Chi Minh, Hai Phong, Da Nang, Can Tho	December 31, 2015	November 1, 2015 (Da Nang); August 15, 2016 (remaining cities)
II	Hanoi (expansion), Vinh Phuc, Bac Ninh, Hai Duong, Hung Yen, Quang Ninh, Thai Nguyen, Thái Bình, Ha Nam, Nam Dinh, Ninh Binh, Bac Giang, Phu Tho, Khanh Hoa, Binh Thuan, Binh Duong, Dong Nai, Ba Ria - Vung Tau, Long An, Tien Giang, Ben Tre, Vinh Long, Dong Thap, An Giang, Hau Giang	December 31, 2016	December 30, 2016 (Bac Ninh, Hung Yen, Hai Duong, Ha Nam, Vinh Phuc, Binh Duong, Vinh Long, Hau Giang); August 15, 2017 (Nam Dinh, Thai Binh, Long An, Ben Tre, Dong Thap, An Giang, Tien Giang; main broadcasting station); June 30, 2020 (Quang Ninh, Thai Nguyen, Ninh Binh, Bac Giang, Phu Tho, Dong Nai, Binh Thuan, Ba Ria - Vung Tau, Khanh Hoa)
III	Thanh Hoa, Nghe An, Ha Tinh, Quang Binh, Quang Tri, Thua Thien Hue, Quang Nam, Quang Ngai, Binh Dinh, Phu Yen, Lam Dong, Binh Phuoc, Tay Ninh, Tra Vinh, Soc Trang, Bac Lieu, Ca Mau, Kien Giang, Ninh Thuan (Note: Originally located in group II according to the digitization plan.)	December 31, 2018	December 31, 2017 (Binh Phuoc, Tra Vinh, Soc Trang, Bac Lieu, Ca Mau, Kien Giang); October 9, 2018 (Tay Ninh); June 30, 2020 (remaining provinces)
IV	Ha Giang, Cao Bang, Bac Kan, Tuyen Quang, Lao Cai, Yen Bai, Lang Son, Dien Bien, Lai Chau, Son La, Hoa Binh, Kon Tum, Gia Lai, Dak Lak, Dak Nong	December 31, 2020	December 28, 2020

=== Result ===
At the press conference taking place on January 11, 2021, Minister of Information and Communications Nguyen Manh Hung announced that Vietnam has completed the shutdown of terrestrial analogue television and officially completed the project of terrestrial television digitization. Through the digitization of terrestrial television, Vietnam has:

- Released 112 MHz on the band 700 MHz, which is the band with the best coverage today for 5G mobile communications nationwide.
- Expanded digital terrestrial TV coverage to 80% of the population, compared to 50% of the population in 2011.
- Attracted social resources to cover terrestrial digital television.
- Organized and arrange all local radio and television stations in the direction of specialization and professionalism, focusing on producing program content and hiring transmission and broadcasting services.

In the world, Vietnam ranks 78th out of 193 countries that have completed turning off analogue terrestrial television.

=== Channels broadcasting (Free to Air in the country) ===
- VTV1 HD
- VTV2 HD
- VTV3 HD
- VTV4 HD (Northern Delta)
- VTV5 HD
- VTV Can Tho
- VTV7 HD (Northern Delta)
- VTV8 HD
- VTV9 HD
- VTV Test 1 (Southern)
- VTV Test 2 (Southern)
- VTV4 SD
- VTV7 SD
- VTV5 Mekong Delta HD
- VTV5 Central Highland (Dak Lak)
- Local channel (TH TRA VINH 2, Ha Nam, Ninh Binh...)

==== VTC ====
- VTC1 HD
- VTC2
- VTC3 HD
- VTC4
- VTC5
- VTC TEST
- VTC7 HD
- VTC8
- VTC9 HD
- VTC10
- VTC6 HD
- VTC12
- VTC13 HD
- VTC14 HD
- VOVTV HD
- VTC16 HD
- HTV7 HD
- HTV9 HD
- Dong Nai 1
- Hai Phong HD
- Thai Binh HD
- Thanh Hoa HD
- VTC11
- QPVN
- THVL1 HD
- THVL2 HD
- THVL3 HD
- Local Channel
- VOV1 (Radio)
- VOV3 (Radio)

==== SDTV ====
===== South Central and Highlands Central =====
LCN (E36)	Channel Name
1	HTV7 HD
2	HTV9
3	HTVC Shopping
4	HTV2
5	HTV3
6	HTV Sports
7	Vinh Long 1 HD
8	Vinh Long 2 HD
9	BTV11
10	Vnews - TTXVN
11	TTV11 Tay Ninh
12	Danang 1 HD
13	Danang 2 HD
14	KTV Khanh Hoa
15	Binh Dinh TV
16	Lam Dong TV
17	Quang Nam TV
18	Can Tho TV
19	Dong Thap 1

===== Con Dao Island =====
LCN (E35)	Channel Name
1	Ba Ria - Vung Tau TV
2	VTV1
3	VTV3
4	HTV7
5	Kien Giang TV
6	VTC1
7	VTC14
8	Vinh Long TV1
9	ANTV
10	QPVN
11	HTV9
12	Tien Giang TV
13	An Giang TV

===== Southeast Region and Southwest Region (Mekong Delta) =====
LCN (E33, E34)	Channel Name
1	HTV9
2	HTV7 HD
3	HTVC Shopping
4	Vnews
5	Can Tho TV HD
6	HCATV5
7	Tay Ninh TV HD
8	HTV Key
9	Dong Thap TV1
10	Binh Duong TV1
11	Ba Ria - Vung Tau TV
12	Bac Lieu TV HD
13	HTV Sports
14	Long An TV
15	Soc Trang TV2
16	Binh Phuoc TV1 HD
17	Dong Thap TV2
18	Binh Thuan TV
19	Vinh Long TV1 HD
20	Vinh Long TV2 HD
21	Vinh Long TV3 HD
22	Vinh Long TV4 HD
23	An Giang TV
24	Ca Mau TV HD
25	Hau Giang TV HD
26	Kien Giang TV
27	Soc Trang TV 1
28	Tien Giang TV HD
29	Tra Vinh TV HD

==== DTV (Red River Delta and Northeast, Northwest Region) ====
LCN (E34 (Hoa Binh), E46, 47 & 48)	Channel name
1	Hanoi TV1 HD (Hanoi)
2	THP+ (Hai Phong)
3	SCTV5
4	VTVCab 11
5	TTXVN
6	THHN (Ha Nam TV)
7	Thai Nguyen 1 TV HD
8	Quang Ninh 1 TV HD
9	Quang Ninh 3 TV
10	Thai Binh TV HD
11	Hoa Binh TV HD
12	Vinh Phuc TV HD
13	Phu Tho TV

== DVB-T frequency in localities (defunct) ==
DVB-T frequency table in localities across the country (Channel: UHF (E)/VHF (R))
Provence/City	Frequency
An Giang	
Bạc Liêu	
Bà Rịa - Vũng Tàu	VTC: 29, 31
Bắc Kạn	VTC: 11, 13 -> 22, 23 (Nà Rì)
Bắc Ninh	
Bình Dương	BTV: 50, 53
Bình Định	VTC: 29, 30
Bình Phước	VTC: 29, 30
Bình Thuận	VTC: 34, 36 -> 36, 37; BTV Bình Thuận: 43
Cà Mau	VTC: 35, 36
Cao Bằng	VTC: 29, 30
Cần Thơ	VTC: 30, 55 -> 38, 54
Đà Nẵng	VTC: 36, 37 -> 29, 30
Điện Biên	
Đắk Lắk	VTC: 35, 36
Đắk Nông	
Đồng Nai	
Đồng Tháp	VTC: 56, 57
Gia Lai	
Hà Giang	VTC: 29, 30; HTV Ha Giang: 15
Hà Nam	
Hà Nội	Hanel: 47; VTC: 26 -> 29, 34
Hà Tĩnh	VTC: 7, 8 (Kỳ Anh)
Hải Dương	
Hải Phòng	VTC: 29, 30
Hậu Giang	
Hòa Bình	VTC: 6, 7
Hồ Chí Minh	VTC: 25, 60 -> 55, 56; HTV: 30 -> 39 -> 25
Hưng Yên	
Khánh Hòa	VTC: 35, 36
Kiên Giang	VTC: 25, 26 -> 41, 42
Kon Tum	
Lai Châu	
Lạng Sơn	VTC: 29, 30
Lào Cai	VTC: 29, 30
Lâm Đồng	VTC: 29, 30
Long An	
Nam Định	
Nghệ An	VTC: 35, 36; VTC (Đô Lương): 31, 32; VTC (Quỳnh Lưu): 9, 12
Ninh Bình	VTC: 29, 30
Ninh Thuận	VTC: 35, 36
Phú Thọ	VTC: 8, 9 (Thanh Ba)
Quảng Bình	VTC: 35, 36 -> 30, 31 -> 35
Quảng Nam	
Quảng Ngãi	VTC: 29, 30
Quảng Ninh	VTC: 6, 9 VTC (Móng Cái): 11, 12
Quảng Trị	VTC: 35, 36
Sóc Trăng	VTC: 41, 42
Sơn La	VTC: 29, 30; VTC (Mộc Châu): 21, 22
Tây Ninh	
Thái Bình	VTC: 29, 30
Thái Nguyên	VTC: 29, 30; VTC (Định Hóa): 11, 12
Thanh Hóa	VTC: 35, 36
Thừa Thiên Huế	VTC: 33, 34
Tiền Giang	
Trà Vinh	
Tuyên Quang	VTC: 41, 42; VTC (Chiêm Hóa): 41, 42
Vĩnh Long	VTC: 53, 55
Vĩnh Phúc	
Yên Bái	VTC: 29, 30; VTC (Nghĩa Lộ): 21, 22

=== Channels ===
==== VTC Foreign channels (defunct) ====
- Super Sports 3
- Australia Network
- True Sports
- Channel News Asia
- CCTV3
- CCTV4
- CCTV5
- CCTV8
- CCTV9
- Russia Today
- CNN
- BBC World News
- DW.TV
- Euronews
- Animal Planet
- Channel V China
- MTV Europe
- Arirang
- Fashion TV
- Cartoon Network
- Discovery Channel
- Cinemax
- TV5 Monde
- HBO
- OPT1
- Star Sports
- National Geographic Channel

==== VTC Domestic ====
- VTV1
- VTV2 (defunct)
- VTV3 (defunct)
- VTV4 (defunct)
- Hanoi TV
- Hanoi TV2
- HTV2 (defunct)
- HTV7 (defunct)
- HTV9 (defunct)
- HTVC Thuần Việt (defunct)
- Vietnamnet TV
- VTC1
- VTC2
- VTC3
- VTC4
- VTC5
- VTC6
- VTC7
- VTC8
- VTC9
- VTC10
- VTC11
- VTC12
- VTC13
- VTC14
- VTC16
- THVL1 (defunct)
- NTV Nghe An (defunct)
- TTV Thanh Hoa (defunct)
- THP Hai Phong (defunct)
- KG1 Kien Giang (defunct)
- QTV1 Quang Ninh (defunct)
- MTV Vietnam
- VOVTV
- QPVN
- Quoc Hoi
- SCTV5 (defunct)
- SCTV10
- VGS Shop
- VOV1
- VOV3

==== Hanel (defunct) ====
- VTV3
- HanoiTV
- Hanel TV channel

==== HTV (30 -> 39 -> 25 UHF) (defunct) ====
- HTV1
- HTV2
- HTV3
- HTV4
- HTV7
- HTV9
- VTV1
- VTV3

==== BTV Digital (50, 53 UHF) (defunct) ====
- BTV1
- BTV2
- BTV3
- BTV4
- BTV5
- BTV6
- BTV7
- BTV8
- BTV9
- Super Sports
- Super Sports Gold
- VTC1
- VTC2
- ESPN
- Star Sports
- HBO
- Cinemax
- Discovery Channel
- MTV Asia
- VTV1
- VTV2
- VTV3
- VTV4
- VTV6
- HTV7
- CCTV9
- Animal Planet
- CNN
- DW.TV
- Super Sports Gold
- Cartoon Network
- TV5 Monde
- CCTV4
- Hanoi TV1

== See also ==
- Television and mass media in Vietnam
- DVB-T2
- Vietnam Television
- List of analog television stations in Vietnam
