= Gilchrist State Forest =

State Forest in Klamath County, Oregon, United States

Coordinates: 43.45080°N 121.7035°W

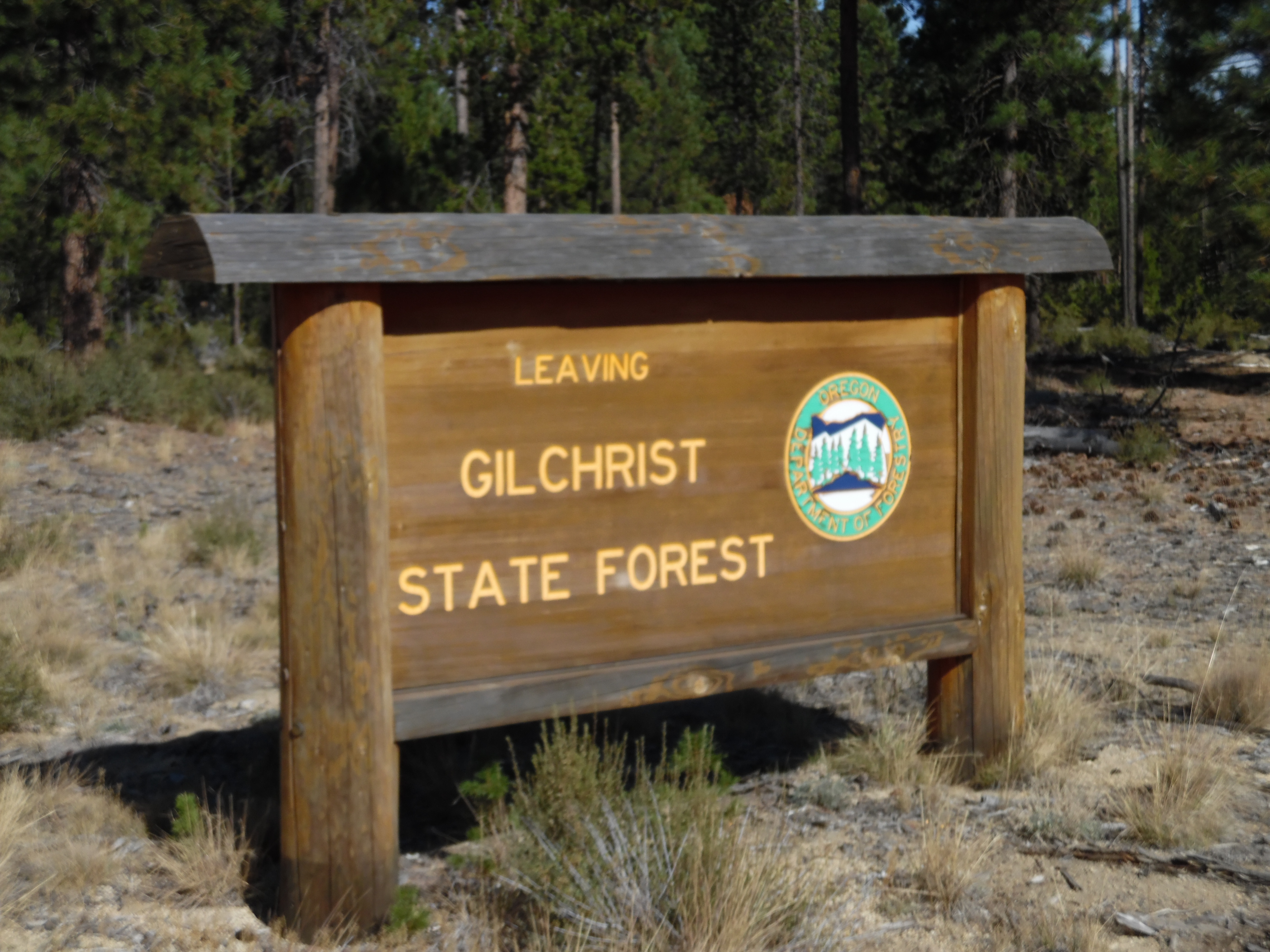
- Forest sign along U.S. Route 97
- Interactive map of Gilchrist State Forest
- Type: State forest
- Location: Klamath County, Oregon, United States
- Area: 70,000 acres (280 km^{2})
- Operator: Oregon Department of Forestry

Gilchrist State Forest is the sixth and newest state forest in the U.S. state of Oregon. The forest is located in northern Klamath County near the community of Gilchrist and was officially dedicated on June 11, 2010. The forest sits along U.S. Route 97 and is 70,000 acres (28,000 ha) in size.

== History ==
Originally owned by the Gilchrist family and their logging company, the land in what became the state forest was sold to Crown Pacific Partners in 1991. Crown Pacific Partners struggled financially under a large debt load and filed for bankruptcy in June 2003. Creditors took over their remaining assets in December 2004 and created Cascade Timberlands, LLC. Fidelity National Timber Resources purchased the forests that became the state forest from Cascade Timberlands in 2006, with Fidelity being a subsidiary of Fidelity National Financial.

The Oregon Board of Forestry approved the purchase of 43,000 acres (17,000 ha) of the Fidelity lands in Central Oregon in February 2010. The $15 million deal was for land with young pine trees, and was designed in part to prevent future development of the area. Fidelity's CEO at the time was developer Bill Foley, whose holdings included Whitefish Mountain Resort in Montana. Oregon Lottery funds were to be used to secure bonds for the purchase of the land. The deal was finalized in March 2010, and the state of Oregon took title to the lands that month.

Additionally, the non-profit group The Conservation Fund was to buy 25,000 acres (10,000 ha) of adjacent land to prevent its development and eventually sell to the state once state funds became available. Both the state owned lands and the non-profit owned lands were to be managed by the state as the 70,000-acre (28,000 ha) Gilchrist State Forest. The timber on the lands will not be large enough to harvest for several decades, as the land was logged in the early 1990s. Once logging resumes, the majority of the revenues will go to Klamath County. A dedication ceremony to officially open the new state forest took place on June 11, 2010.

== Description ==
Gilchrist State Forest is about 45 miles (72 km) south of the city of Bend along U.S. Route 97. It consists mainly of young lodgepole and ponderosa pine trees. Once mature, an estimated 13 million board feet of timber should be logged each year. Gilchrist is the first Oregon state forest dedicated since 1948 when Sun Pass State Forest opened.

== See also ==
- List of Oregon state forests
