= Wood River Wetland =

Wetland in Oregon, United States

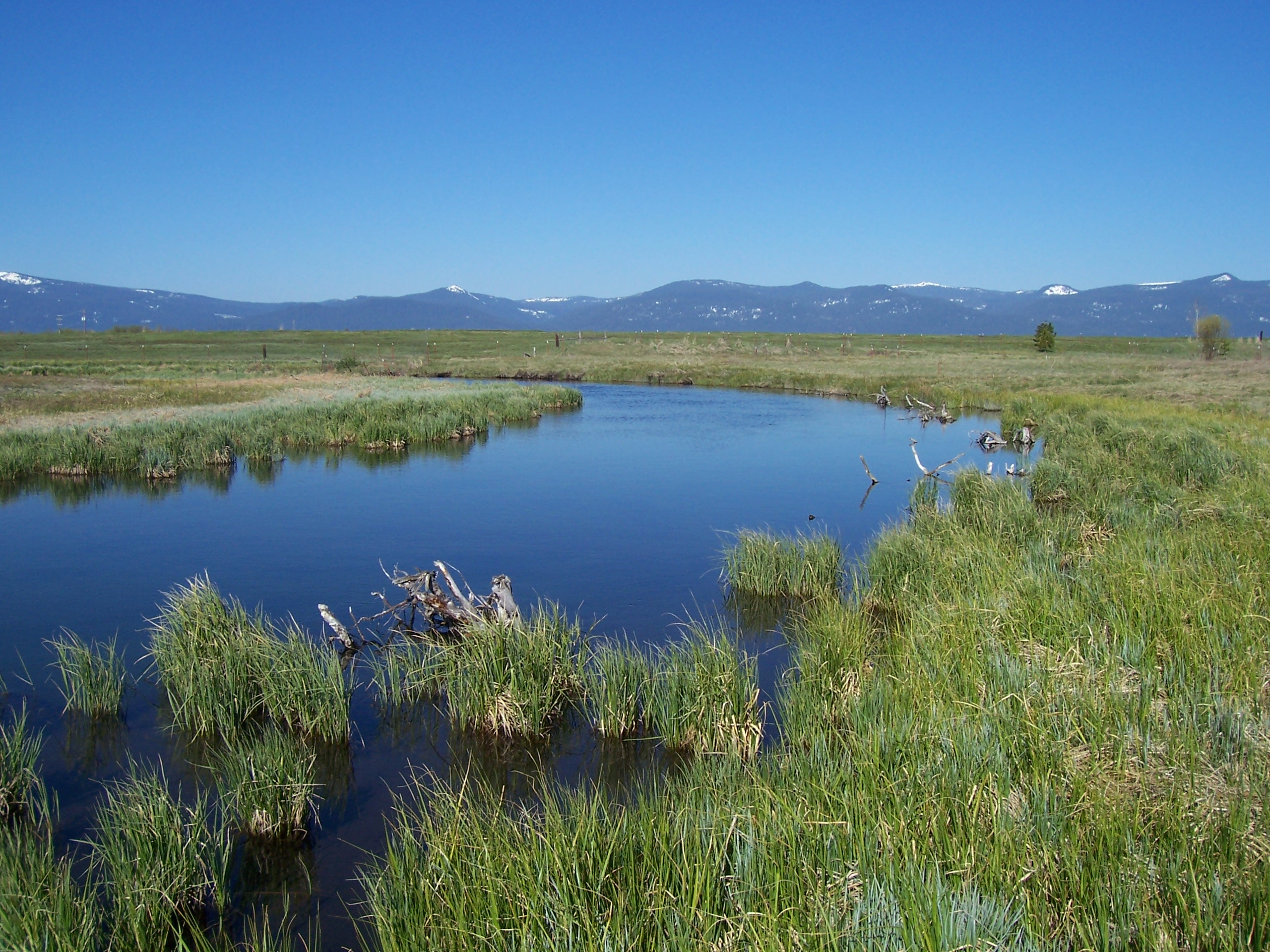
- Wood River Marsh at the Wetland

- Wood River wetland is located in Oregon
- Location: Chiloquin, Oregon
- Coordinates: 42.58°N 121.93°W
- Type: Freshwater
- Primary inflows: Wood River
- Basin countries: United States
- Surface area: 3,200 acres (1,300 ha)
- Max. depth: 2 metres (6 ft 7 in)
- Surface elevation: 4,180 feet (1,270 m)
- Settlements: Chiloquin

Wood River Wetland is a marsh wetland and freshwater ecoregion in the heart of Klamath County in Southern Oregon. The wetland neighbors the north shore of Agency Lake and is the focus of a Bureau of Land Management river channel restoration project from agricultural land.

The wetland is flooded by the Wood River, with headwaters that emanate from a large natural spring located in Jackson F. Kimball State Recreation Site that feeds from an aquifer in the east side drainage of Crater Lake National Park. The wetlands is home to a rich biodiversity of wetland vegetation as well as local and migratory fauna of waterfowl.

== Access ==
Chiloquin and Fort Klamath are the nearest towns to the wetland and is situated off the Oregon Route 62.

== Restoration ==
Since the early 1990s, the Lakeview District of the BLM has been restoring the Wood River Wetland to promote the strengthening of historic meandering flow patterns and improve fish passage and habitat for native fish.
