= Klamath Northern Railway =

Klamath Northern Railway Company
Overview
- Headquarters: Gilchrist, Oregon
- Reporting mark: KNOR
- Locale: Central Oregon
- Dates of operation: July 1940–Present

Technical
- Track gauge: 4 ft 8 1/2 in (1,435 mm)
- Length: 10.6-mile (17.1 km)

Klamath Northern Railway Company (KNOR) is a 10.6-mile (17.1 km) shortline railroad operating from Gilchrist, Oregon to Gilchrist Jct, Oregon where is connects with Union Pacific Railroad's Cascade Subdivision.

The line was constructed in 1938 by the Gilchrist Timber Co. and purchased by the Klamath Northern Railroad Company in July 1940 to serve the Gilchrist Timber sawmill in Gilchrist, Oregon. The railroad name was changed to Klamath Northern Railway Company in the 1950s, which was used until 1991. KNOR also served the Glaineville Box Company sawmill from 1965 to 1977.

Crown Pacific Partners L.P. purchased the Gilchrist sawmill and railroad on October 4, 1991, renaming the line Crown Pacific Railroad, Inc. Crown Pacific renamed the railroad back to Klamath Northern Railway Company on January 1, 1995.

Crown Pacific Partners L.P. entered Chapter 11 bankruptcy in 2003, subsequently selling the Gilchrist sawmill and KNOR to International Forest Products Limited (d.b.a. "Interfor"). International Forest Products sold the Klamath Northern to Neiman Forest Products, owner of Gilcrest lumber Company in the fall of 2020, Operations resumed at the Mill in March 2021. KNOR continues to operate local freight trains most on a need basis and is powered by a GE SL-144 center cab locomotive.
