= Mazama (steamboat) =

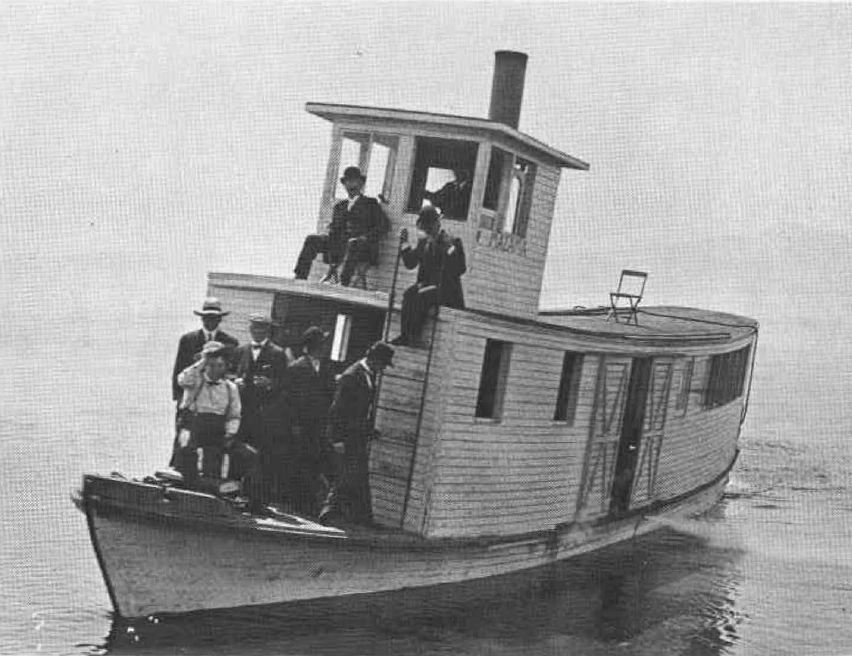
- Steamer Mazama, prior to 1912

History
- Owner: Crater Lake Navigation Company
- Route: Upper Klamath Lake and Wood River
- Launched: May 4, 1908
- Fate: Scrapped
- Notes: Rebuild in 1911 with longer hull, using original engines

General characteristics
- Class & type: inland shallow draft passenger/freighter
- Length: As built: 50 ft (15.2 m) reconstructed 1912: 63 ft (19.2 m)
- Beam: As built: 12 ft 9 in (3.9 m) reconstructed 1912: 12 ft 9 in (3.9 m)
- Decks: one
- Installed power: Dual steam engines, 12 horsepower each, twin propellers
- Speed: about 10 miles per hour.
- Capacity: As reconstructed 1912: 25 tons cargo

Mazama was a small steamboat driven by twin propellers that operated on upper Klamath Lake starting in 1909. Mazama was, reportedly, the only craft ever to navigate the Wood River, a tributary of upper Klamath Lake. For a few years, until the construction of a rail line, Mazama was an important link in transportation system linking Fort Klamath to Klamath Falls.

== Route and ownership ==
Mazama ran on a regular route from Klamath Falls to the town of Fort Klamath, Oregon, which required a run up the Wood River, which was a narrow and very crooked stream. Mazama was owned by Jasper B.C. "Jap" Taylor and Millard Fillmore "Cap" Parker. Their business was to haul freight to Agency Landing for Fort Klamath. On the return, the vessel usually transported hay to Klamath Falls.

In March, 1908, articles of incorporation were filed with the Oregon Secretary of State for the Crater Lake Navigation Company, naming Millard Filmore "M.F." Parker (1856-1930), J.B.C. Taylor, and Jennie Gates as the incorporators. The company was capitalized at $5,000, and reportedly all the stock had already been sold. J.B.C. Taylor was to be the general manager. The company's stated corporate purpose was to operate steam and electric boats, carrying passengers and freight, on upper Klamath Lake and its tributaries, including the Wood River.

== Construction ==
In early 1908, J.B.C. "Jap" Taylor and M.F. "Cap" Parker began building Mazama near Hanks Landing on upper Klamath Lake. The boat was intended to be 50 feet long, with a 12-foot beam (width), powered by two 12 horsepower steam engines driving twin propellers. By the end of February, the keel had been laid, the frames assembled, and lumber was ready for the sides. The boat was anticipated to be placed in use by May 1. Reportedly it was specially built for operations on the Wood River to make the sharp turns around the river's bends, which could not be done by larger vessels, such as the Winema.

In March 1908, J.B.C. Taylor went to San Francisco to purchase machinery for the steamer which was still under construction. Taylor was able to buy the machinery for $3,500.

The steamer was launched on May 4, 1908, however the machinery had not yet arrived. The engines arrived later that month, and were scheduled to be installed into Mazama in the week starting June 1.

== Operations ==
Mazama sometime between 1908 and 1912, before reconstruction. The vessel's owners are standing on the foredeck:Jasper B.C. "Jap" Taylor, on left, and Millard Fillmore "Cap" Parker on right.

On July 29, 1908, Mazama made its first trip up the Wood River, reaching the Weed Bridge, at river mile 5.9. This was a point three miles away from Fort Klamath. A telephone report from the Klamath Agency had been received stating that the steamer could be seen working its way up the river. Some dredging work had been done at the mouth of the river, for a price of $100, by a Jas. Wheeler, which permitted ready crossing of the bar by boats. The contract for this work was let by the Klamath Falls Chamber of Commerce. The plan was to establish a landing at the point reached by Mazama, through which would travel all traffic between Klamath Falls and Fort Klamath, as well as tourist traffic to and from Crater Lake.

By mid-August 1908, low water in the Wood River made it likely that Mazama would have to suspend its run to Agency Landing. Operation of the Mazama in the river stirred up the sand on the river bottom, which washed downstream and formed a bar at the river mouth, making it difficult for a larger vessel to pass. The bar had been removed several times, but it kept building up again. With the water low, Captain Parker of Mazama planned to use a launch on the Wood River instead of the larger steamer.

=== Capsized in squall ===
On October 11, 1908, while towing a barge around Eagle Point, Mazama was struck by a sudden gust of wind, which capsized the boat. General weather conditions were not stormy at the time. This was in the same area that a high wind had blown over the larger steamer Winema the previous year, 1907.

There was no loss of life among the five or six men who were on board Mazama, as they were able to reach safety on board the barge. Most of the freight also was saved. Mazama lay in six to eight feet of water. M.F. "Cap" Parker the boat's owner proceeded to the scene immediately to make efforts to raise the boat. The first report of the incident stated that "little trouble is anticipated in raising" the vessel.

=== Sunk at mooring ===
On December 24, 1910, Mazama reached the landing for Fort Klamath, on the Wood River with a barge loaded with freight in tow. The boat was left overnight anchored in the river, while the crew left to celebrate Christmas. The next day, Captain Parker found the boat had sunk in about six feet of water. There had been a collision between the barge and the steamer, which left a hole in the boat's hull, causing it to flood. Plans were made to raise the Mazama.

== Reconstruction ==
In February 1912, Mazama was overhauled and a new hull was constructed for the vessel. The work was done by boat builder I.R. McDonald. The rebuilt boat would be 63 feet long, with a beam (width) of 13 feet, and a maximum carrying capacity of 25 tons of cargo, although 15 tons would be the more usual load.

On May 11, 1912, the new hull was reported to be "practically completed" and that the boat's owners, Parker and Taylor were in the process of installing the machinery from the old boat into the new one. It was thought that the old hull would be converted into a houseboat.

The rebuilt boat was expected to be complete within the next week. The rebuilt steamer was reported to have greater cargo capacity, so that the use of a barge would no longer be necessary. The vessel's speed was estimated to be about ten miles per hour. Passenger accommodations were also included, and the vessel was reportedly better constructed and much safer. While the steamer was undergoing reconstruction, freight had accumulated at the company's dock awaiting transport to various points around the lake.

Mazama would run up the Wood River to the Wood (or Weed) Bridge, which was about 4 miles from Fort Klamath. By 1912, a good road had been built between the steamer landing and Fort Klamath.

== Stranded by diversion of river water ==
In November 1912, Mazama became stranded in the Wood River, when as a result of poorly constructed irrigation canal, most of the water in the river was diverted into the canal, flooding the surrounding area, and leaving insufficient water in the river for Mazama to navigate. The level of the river water was only a few inches, and the steamer would be stranded until the breach in the river bank caused by the diversion could be repaired. Sufficient depth of water would still have to be accumulated in the river to float the Mazama, and it was reported that this could be done by a temporary dam of sandbags, which would require construction of a substantial embankment. This was anticipated to be expensive.

In the fall of 1914, Mazama was caught in the ice on Wood River, and was unable to return to Klamath Falls. Mazama was not able to return to Klamath Falls until March 17, 1915.

== Disposition ==
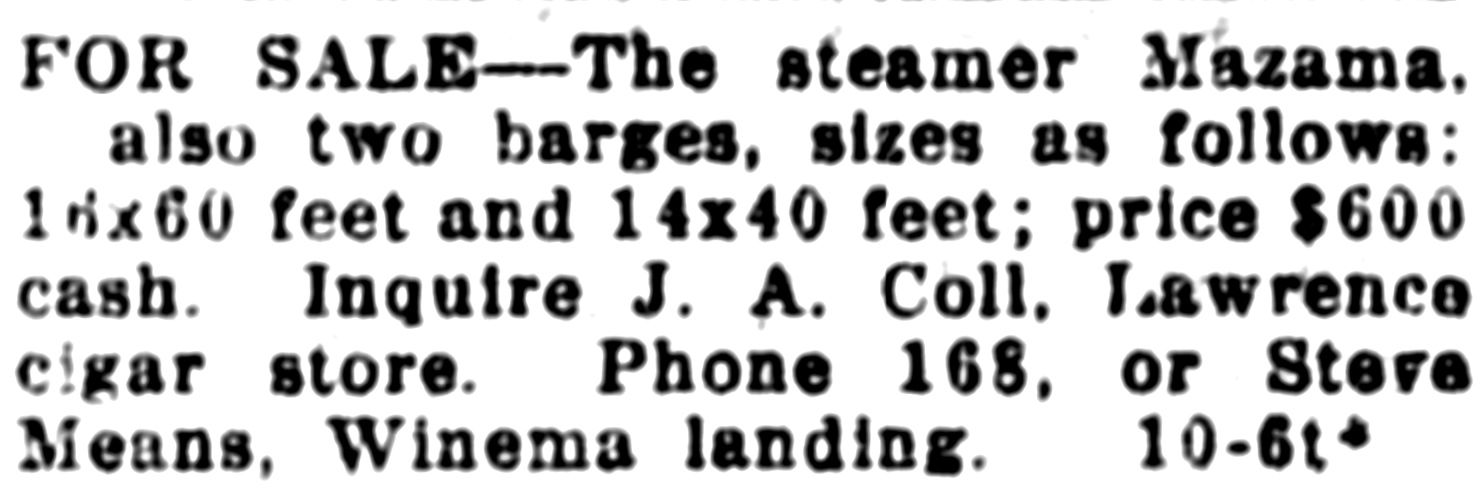
Advertisement for the sale of Mazama and two barges, for $600, placed March 3, 1919.

Mazama became the sole property of J.B.C. Taylor in 1918.

The second Mazama, although larger than the original, still used the same engines, and was therefore slower, and reportedly "never satisfactory". Mazama’s operations were terminated when the Southern Pacific Railroad reached Chiloquin, Oregon, as the steamer could not compete with the rates charged for rail transport.

On March 13, 1919, the steamer Mazama was advertised for sale, together with two barges, one 16 by 60 feet, the other 14 by 40 feet, for a total price of $600. Mazama was dismantled at some time, after which the hulk lay in the tule reeds for years.
