= Sun Pass State Forest =

State Forest in Klamath County, Oregon, United States

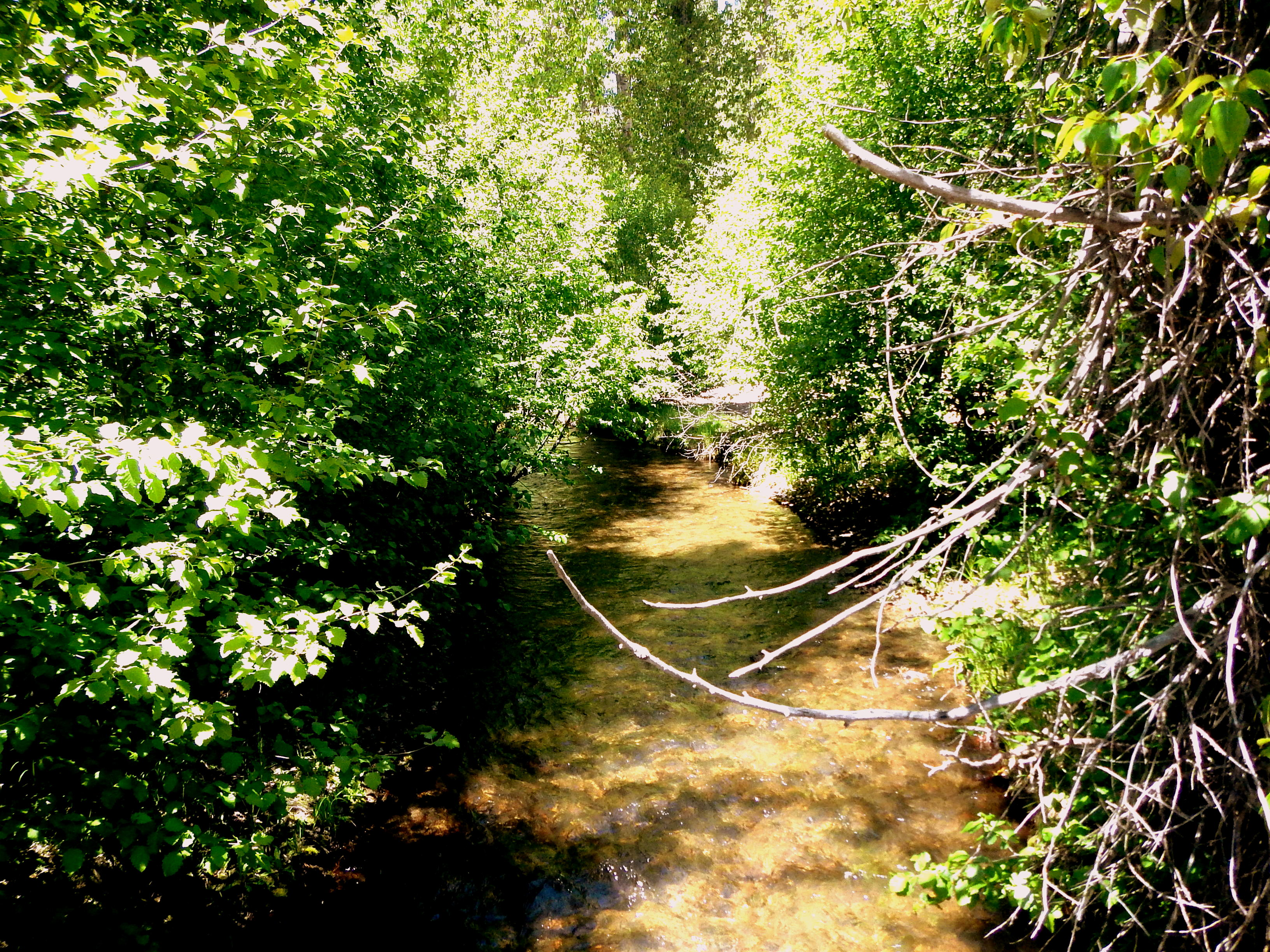
- Sun Creek in the Sun Pass State Forest, May 2009
- Interactive map of Sun Pass State Forest
- Type: Public, state
- Location: Klamath County, Oregon, United States
- Coordinates: 42.7374°N 121.8733°W
- Area: 21,317 acres (8,627 ha)
- Operator: Oregon Department of Forestry

Sun Pass State Forest is one of six state forests managed by the Oregon Department of Forestry. The forest is located 40 miles (64 km) north of Klamath Falls, Oregon near the southeastern corner of Crater Lake National Park. It is the largest single block of Oregon state forestry land east of the Cascade Mountains. The forest is managed as part of the Klamath-Lake District, comprising 21,317 acres (8,627 ha) of the 33,739 state-owned acres within the district.

== Forest ownership ==
Oregon state forests consist of two types of land, Oregon Board of Forestry lands and Common School Forest Lands. These lands were acquired from two sources, are controlled by two different state entities and each has a distinct legal mandate that guides its management.

Board of Forestry lands were acquired either through direct purchase or through ownership transfer from Oregon counties in exchange for a portion of the land’s timber revenue. The Department of Forestry manages these forest lands under the direction of the Board of Forestry. By law, these lands are managed to achieve a healthy, productive, and sustainable forest ecosystems that provides the people of Oregon a full range of economic, social, and environmental benefits. The majority of the forest revenue is distributed to Oregon counties and local taxing districts. In Sun Pass State Forest, 85 percent of the land belongs to the Board of Forestry.

When Oregon was granted statehood in 1859, it received 3,500,000 acres (14,000 km^{2}) of grazing and forest lands from the Federal Government specifically to support public schools. These lands are known as Common School Forest Lands and are owned by the Oregon State Land Board. The board consists of the Governor of Oregon, the Secretary of State, and the State Treasurer. The Department of Forestry manages Common School Forest Lands under a contract with the State Land Board. The purpose of these lands are to generate the greatest amount of revenue over the long run for the Common School Fund consistent with sound land and timber management practices. In the Sun Pass forest, 15 percent of the land is owned by the State Land Board.

== History ==
The State of Oregon purchased the original 14,450 acres (58.5 km^{2}) of Sun Pass State Forest from Yawkey, Woodson, Ourbacker, and Algoma Lumber Company in 1943. In 1944, Klamath County deeded an additional 480 acres (1.9 km^{2}) to the Board of Forestry to expand the Sun Pass unit. In 1947 and 1948, the Oregon Board of Forestry bought two more parcels of private land which were added to Sun Pass.

In 1955, the Board of Forestry deeded 19 acres (77,000 m^{2}) of Sun Pass land to the Oregon State Highway Division to create Kimball State Park. The park was named after Jackson F. Kimball, a district forest warden for the Klamath Forest Protective Association.

In the 1970s and 1980s, the State of Oregon and the Winema National Forest (now the Fremont-Winema National Forests) agreed on a series of forest land exchanges to expand the contiguous area of Sun Pass. The state gave up a number of small outlying parcels in exchange for 4,401 acres (17.81 km^{2}) of United States Forest Service land adjacent to the main area of Sun Pass. These exchanges completed the expansion and consolidation of Sun Pass State Forest.

== Topography ==
Sun Pass State Forest sits on multiple layers of basalt rock. These layers have been cut by numerous faults resulting in lake basins and large escarpments. One of these escarpments borders the Agency Lake basin and runs northward through the forest.

The topography generally slopes toward the south with four major topographical features dominating the forest. Sun Mountain in the northeast corner of the forest and Sand Ridge on the forest’s northern border are highly visible features. The eastern part of the forest is dominated by a large pumice plain while lava flows are the main feature in the northwest. In addition, two year-around creeks shape the character of the forest. Sun Creek runs through the center of the forest, and over time, has cut a small canyon through the forest’s central plains. Annie Creek runs along the western border of the forest, and is flanked by meadow lands.

== Water resources ==
Annie Creek is a tributary of Wood River, originating in Crater Lake National Park. After leaving the park, it crosses one half miles of Winema National Forest before entering Sun Pass State Forest. It runs through the forest for approximately one mile and then flows onto private pasture land where it is joined by Sun Creek. Annie Creek flow into the Wood River about 4 miles (6.4 km) beyond the forest boundary. Annie Creek is classified as a large, fish-bearing stream under provisions of Oregon Forest Practices Act.

Sun Creek is a tributary of Annie Creek. Its source is also inside the boundary of Crater Lake National Park where it supports a population of bull trout. After leaving the park, it flows through the middle of Sun Pass State Forest for three miles (5 km). It flows into Annie Creek about one mile (1.6 km) beyond the forest border. Once it leaves the forest, Sun Creek is tapped for agricultural irrigation; however, the Department of Forestry protects the upper reach with a “Protective Conservancy — Critical Wildlife Habitat” land use classification.

== Wildlife ==
There are 269 vertebrate species that live within the Klamath-Lake District’s forest lands. This total includes 12 amphibians, 5 fish, 15 reptiles, 157 birds, and 80 mammals. Many of these species have ranges that include Sun Pass State Forest.

Every five years since 1997, the Klamath-Lake District conducts a pileated woodpecker survey in the Sun Pass State Forest to monitor the health of the wildlife habitat. The results of the survey show a stable population of pileated woodpeckers are located within the forest.

== Forest management ==
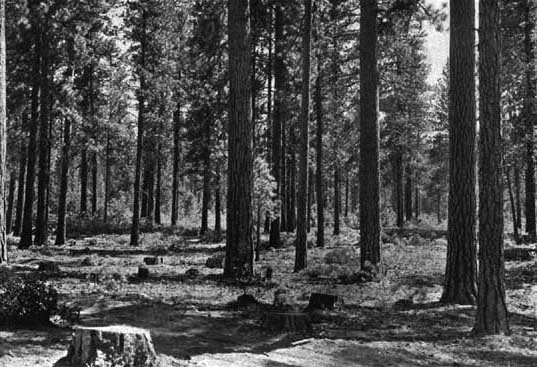
Example of selective cutting in ponderosa pine forest

When the State of Oregon acquired the original 14,450 acres (58.5 km^{2}) of land, it had been thoroughly logged. State foresters allowed an existing understory of white fir to develop. Much of the area was an ideal new generation of ponderosa pine and sugar pine to take hold. As a result, today’s Sun Pass forest is unusually diverse compared to similar forest areas of eastern Oregon.

The Klamath-Lake District made its first sale in May 1944, selling ten cords of firewood. In July 1949, the district completed its first regular timber sale. In 1955, the Board of Forestry appointed a full-time forester to manage the state forest lands in Klamath and Lake counties. During the early years of active management, most timber sales were clean-up logging and salvage sales designed to cull areas of white fir and remove pockets of insect infested or diseased trees. Commercial thinning was done in the ponderosa pine and lodgepole pine stands to encourage continued growth in those areas.

The first forest inventory was completed in 1959. The inventory was updated in 1976 and expanded in 1990-91. A tree improvement program began in 1970. Its goal was to introduce genetically superior seedling into the Sun Pass forest. In 1979, tree plantations were established to provide well adapted seedling for the Sun Pass area. In 1978, the Klamath-Lake District developed a long-range plan that continues to help forest managers to balance a wide range public interests in the Sun Pass forest.

Today, most of Sun Pass State Forest is covered with uneven-aged, mixed conifer stands dominated by ponderosa pine that have been shaped by selective timber harvesting. The stands include a variety of tree sizes. Clearcutting is generally limited to the lodgepole pine areas in the northeast corner of the forest.

== Recreation and education ==
There is no formal recreation program in Sun Pass State Forest. The forest has no developed recreation sites, and the Klamath-Lake District has no recreation staff or recreation program funding. The district does issue fire permits which are required for campers. The most popular area for camping is along Sun Creek. The campsites are cleared areas with primitive fire pits and vehicle access from the main roads.

Sun Pass State Forest hosts the Klamath Outdoor Science School program. The science school teaches students about forestry in an outdoor environment. Students visit in groups of 30 to 50. Some students stay only for the day classes, but most stay overnight in yurts and continue their learning into the evening. Students are required to maintain a field journal to gather data that can be analyzed back at their school.
