= List of Oregon state forests =

The U.S. state of Oregon has six state forests. Five are administered by the Oregon Department of Forestry, while Elliot State Forest is administered by the Oregon Department of State Lands.

Name	Location	Area (acres)	Area (km^{2})
Clatsop State Forest	Clatsop County, Columbia County	136,000	550
Elliott State Forest	Coos County	93,000	380
Gilchrist State Forest	Klamath County	70,000	280
Santiam State Forest	Linn County	47,871	193.73
Sun Pass State Forest	Klamath County	21,317	86.27
Tillamook State Forest	Washington County	364,000	1,470
Total		732,188	2,963.06

== Former state forests ==
Former state forests include:

- Adair Tract State Forest, also known as Paul M. Dunn Research Forest, renamed and jointly administered as the McDonald-Dunn Research Forest by Oregon State University
- McDonald State Forest, north of Corvallis, renamed and jointly administered as the McDonald-Dunn Research Forest by Oregon State University
- George T. Gerlinger State Experimental Forest, administered by the Oregon Department of Forestry as part of its West Oregon District
- Van Duzer State Forest, now part of the H. B. Van Duzer Forest State Scenic Corridor

== See also ==
- Research forests managed by Oregon State University's College of Forestry
- H.J. Andrews Experimental Forest, cooperatively administered by Oregon State University and the US Forest Service
- Lists of Oregon-related topics
- Black Rock, Oregon
