= Jackson F. Kimball State Recreation Site =

State park in Oregon, United States

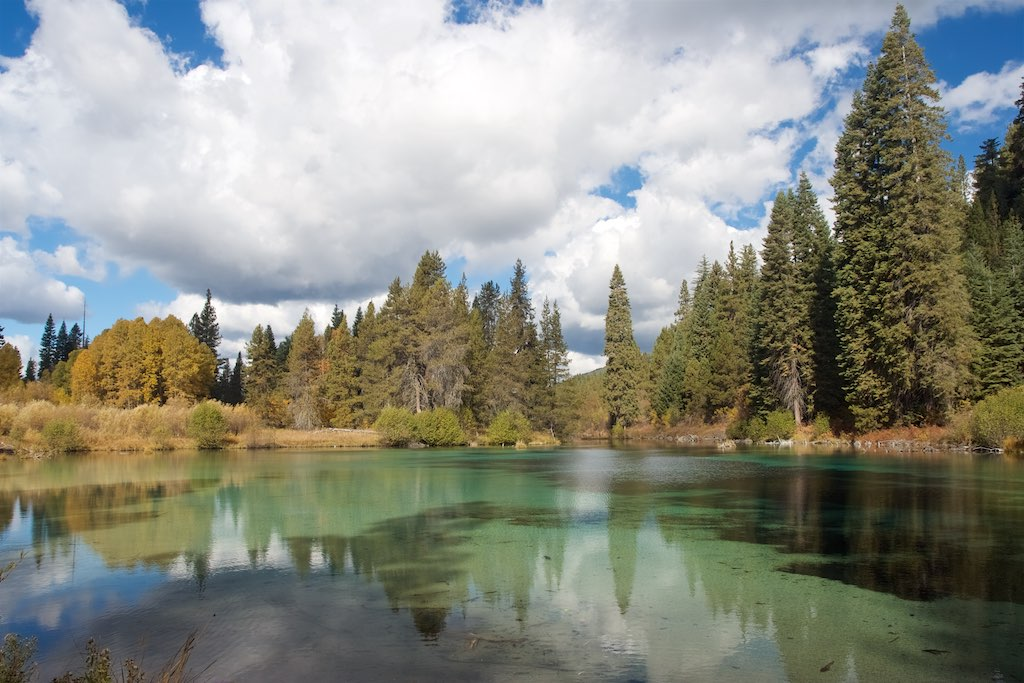
- Jackson F. Kimball State Recreation Site, October 2005

- Location within Oregon Location within the United States
- Type: Public, state
- Location: Klamath County, Oregon
- Nearest city: Klamath Falls
- Coordinates: 42°44′18″N 121°58′48″W
- Area: 19 acres (7.7 ha)
- Operator: Oregon Parks and Recreation Department

Jackson F. Kimball State Recreation Site is a seasonal state park in southern Oregon. The park is operated and maintained by the Oregon Parks and Recreation Department, and is located approximately 20 miles (32 km) southeast of Crater Lake National Park and 3 miles (4.8 km) north of Fort Klamath. The park was established in 1955, and covers 19 acres (7.7 ha) including the headwaters of the Wood River. It is accessible from May to November, weather dependant.

== Recreation ==
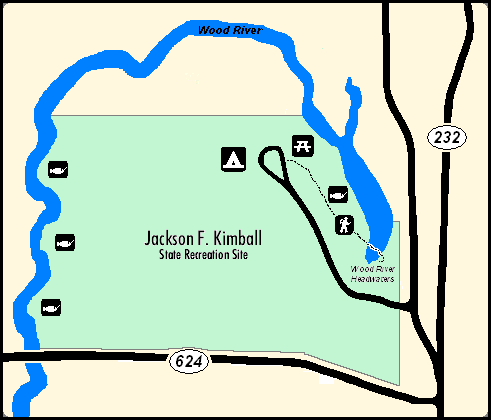
Kimball State Recreation Site covers 19 acres

Visitors to Kimball State Recreation Site can camp or picnic and enjoy water activities like fishing, canoeing, and kayaking. A short trail connects the main campground to the Wood River’s headwaters spring site.

The park has ten primitive campsites near the headwaters lagoon. Toilet facilities are primitive and potable water is not available in the park.

There is a popular horse trail that begins at Collier Memorial State Park that leads through the forest to Kimball State Recreation Site.

== Wood River ==
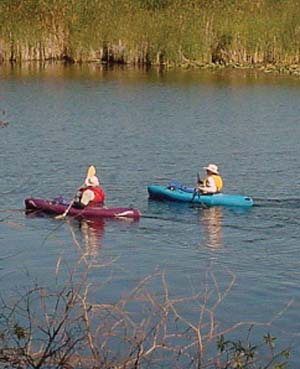
Kayaking on Wood River near Jackson F. Kimball State Park

The headwaters of the Wood River emanate from a spring located in Jackson F. Kimball State Recreation Site. The aquifer that feeds the spring is believed to originate twenty miles (32 km) northeast of the park on the east side drainage of Crater Lake National Park. Wood River meanders through pine forest and agricultural land for ten miles (16 km) before flowing into Agency Lake. The park itself is forested with ponderosa and lodgepole pine with some quaking aspen.

The river offers fine fishing that can be accessed from the shore or by canoe or kayak. Brook, brown, and rainbow trout are found in the Wood River and its tributaries. In addition, Bureau of Land Management biologists have found native Great Basin redband trout in the river between the Kimball State Recreation Site and the confluence of Annie Creek about a mile downstream from the park.

== Access ==
The area in the Cascade Mountains around the park experiences cold winters with significant snowfall. Summers are generally dry with warm temperatures. The park is at an elevation of 4,211 feet (1,284 m) and usually opens in mid-April weather permitting. However, in some years deep winter snowfalls can delay the park’s opening until June. The park usually closes in October, after the summer visitor season slacks off.

The Jackson F. Kimball State Recreation Site is located just off of Highway 62, approximately 20 miles (32 km) southeast of Crater Lake National Park, 3 miles (4.8 km) north of Fort Klamath, and 40 miles (64 km) northwest of Klamath Falls.

== History ==
In 1943, the State of Oregon purchased 14,450 acres (58.5 km^{2}) near Sun Mountain to establish Sun Pass State Forest. Additional land was added to the forest in 1944, 1947, and 1948. In 1955, the Oregon Board of Forestry deeded 19 acres (7.7 ha) of Sun Pass land to the Oregon State Highway Division to create Jackson F. Kimball State Park. The park was named after Jackson F. Kimball, a district forest warden for the Klamath-Lake Forest Protective Association. The park was officially renamed the Jackson F. Kimball State Recreation Site in 2004.

Jackson Kimball was born in Maine probably in 1874. In 1905 he began working for the Weyerhaeuser Timber Company. While he worked for Weyerhaeuser, Kimball also acted as agent or broker for the several smaller timber companies, and was a trustee of the American National Bank of Klamath Falls. He spent considerable time in Salem lobbying the Oregon Legislature on behalf of the timber industry. Kimball began his associated with the Klamath-Lake Counties Forest Fire Association, the forerunner of the Klamath Forest Protective Association, in 1908. He remained active in the association until his death in 1944.
