= Brooks-Scanlon Lumber Company =

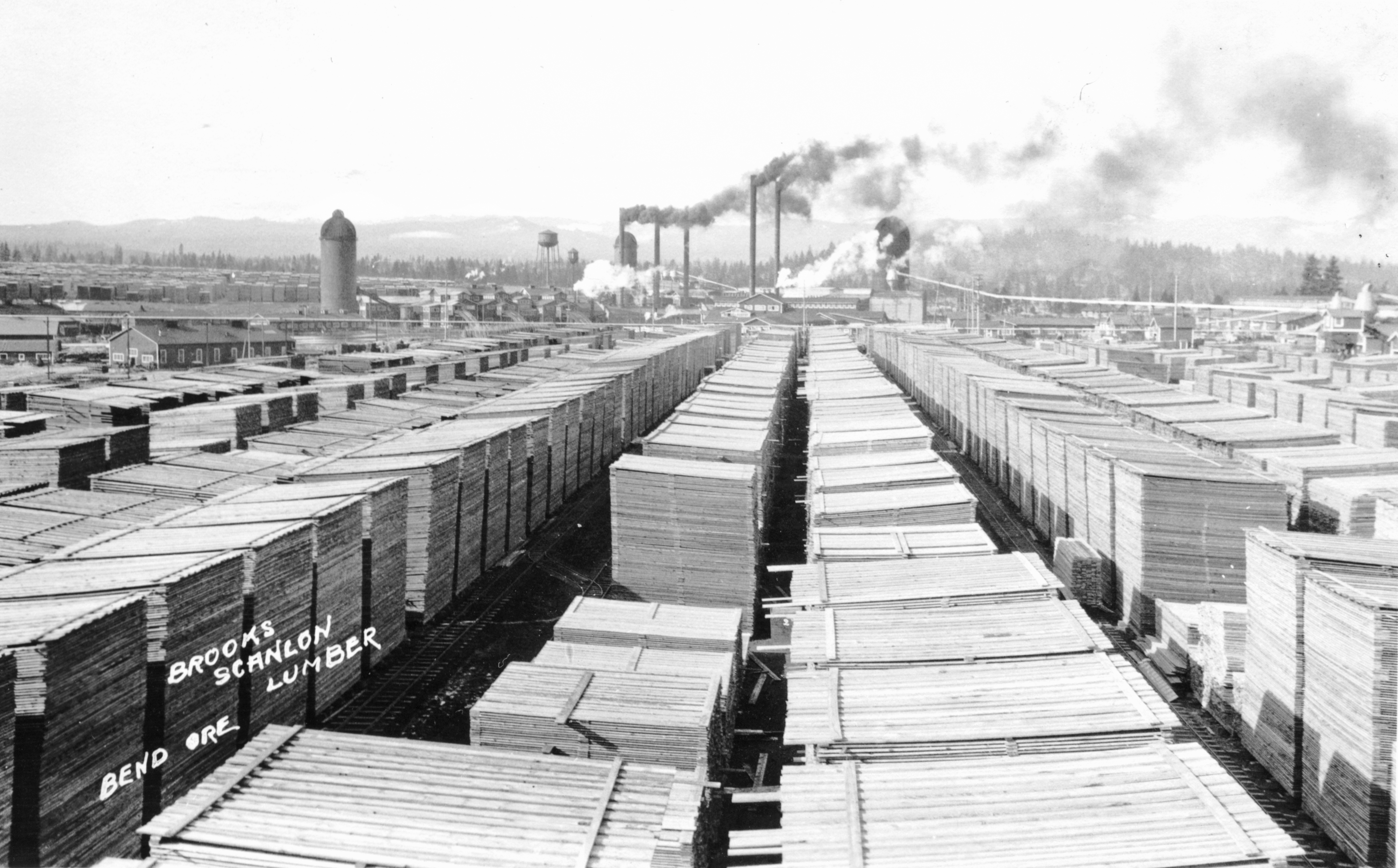
- Brooks-Scanlon lumber yard in Bend, Oregon
- Industry: Lumber products
- Predecessor: Scanlon-Gipson Lumber Company
- Founded: 1901
- Defunct: 1994
- Headquarters: Minneapolis, Minnesota

Brooks-Scanlon Lumber Company was a lumber products company with large sawmills and significant land holdings in Minnesota, Florida, British Columbia, and Central Oregon. The company was formed in 1901 with its headquarters in Minneapolis, Minnesota. Beginning in 1915, its main lumber production facility was in Bend, Oregon. For many years, its Bend sawmill was one of the largest lumber producers in the world. In 1969, the company created Brooks Resources to broaden its business base beyond timber production. Brooks-Scanlon's Bend sawmill was closed in 1994. Today, Brooks Resources is the only vestige of the company that is still in business.

== Founding ==
The Brooks-Scanlon Lumber Company was formed in 1901 with its headquarters in Minneapolis, Minnesota. The founding partners were Michael J. Scanlon, Anson S. Brooks, Dwight F. Brooks, Lester R. Brooks, and Henry E. Gipson. The firm was originally capitalized with $500,000. The partners later increased their capital investment to $1,750,000.

Brooks-Scanlon’s first lumber production facility was located in Scanlon, Minnesota, a new company town located on the St. Louis River south of Cloquet, Minnesota. A month after the company was formed, construction of a large sawmill began. The Scanlon mill opened late in 1901, ready for winter production. The mill processed approximately 600,000 board feet (1,400 m^{3}) per day.

The company quickly expanded its acquisition of standing timber to feed its mill operation. By 1903, the Cloquet sawmill was cutting 100,000,000 board feet (240,000 m^{3}) of lumber per year. At the same time, the company was expanding its railroad logging operations.

Eventually, local timber resources became scarce and the company began looking for new timber resources outside Minnesota. The Brooks-Scanlon sawmill in Scanlon closed in 1909, after cutting 700,000,000 board feet (1,700,000 m^{3}) of timber. That completely exhausted the supply of standing timber in the area around the mill. The company announced that the mill would be disassembled and shipped west.

== British Columbia and Florida ==
By 1906, adequate standing timber was hard to find in Minnesota, so Brooks-Scanlon began buying timberland in Florida, initially near Orlando. The company announced it planned to build a new sawmill in Florida, but did not give a target date for opening the mill. Two years later, the company began buying timber land in British Columbia as well.

In 1909, the company announced it would build several sawmills along the Fraser River in British Columbia. The company eventually selected a site near New Westminster, British Columbia, for its main milling operation.

Over the next decade, the company continued to buy Florida timberland. Eventually, the company acquired 900,000 acres (3,600 km^{2}) of virgin forest land in Florida. By 1920, the company was the largest landowner in the state.

In 1917, Brooks-Scanlon bought a sawmill in Eastport, near Jacksonville, Florida, to begin producing lumber for the New England construction market. The company produced lumber at the Eastport sawmill for over a decade. However, the Eastport mill was closed in 1929 when the company’s milling operations were moved to Foley. The company built a large new sawmill in Foley along with an adjacent company town.

By 1930, the Foley sawmill was the largest lumber production facility in Florida. The company’s Florida operation continued to grow throughout the early 1930s. In 1948, the company announced it would close its lumber production mill in Foley due to a lack of sufficient heavy timber to keep the mill running efficiently.

In 1951, Brooks-Scanlon sold 440,000 acres (1,800 km^{2}) of previously harvested Florida forest land to Buckeye Cellulose Corporation, a subsidiary of Procter & Gamble. A month later, Foley Lumber Industries bought Brooks-Scanlon's Foley plant and some additional timber land with the intention of working with Buckeye Cellulose to build a pulp mill to utilize the second-growth timber available on the land previously owned by Brooks-Scanlon.

== Oregon operations ==
In 1911, Brooks-Scanlon began looking at timber resources in central Oregon. In 1915, the company purchased large tracts of timber land in central Oregon, near Bend. The following year, Brooks-Scanlon opened a sawmill on the east bank of the Deschutes River on the outskirts of Bend. Directly across the river from the Brooks-Scanlon mill was the Shevlin-Hixon sawmill, a major competitor that opened a month before the Brooks-Scanlon mill began operating. When it began sawmill operations, Brooks-Scanlon owned 250,000 acres (1,000 km^{2}) of timberland south and east of Bend, while Shevlin-Hixon owned 215,000 acres (870 km^{2}) including parcels along 70 miles (110 km) on both sides of the Deschutes River. Within a year of opening, the Brooks-Scanlon and Shevlin-Hixon sawmills were the two largest producers of pine lumber in the world.

In 1922, Brooks-Scanlon built a second lumber production facility upstream from the company's original sawmill. The new sawmill complex was known as Mill B. The new production complex was much larger than the original Mill A facility. When the new sawmill was fully operational, Brooks-Scanlon was cutting lumber around the clock with more than 2,000 workers on the company's payroll.

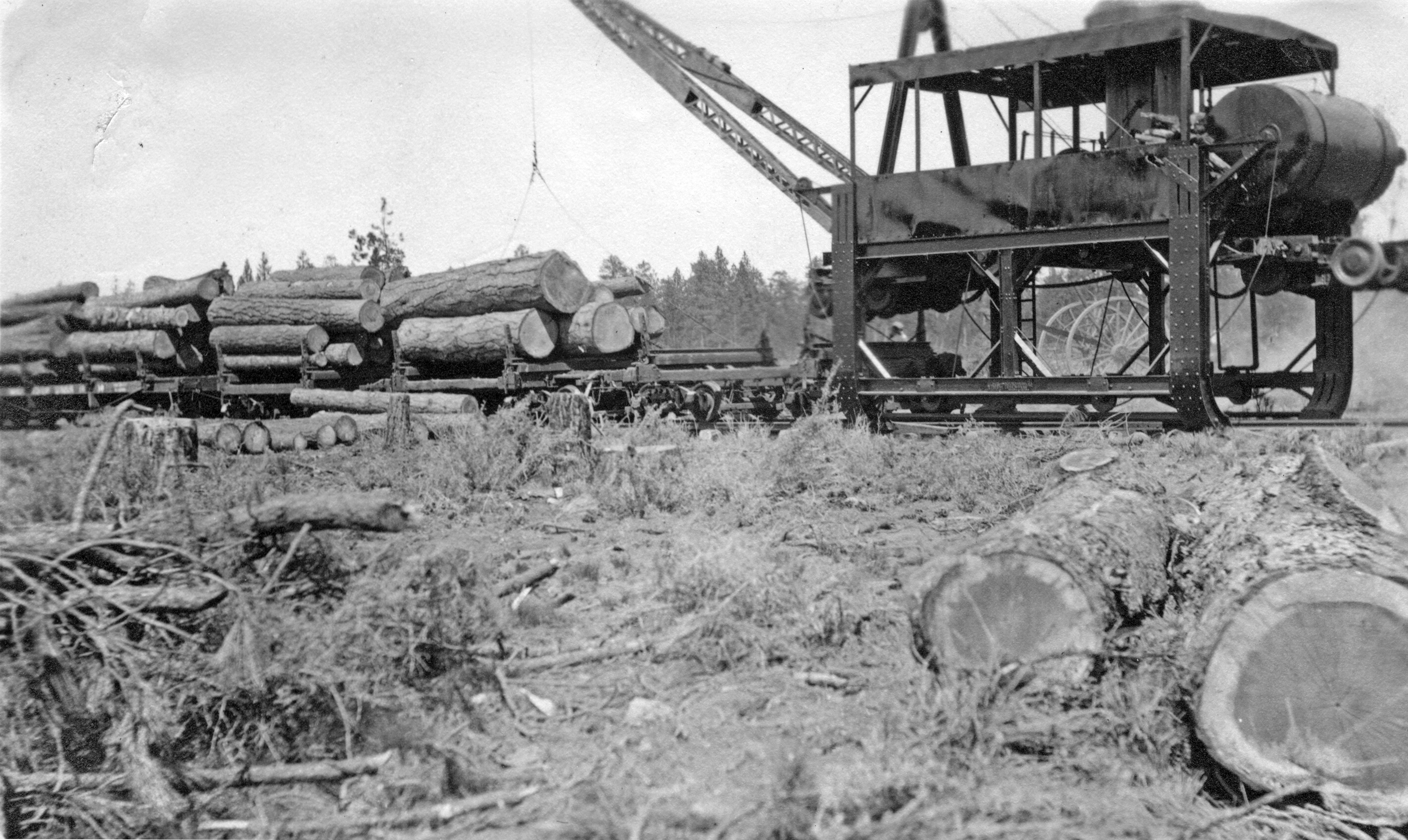
Brooks-Scanlon railroad logging near Bend

By 1930, the Brooks-Scanlon sawmill was running three shifts a day, which kept the sawmill operating around the clock. At their peak, the Brooks-Scanlon and Shevlin-Hixon sawmills were producing over 500,000,000 board feet (1,200,000 m^{3}) of lumber per year. Over the next several decades, Brooks-Scanlon bought large tracts of central Oregon timber land from Shevlin-Hixon and other forest land owners.

In the late 1930s and 1940s, Brooks-Scanlon began buying standing timber from the United States Forest Service to supplement the harvest taken from the company’s timber land. The company also significantly expanded its railroad logging north and west of Bend. Previously, its railroad logging operations were used primarily for harvesting timber lands south of Bend.

In 1950, Brooks-Scanlon bought the neighboring Shevlin-Hixon sawmill. The acquisition included the Shevlin-Hixon sawmill and adjacent property, all of its railroad and logging equipment, and large tracts of central Oregon timber lands along with the associated water rights. The Shevlin-Hixon sawmill was closed at the end of 1950. In the 1950s, Brooks-Scanlon kept its Bend sawmill producing lumber with timber purchased from the United States Forest Service in auctions administered by the Deschutes National Forest.

In 1969, Brooks-Scanlon created a subsidiary corporation called Brooks Resources. The new company was created to develop Brooks-Scanlon property for uses other than timber production. In 1979, Brooks Resources was officially separated from the Brooks-Scanlon company. Two years later, Brooks-Scanlon was purchased by Diamond International corporation. In the late 1980s, the company was sold to the newly formed Crown Pacific Partners. The former Brooks-Scanlon sawmill continued producing lumber until 1994, when the Bend mill was finally closed due to diminished timber supply in the area.

== Legacy ==
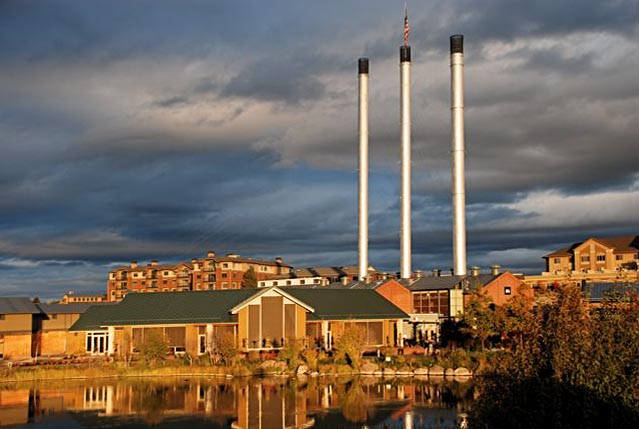
Old Mill District on Brooks-Scanlon mill site

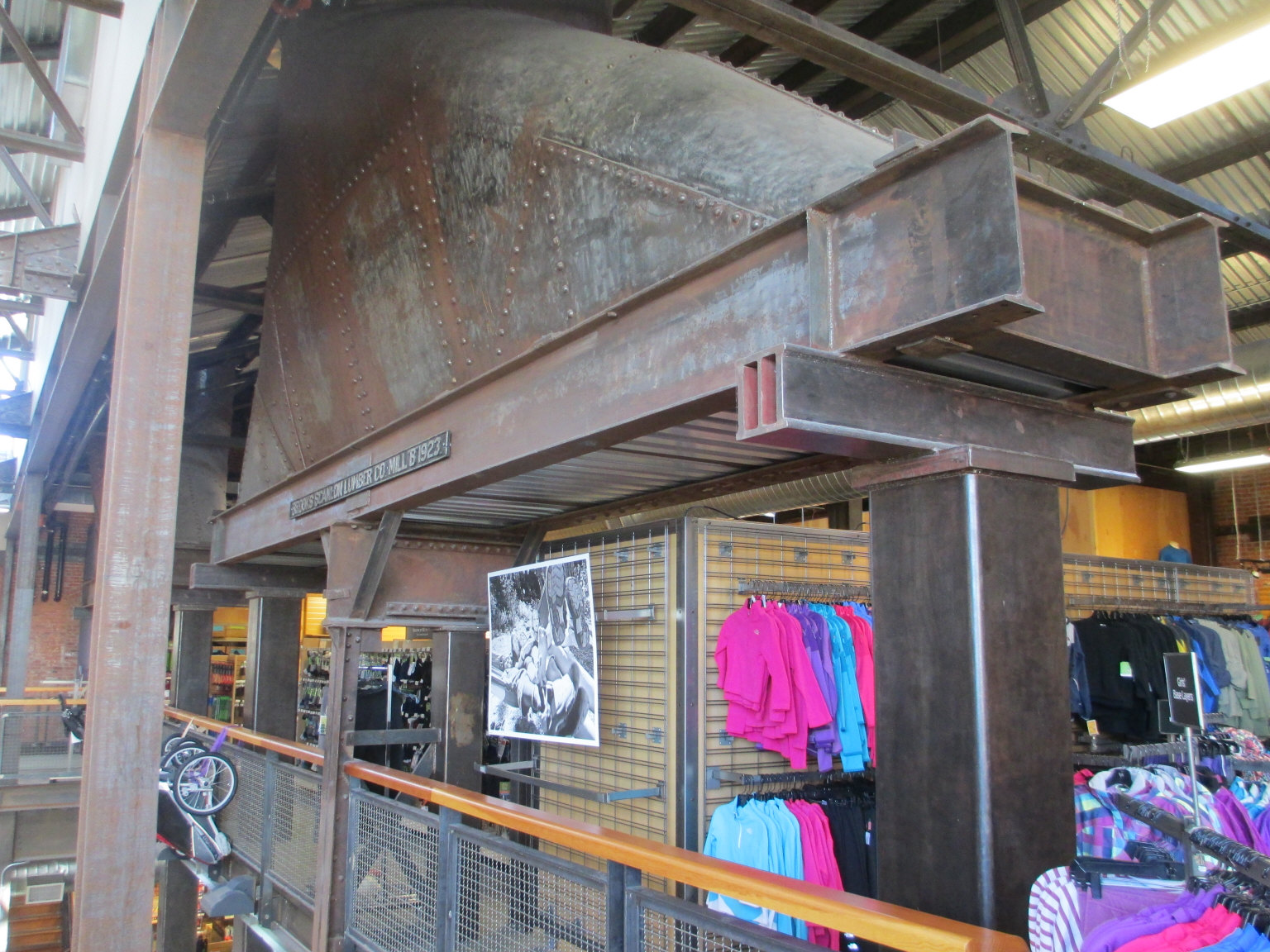
REI store with elements of Mill B powerhouse still visible

Today, the Brooks-Scanlon sawmill site has been redeveloped into the Old Mill District, a commercial and retail area on the banks of the Deschutes River in Bend. Brooks-Scanlon's Mill A building is now an office complex. The Mill A powerhouse and burner foundations are now a public patio, filled with flowers in the summer. In addition, the Mill B powerhouse is the home of an outdoor sports retail business.

Brooks-Scanlon began working with the Bend community on park and recreation programs in the 1920s when the company donated 1,000 acres (400 ha) to the City of Bend to establish Shevlin Park. Today, Shevlin Park is still an important part of Bend’s park network.

The Bend Foundation is a non-profit organization founded by the Brooks-Scanlon Lumber Company in 1947 to help injured loggers and sawmill workers. Today, Brooks-Scanlon's offshoot, Brooks Resources, remains a major contributor to the Foundation which currently supports a wide range of community institutions and philanthropic programs throughout central Oregon. The Foundation funds scholarships, public artwork, and a wide variety of other community programs and environmental projects.
