= Hooligan (disambiguation) =

A hooligan is a participant in hooliganism—unruly, destructive, or bullying behaviour.

Hooligan(s) may also refer to:

== Hooliganism ==
- Football hooliganism, among fans of association football clubs
- Motorcycle hooliganism, among motorcycle riders

== Music ==
=== Performers ===
- Hooligan (rapper) (born 1980), Maltese rapper
- The Hooligans (group), a vocal group formed by Kanye West
- The Hooligans, Bruno Mars's band

=== Albums ===
- Hooligans (album), by the Who, 1981
- Hooligan, by Adam Calhoun and Upchurch, 2019

=== Songs ===
- "Hooligan" (song), by BTS, 2026
- "Hooligan", by Baby Keem from The Melodic Blue, 2020
- "Hooligan", by Embrace from Drawn from Memory, 1999
- "Hooligan", by the Heart Throbs, 1992
- "Hooligan", by Kiss from Love Gun, 1977
- "Hooligan", by the Smashing Pumpkins from Atum: A Rock Opera in Three Acts, 2023
- "Hooligans" (song), by Don Diablo and Example, 2009
- "Hooligans" by Bill Hicks from Arizona Bay, 1996
- "Hooligans", by Rancid from Life Won't Wait, 1998
- "Hooligans", from the Dad's Army stage show, performed by Bill Pertwee, 1975

== Other arts and entertainment ==
- Hooligan (wrestler) (born 1972), or Luciferno, Mexican masked professional wrestler
- The Hooligan, a 1911 play by W. S. Gilbert
- Hooligans (film), or Green Street, a 2005 British film
- Hooligans: Storm Over Europe, a 2002 computer game
- Hooligans, a 1984 novel by William Diehl

== Other uses ==
- Hooligan (fish), or eulachon, a species of smelt
- Hooligan (sternwheeler), an early-20th century steamboat in Oregon, U.S.
- Halligan bar or "hooligan tool", a forcible entry tool
