= Collier Memorial State Park =

State park in Oregon, United States

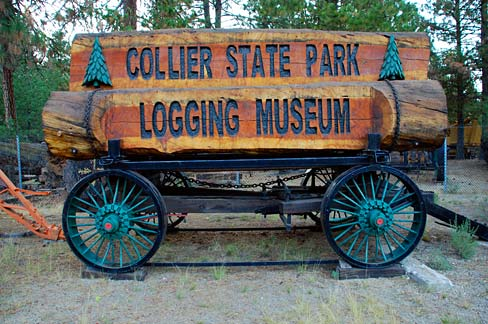
- Collier Logging Museum sign

- Location within Oregon Location within the United States
- Interactive map of Collier Memorial State Park
- Type: Public, state
- Location: Klamath County, Oregon
- Nearest city: Klamath Falls
- Coordinates: 42°38′35″N 121°52′58″W
- Area: 146 acres (59 ha)
- Operator: Oregon Parks and Recreation Department

Collier Memorial State Park is a state park in southern Oregon. The park is operated and maintained by the Oregon Parks and Recreation Department. It is located on U.S. Highway 97, approximately 30 miles (48 km) north of Klamath Falls and 105 miles (169 km) south of Bend. The park covers 146 acres (59 ha) along the Williamson River.

== History ==
The park was established in 1945 when two brothers from Klamath Falls, Alfred and Andrew Collier, donated 146 acres (59 ha) to the state of Oregon. The land was to be used for a park honoring their parents, Charles Morse Collier and Janet McCornack Collier.

In 1947, the Collier brothers donated a collection of antique logging equipment to be displayed as an outdoor logging museum on the park grounds. The equipment shows the evolution of the logging industry from axes and oxen to diesel tractors and logging trucks. The museum also highlights the role railroads played in developing the timber industry. Alfred Collier continued to add to the collection until his death in 1988. As a result, the museum has one of the largest collections of logging equipment in the world.

== Collier Logging Museum ==
Collier Memorial State Park features the Collier Logging Museum, an outdoor museum with a large collection of historic logging equipment. Some items date back to the 1880s and many are quite rare. The collection includes ox drawn "high wheels" used to raise the forward end of logs off the ground so they could be skidded through the forest to a collection area. Steam-powered "donkey engines" used steel cables to haul logs to a collection point. There are also steam tractors and diesel "cats" that performed the same function in their turn. The most modern piece of logging equipment on display is a Beloit tree harvester. The harvester, operated by one person, cuts trees near ground level using hydraulic blades, removes the limbs, and stacks the logs onto a logging truck all in one continuous operation.

There are two areas that display large saw mill machinery. One exhibit is a complete band saw used in the Edward Hines lumber mill. This saw turned trees into lumber from 1930 until 1980. A new building houses a saw mill steam plant along with a collect of chain saws.

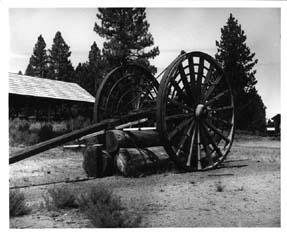
High wheel skidder at Collier museum

The museum also displays railroad equipment used to transport logs out of the forest, including a Baldwin locomotive used in the Mount Shasta area to haul redwood logs to saw mills in northern California. There is a self-powered McGiffert Log Loader built in 1926 which was in active use until 1962. The museum also owns a 1923 Clyde track laying machine, one of only two still in existence. It was used by at various locations around Klamath County by Weyerhaeuser until 1959. The museum even has a diesel-powered tug boat used to tow rafts of logs from an Agency Lake collection site to a saw mill at the south end of Upper Klamath Lake, a 22-mile (35 km) trip. The tug was operated on the lake from 1937 until 1943.

One of the most impressive exhibits is a 16-foot (4.9 m) cross section from the largest Douglas fir tree ever cut. This forest giant was already an old tree when Columbus landed in the New World. In addition, several logging camp structures have been relocated to the museum site along with twelve authentic pioneer homestead buildings. The pioneer village area gives visitor insight into how Oregon families once lived. The buildings also show several nineteen century building techniques used by Oregon pioneers.

In 2005, the Oregon Parks and Recreation Department, in cooperation with Oregon State Parks Trust and the Friends of Collier Memorial State Park, financed a major renovation of the museum. The project carefully restored logging machinery, railroad equipment, historic buildings, and other museum artifacts. Interpretive displays, signs, and other materials were also updated. As a result, Collier Memorial State Park has an excellent museum with a world-class collection of logging equipment and artifacts.

In 2013, a replica of a logging camp Cookhouse from 1920 was built and currently houses the visitor center, gift shop, and exhibits, including a chainsaw collection and an exhibit on the Two Four Two fire that burned over 400 acres of the park in 2020.

== Recreation ==
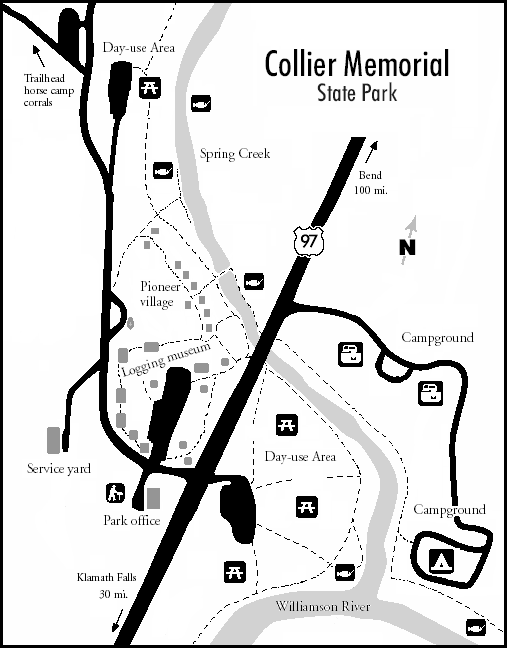
Park recreational facilities.

Collier Memorial State Park is located in an area forested with ponderosa and lodgepole pine. The park's facilities are well developed. Visitors can hike, camp, picnic, or fish in the park. A trailhead provides accesses to a number of hiking trails in the surrounding forest, and a popular horse trail goes from Collier state park to Jackson F. Kimball State Recreation Site. There are 50 sites with recreational vehicle hook-ups and 18 tent sites. There are also four horse corrals. The park has modern restrooms, hot showers, and laundry facilities. The park is open to campers April through October. Campsites are available on a first-come, first-served basis.

The park is located at the confluence of the scenic Williamson River and Spring Creek whose origin is a natural spring about a mile from the park. The aquifer that feeds the spring is believed to originate thirty miles northeast of the park in the east side drainage of Crater Lake National Park. The Williamson River is well known for its trout fishing. Brook, rainbow, and native Great Basin redband trout are found in the Williamson River in this area. The brook and rainbow trout often reach 20 inches (510 mm), and the redband trout in the Williamson River can reach record size, up to 5 pounds (2.3 kg).

== Access ==
The park is located in the just off of U.S. Highway 97, approximately 30 miles (48 km) north of Klamath Falls and 105 miles (169 km) south of Bend. The area in the Cascade Mountains around the park experiences cold winters with significant snowfall so the park is closed for camping from November through March. Summers are generally dry with warm temperatures, and all facilities are open from April through October.
