= Hooligan (sternwheeler) =

Steamboat which operated in Oregon, U.S., in the early 20th century

- Hooligan towing two empty barges up the Wood River to be loaded with hay.

History
- Owner: Harry E. Hansberry; later Joseph W. Guthrie (1914) and Millard Filmore "Cap" Parker (1916)
- Route: Upper Klamath Lake
- Launched: April 17, 1909
- Notes: renamed Annie Laurie in 1914

General characteristics
- Class & type: inland shallow draft passenger/freighter/tow boat
- Installed power: twin steam engines turning sternwheel

Hooligan was a sternwheel-driven steamboat that operated on Upper Klamath Lake and the Wood River in the U.S. state of Oregon, mostly in the towing of barges and log rafts. Built in 1909, Hooligan was sold in 1914, rebuilt as an excursion boat, and renamed Annie Laurie. The last attested powered operation of this vessel was in 1916. It appears to have later been used as an unpowered barge by the California Oregon Power Company, a predecessor to Pacific Power and Light.

== Nomenclature ==
Hooligan was sometimes referred to as the "Happy Hooligan" in press reports.

== Launch ==
Hooligan was launched on Saturday, April 17, 1909. The engines were installed later the same month. Hooligan was reported to have a "barge-type" front, but a photograph said to be of Hooligan shows a canoe-type pointed bow. According to one source, there were two steamers named Hooligan, one with a barge-type bow.

Hooligan was built by Capt. Harry E. Hansberry (1875–1937), who had been partners in the larger steamer Winema, also running on Klamath Lake. After the dissolution of the partnership, Hansberry built and operated Hooligan on upper Klamath Lake and also on the Wood River.

== Operations ==
Hooligan with two hay barges, at Weed Bridge, on the Wood River. The barges are to be taken downstream to Klamath Falls.

Hooligan had been placed in service by June 3, 1909, and was first used as a pile driver. Shortly after that the steamer was sent to the Odessa vicinity to work towing logs for the Long Lake Lumber Company. On Saturday, June 12, 1909, Hooligan transported a logging donkey engine for the Lake Lumber Company.

In the summer of 1909, Hooligan, under Capt. Hank Hansberry, towed millions of board feet worth of log rafts, all for the Lake Lumber Company. In mid-August 1909, the saw mall was shut down for over a week because of a lack of logs. Hooligan was still engaged in bringing them down the lake and had not yet arrived.

In October 1909, business was reported to be booming on upper Klamath Lake waterfront. There was a saw mill, a box factory, two large dredgers, a steam shovel and construction trains in operation. Five steamers were making regular trips on the lake: Eagle (under Captain Wickstrom), Hooligan, Mazama, Hornet and the large sternwheeler Winema. Earlier that year, in June, a newspaper report hinted that racing was occurring between the crews of the steamers Hooligan and Hornet.

In November 1909, Captain Hansberry was nearly drowned when a small boat he was riding in capsized. The water at the time was very cold. Hansberry was rescued by William Willits, engineer of the Hooligan, The next month, December 1909, all the boats on the lake were frozen in, with Hooligan at Crystal.

Hooligan operated up to Weed Bridge on the Wood River, where the principal cargo to be picked up was hay loaded on barges, to be taken down to Klamath Falls. Other boats using this landing were Mazama and Spray.

On May 23, 1913, Hooligan was reported to be towing log rafts for the Long Lake Lumber Company.

== Sale in 1914 ==
Steamers Hooligan on right, and Klamath, center, at Shippington landing, on upper Klamath Lake, 1911 or later.

By December 1913, Hansberry had left the Klamath Falls area and relocated to Seaside, Oregon. In February 1914, there were rumors of a sale of Hooligan to Portland parties, but nothing definite was confirmed.

On Monday, April 13, 1914, Captain Hansberry sold Hooligan to J.W. Guthrie, of Portland, Oregon. Guthrie was reported to be planning to rebuild Hooligan to make it more suitable for towing work.

In 1914, Hooligan was rebuilt by its new owner, Joe Guthrie, and renamed Annie Laurie. Guthrie intended to use the steamer to make excursion trips to points on the lake during the summer of 1914. Over $1,000 had been spent on the project by June 10, 1915. Joseph Guthrie's son, J.W. Guthrie, would be the engineer on the reconstructed vessel.

In early September 1914, Annie Laurie was at the dock undergoing minor repair. Captain Guthrie was also reported to be doing some painting in the ladies cabin.

== Sale in 1916 ==
In late March or early April 1916, Captain Millard Filmore "Cap" Parker (1856–1930) bought the Annie Laurie from Joe Guthrie. Parker was one of the owners of the propeller steamer Mazama. Parker was reported to be considering running the Annie Laurie as an excursion boat during the summer of 1916. On Sunday, August 27, 1916, with Captain Parker in command, Annie Laurie made an excursion trip to Shoal Water Bay.

== Disposition ==
The disposition of Annie Laurie ex Hooligan is not clear from the sources. It appears to have been used as an unpowered barge by John Linman and then by the California Oregon Pacific Company ("Copco").

It is known that the steamer's builder, Harry E. Hansberry, returned to Klamath County from Seaside in 1923, where he took up a homestead near Harriman Lodge and ran a fox farm. Hansberry was killed on May 20, 1937, when his team of horses ran away.
