= Winema (sternwheeler) =

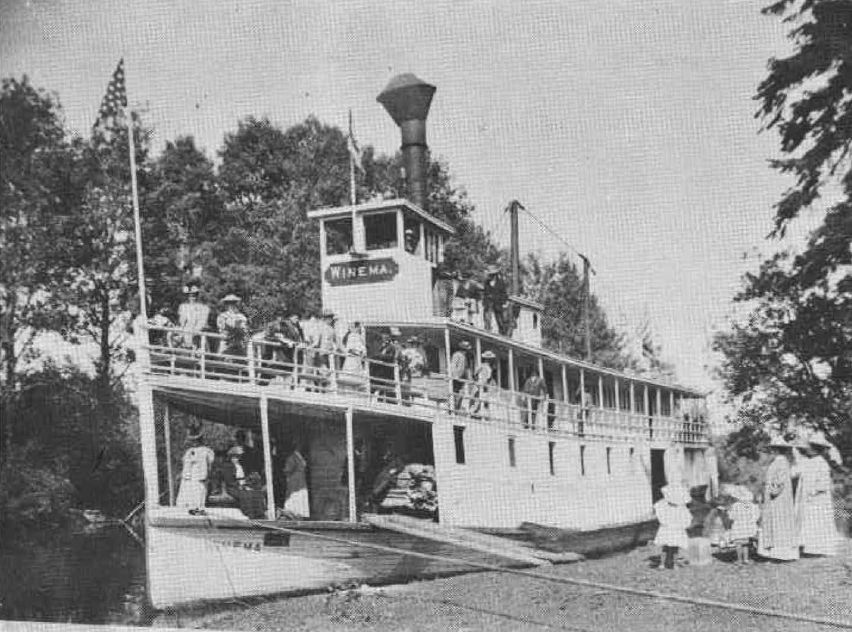
- Winema on Odessa Creek, circa 1906.

History
- Name: Winema
- Owner: Totten and Hansberry
- Route: Upper Klamath Lake
- Cost: $19,000
- Launched: January 31, 1905
- Out of service: about 1919
- Fate: Burnt 1925

General characteristics
- Class & type: inland shallow draft passenger/freighter
- Tonnage: 125 gross tons
- Length: 125 ft (38.1 m) or 110 ft (33.5 m) (reports vary)
- Beam: 22 ft 6 in (6.9 m) or 19 ft (5.8 m) (reports vary)
- Draft: Less than 2 ft (0.6 m)
- Decks: three
- Speed: 12 miles (19 km) per hour
- Capacity: 200 passengers

Winema was the largest steamboat ever to operate on Upper Klamath Lake in the U.S. state of Oregon. The steamer ran from 1905 to 1919, when it was hauled out of the water permanently. Winema was sunk by a sudden squall in August 1907. The vessel was raised, rebuilt and returned to service. The steamer remained out of the water for a number of years in the 1920, until it caught fire in 1925 or 1927 and was destroyed.

== Nomenclature ==
Winema, also spelled Wi-ne-ma, was named after Toby "Winema" Riddle (1848–1920) a well-known Modoc woman. The name was picked in a contest by Mrs. F.W. Jennings, who was awarded the honor of christening the vessel at its launch. Totten and Hansberry had solicited ideas for the name from the public in mid-January 1905.

Seventy-three persons submitted names, including three people who suggested "Winema" which a committee picked as the boat's name. Mrs. Jennings was selected to christen the boat by drawing her name from a hat containing the names of the three.

== Purpose ==
Winema was built in 1905, for the Klamath Lake Navigation Company to provide passenger and freight service to points on upper Klamath Lake. The vessel was sternwheel-driven, 125 gross tons, which had three decks but required less than 24 inches (610 mm) of water to float in.

== Design ==
Winema was intended to be a sternwheeler with the capacity to carry 200 passengers at a speed of 12 miles (19 km) per hour. It would cost $19,000 to complete the steamer.

John Totten furnished all the funds for the construction of Winema. Many years later, Totten stated that Winema him $2,500 including construction, salvage from the wreck (of August 1907), and reconstruction following the wreck. However, this is inconsistent with contemporaneous reports which give a much higher initial cost for the steamer. According to Totten's later recollection, the cargo capacity was 150 tons.

== Construction ==
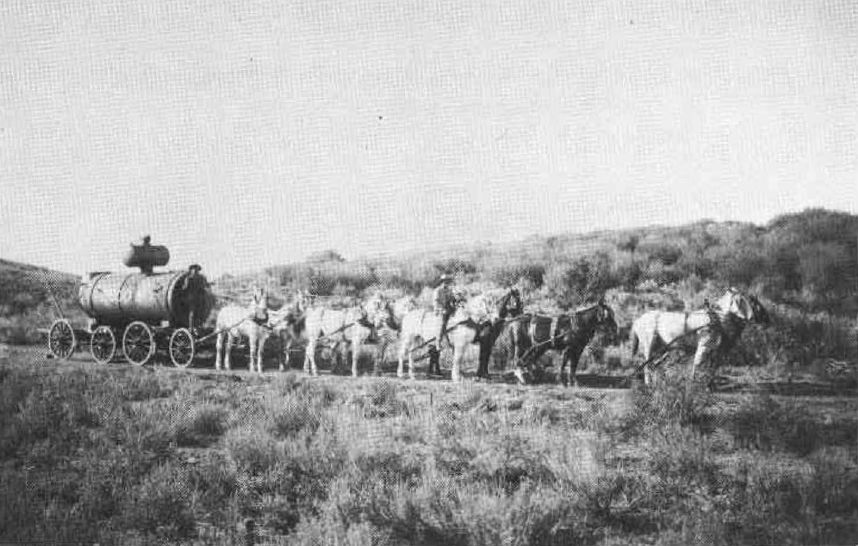
Boiler for Winema being hauled overland.

Winema was built on the Link River, about 2 miles (3.2 km) upstream from Klamath Falls, Oregon. Construction began in 1904, at a level spot of land just downriver from where the Fremont Bridge crossed the river in the 1950s. G.W. Walker, a ship carpenter, was hired from Portland to build the vessel. The ironwork was done by the firm of Lewis & Peil.

The boiler for Winema, which weighed 14,000 pounds (6,400 kg), was hauled overland by a ten-horse team from the railhead at Pokegama, Oregon to Klamath Falls in early 1905. This took five days. On hills, an additional four horses were added to the team. No road then extended from Klamath Falls to the site where the steamer was being built, so it was necessary to put down planks to prevent the wagon from becoming mired in the mud.

== Dimensions ==
Winema was 125 feet (38 m) long with a beam (width) of 22.5 feet (6.9 m). The length measurement may have included the fantail, which was the extension of the main deck over the stern, on which the sternwheel was mounted, as another report gives the length of the vessel as 110 feet (34 m) and the beam as 19 feet (5.8 m).

There were three decks and cabin accommodations. To operate on the shallow lake, the draft (the minimum depth of water necessary to float the boat) was only 22 inches (560 mm).

Power was furnished by twin horizontally-mounting steam engines, driving arms which turned the stern-wheel.

== Launch ==
Launch of Winema, January 28, 1905. Steam engines appear to have been installed, but not the boiler and the upper works.

Winema was launched on the afternoon of Saturday January 28, 1905. About 250 people attended the launching, a considerable number given the low population of the area and the distance of the launch site from Klamath Falls, then a small settlement.

Oliver C. Stone gave a short dedicatory speech, after which Mrs. Frank (Mollette) Jennings, of Klamath Fall broke a bottle of wine over the bow, saying: "On the waters of the mighty Klamath, under God's blue canopy, with this wine of sunny France, I christen thee Wi-ne-ma." Four workmen then used axes to cut the ropes holding the steamer on the shipways. Following the launch the machinery was installed in the vessel.

== Ownership ==
Winema was originally owned by John T. Totten (c1870-c1965). Harry E. Hansberry (1875–1937), spelled "Hansbury" in some reports, originally from Hood River, Oregon, is also reported to have had an interest. Both Totten and Hansberry were experienced steamboat men from the Columbia River. Hansberry had served on the well-known Columbia River steamers Bailey Gazert and Dalles City.

== Operations ==
Harry E. Hansberry was the first captain of Winema. Winema began operations in 1905 by making a daily run around the lake to every landing, transporting passengers and freight. On Sundays the vessel ran special excursions. The first excursion was run on Sunday, April 30, 1905. Over 200 people embarked for a run to Odessa and Pelican Bay, with the steamer departing the landing on upper Klamath Lake at 9:30 a.m. and arriving at Odessa at 11:30. After a stop at Pellican Bay, the boat returned to its home landing at 7:15 p.m.

Ice on the lake during the winter generally forced Winema to suspend operations from about December to March.

== Attempt to navigate Wood River ==
Winema on the failed attempt to navigate the Wood River, May 1905, surrounded by a "sea of grass".

Early in the Winema's career, in May 1905, an attempt was made to operate the vessel on the Wood River, which empties into the north end of upper Klamath Lake. The goal was to reach the Weed Bridge, and, if successful, this would have meant a much shorter wagon haul from the steamer landing to the settlement at Fort Klamath.

There was a sandbar at the mouth of the Wood River, and the steamer used its paddle wheel to wash out the sand to create a channel deep enough to allow the steamer to pass. This took 24 hours, and the sand washed away accumulated under the hull of the boat, so that the vessel could not move forward off of the bar. In backing off the bar, the hull became permanently hogged, that is, flexed so that the middle part of the boat was raised and the bow and the stern drooped lower into the water.

Even so, Winema proceeded, backwards, up the Wood River, until it reached a bend so sharp that the boat could not negotiate it. The attempt to reach the bridge had to be abandoned, but the boat still had to be extricated from the river. Upon return to the mouth of the river, the sand bar had filled up again, and it was only with some difficulty that Winema was turned around so that the sternwheel could be used to dredge out a channel through the bar.

There was only one place, about one-half mile upstream from the mouth of the river, where Winema might be turned, and in the process, Winema became wedged sideways between the river banks. It became necessary to excavate a bay in the bank of the river, using hay knives and cross-cut saws to cut the sod, before Winema could be turned. This took almost 3 full days.

== Wreck and reconstruction ==
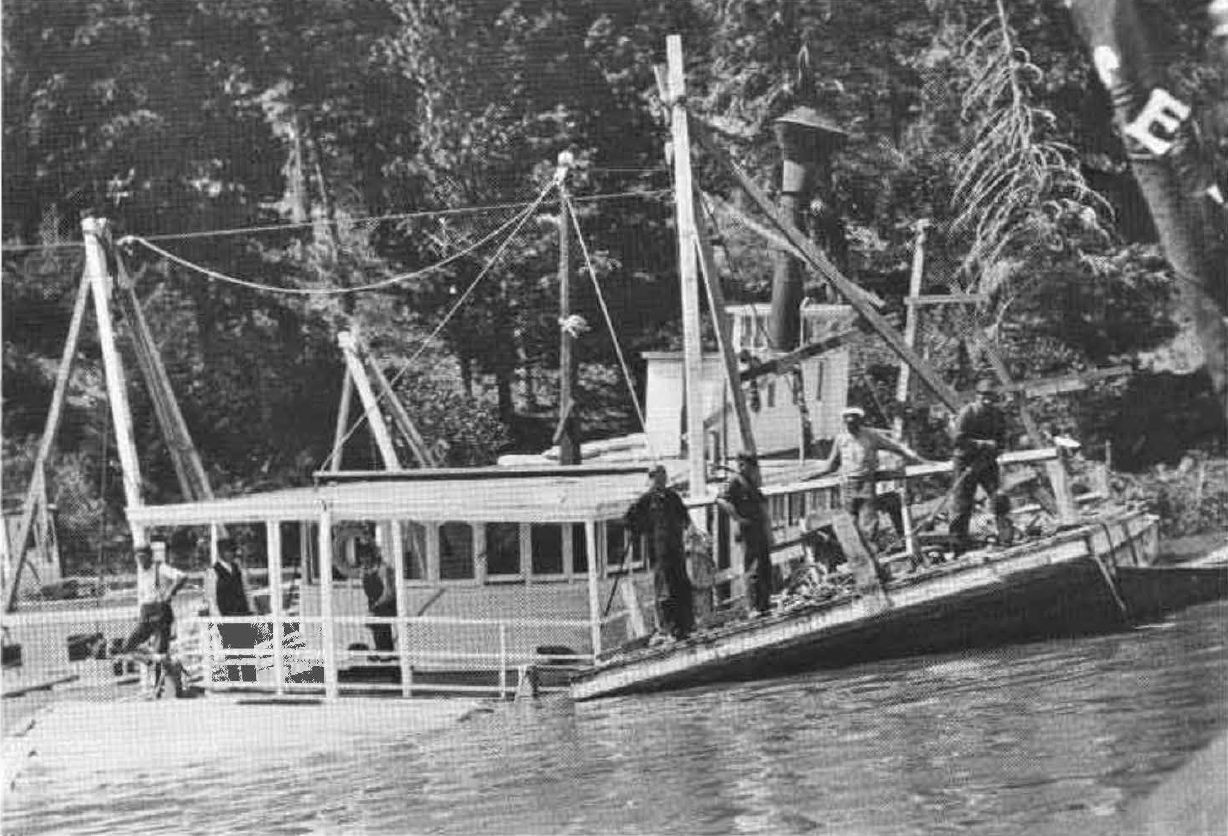
Winema under salvage following August 1907 sinking.

At 6:00 p.m. on the evening of August 7, 1907, with Captain Hansberry in command, Winema was wrecked just below Bear Island, about 20 miles from Klamath Falls, by a sudden gale. The steamer sank about 200 feet (61 m) from shore, in water that was 15 feet (4.6 m) deep. There were fourteen passengers on board at the time, including two women. One of the women had had to escape through a window of a cabin on the upper deck.

It was impossible to land the passengers immediately due to the "absence of boats." Instead, using a gang plank as a raft, Capt. Hansberry carried a line to the shore, and then went to the nearest landing to secure a boat, which he then used to bring off the passengers who had moved to the unsubmerged portion of the upper deck of the steamer.

Someone sent a message to Odessa landing, and the steam launch Hornet came to pick up the passengers, and take them to Klamath Falls, where they arrived at about 7:00 a.m. on the morning of August 8.

Winema was salvaged and reconstructed, with the top cabin structure mostly removed, to catch less windage. The boat was returned to the run on August 29, 1907. On June 17, 1908, Winema was reported to be "in commission" and apparently ready to operate on the lake. Reconstruction may have taken place during the winter of 1907–1908, because the "remodeled" Winema is reported to have been used in an excursion on July 23, 1908, with Mrs. Totten as cook.

== Later years ==
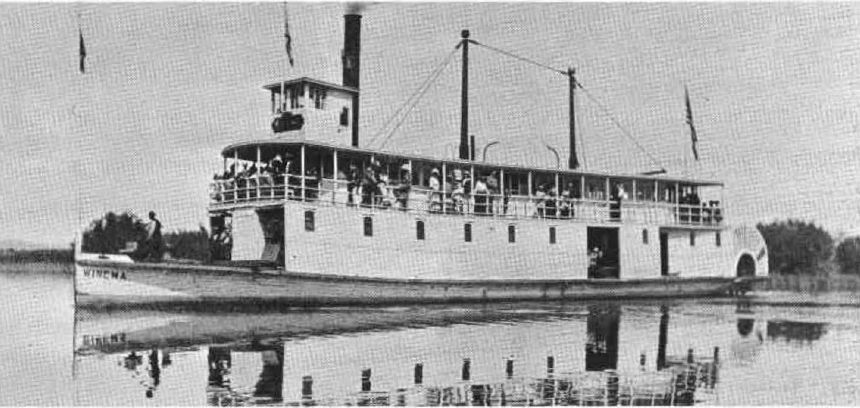
Winema circa 1911, showing reduced size of upper cabin as a result of post-wreck reconstruction.

The dissolution of the partnership of Totten and Hansberry was announced in February 1908. After the dissolution of the partnership, Hansberry built and operated the steamer Hooligan on upper Klamath Lake and also on the Wood River.

In late August 1912, Capt. John Totten was in command of Winema. In May 1913, Captain Totten announced that Winema would be used for Sunday picnic excursions to Rocky Point and the Harriman Lodge, at Pelican Bay.

By December 1913, Hansberry had left the Klamath Falls area and relocated to Seaside, Oregon.

== Abandonment ==
Winema was operated as an excursion steamer until as late as the summer of 1916. Possibly the vessel operated until 1919. In June 1919, Winema was reported to have undergone repairs and to be ready to be placed into service. In 1919 Winema was hauled out of the lake permanently near where the Pelican Bay marina was located in the 1960s. According to one source, Winema was abandoned in 1925.

The steamer burned at the dock at Shippington in April 1925.

== Photograph links ==
- Klamath County Museum, Post Card No. 30 Steamer Winema at Rocky Point, on upper Klamath Lake (from an old post card).
- Klamath County Museum, Post Card No. 94, Steamer Winema at Rocky Point, circa 1910 (from an old post card).
- Southern Oregon Historical Society/SOU Image SOHS01i_5091 Steamer Winema at Pelican Bay, circa 1911 (from an old post card).
