= Oregon Department of Forestry =

State agency

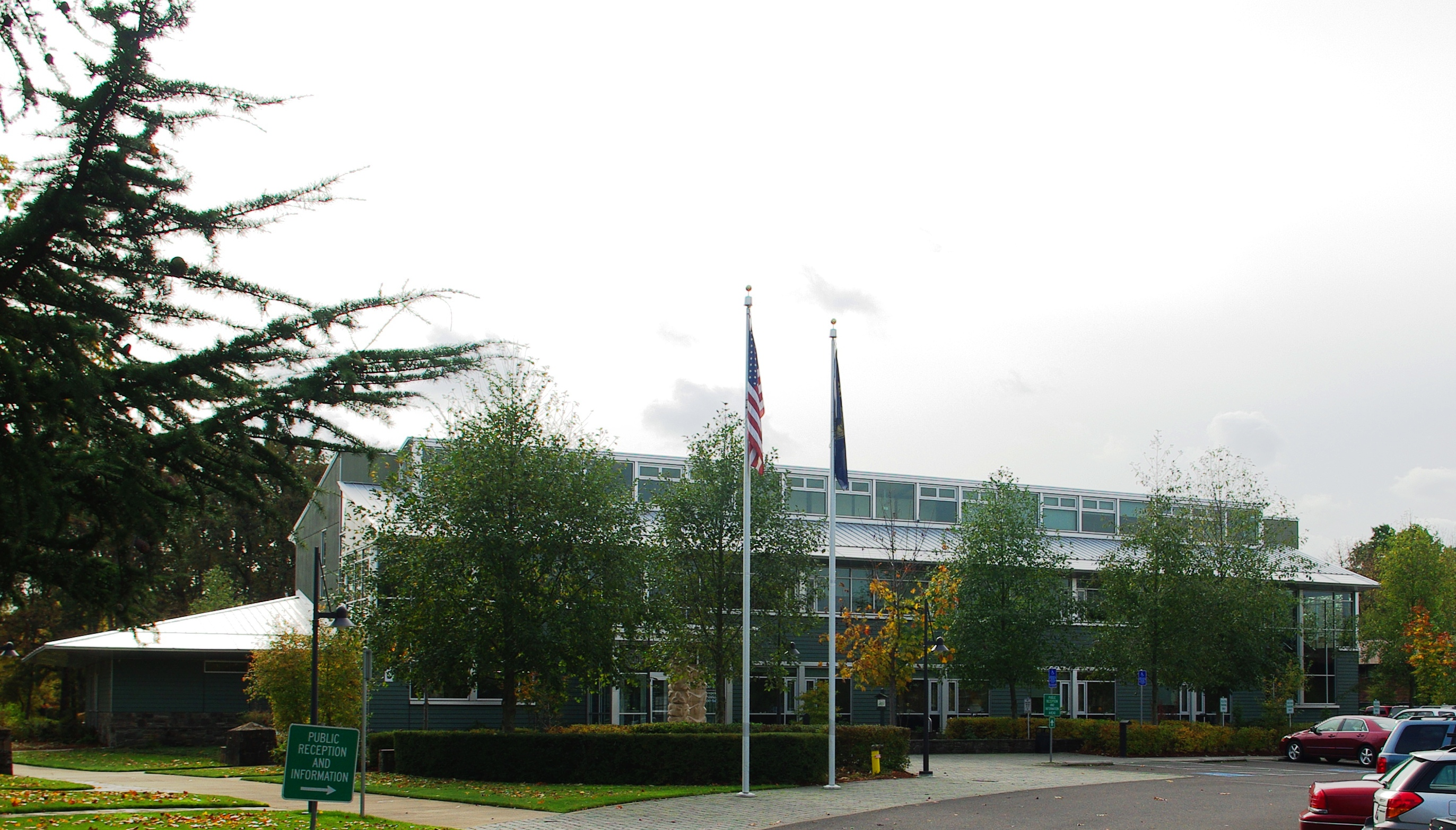
- Headquarters Office in Salem, 2009

Agency overview
- Formed: 1911
- Jurisdiction: State of Oregon
- Headquarters: Salem, Oregon
- Agency executive: Kacey KC, Oregon State Forester
- Parent agency: Oregon Board of Forestry
- Website: www.oregon.gov/ODF

The Oregon Department of Forestry (ODF) is the agency of the government of the U.S. state of Oregon which performs a wide variety of functions relating to the management, regulation and protection of both public and private forest lands in the state. It was established in 1911 with the creation of the State Board of Forestry, its governing board, and the office of State Forester, appointed by that Board. It has the broad mandate of the State Forester's charge to "act on all matters pertaining to forestry." Specific activities of the department include: forest fire prevention and protection; regulation of forest practices and promotion of forest stewardship; implementation of the Oregon Plan for Salmon and Watersheds; forest pest and disease detection and control; management of state-owned forestlands; nursery operation; forestry assistance to private woodland owners; forest resource research and planning; and community and urban forestry assistance.

Its second highest ranking manager and a state forester Mike Shaw was terminated in October 2024 following an investigation into sexual relationship with a female subordinate.

See also

- List of Oregon state forests
- Oregon Department of State Lands
