= Gilchrist, Oregon =

Unincorporated community in the state of Oregon, United States

- Unincorporated community
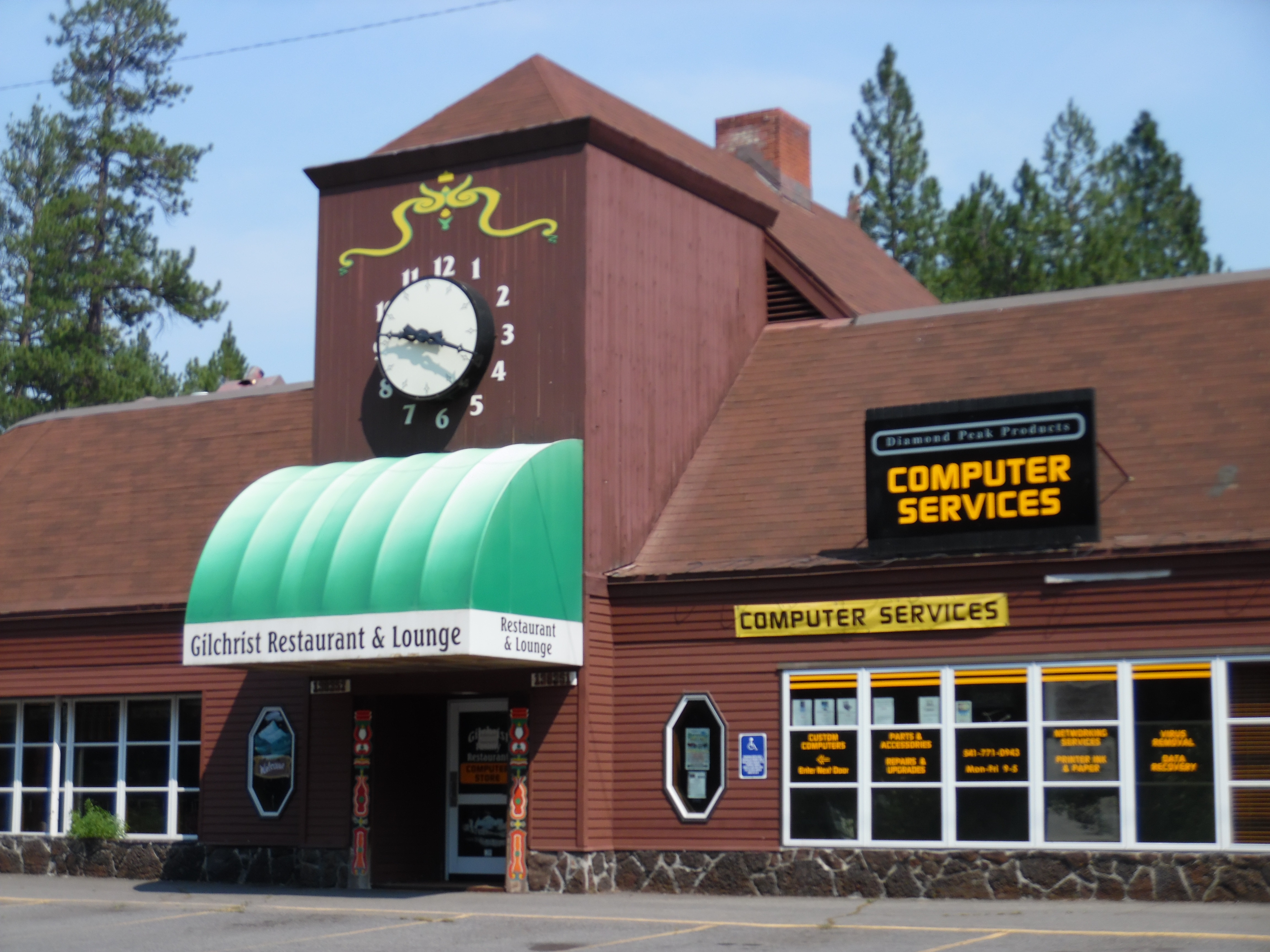
- Gilchrist Mall clock tower

- Location within Oregon and the United States Gilchrist (the United States)
- Coordinates: 43°28′30″N 121°41′26″W
- Country: United States
- State: Oregon
- County: Klamath

Area
  - Total: 0.42 sq mi (1.09 km^{2})
  - Land: 0.38 sq mi (0.98 km^{2})
  - Water: 0.042 sq mi (0.11 km^{2})
- Elevation: 4,452 ft (1,357 m)

Population (2020)
  - Total: 216
  - Density: 569.1/sq mi (219.75/km^{2})
- Time zone: UTC-8 (Pacific (PST))
  - Summer (DST): UTC-7 (PDT)
- ZIP code: 97737
- Area codes: 458 and 541
- FIPS code: 41-28800
- GNIS feature ID: 2805452

Gilchrist /ˈɡɪlkrɪst/ is a census-designated place in Klamath County, Oregon, United States. The community is located on U.S. Route 97 between Bend and Klamath Falls.

== History ==
Gilchrist was the last lumber company town in Oregon. The town was founded in 1938 by the family-owned Gilchrist Timber Company, with Frank and Mary Gilchrist as the owners and town founders. The mill moved there from Jasper County, Mississippi, in search of lumber and lower taxes, building a dam on the Little Deschutes River to create the mill pond. In 1939, Gilchrist School was built by the Public Works Administration.

The Gilchrist Mall was built in 1939. It was the first mall opened east of the Cascade Mountains. The mall included grocery store, post office, drugstore, barbershop, beauty parlor, liquor store, bowling alley, and a library. The mall also housed a club for Gilchrist Lumber Company employees. The club had a bar and lounge area, dance floor, pool tables, and a large meeting hall. While some of the businesses have changed over time, as of 2019 the mall buildings remain essentially unchanged.

The company was sold to Crown Pacific Partners in 1991, which subsequently fired all its employees. The 120 homes and other facilities in the town were subsequently sold to residents and others in 1997, with Crown Pacific retaining the sawmill and timberland. Prior to this sale, all houses in the town were painted in Gilchrist brown (with the exception of a small area on the north end of town called Rainbow Circle by its residents). The timberland and the town's sawmill, upgraded to handle smaller logs in 2000, were among the last remaining assets of Crown Pacific, which declared bankruptcy in 2003 and was taken over by creditors at the end of 2004, and again bought by Canadian company Interfor Pacific in 2006. As of 2009, the kindergarten through twelfth grade school had an enrollment of 238 students.

== Climate ==
This region experiences warm (but not hot) and dry summers, with no average monthly temperatures above 71.6 °F (22.0 °C). According to the Köppen Climate Classification system, Gilchrist has a warm-summer Mediterranean climate, abbreviated "Csb" on climate maps.

== Demographics ==
Historical population
Census	Pop.	Note	%±
2020	216		—
U.S. Decennial Census

== Education ==
It is within the Klamath County School District.

It is in the territory of Central Oregon Community College.
