= Oregon Board of Forestry =

- Oregon Department of Forestry seal

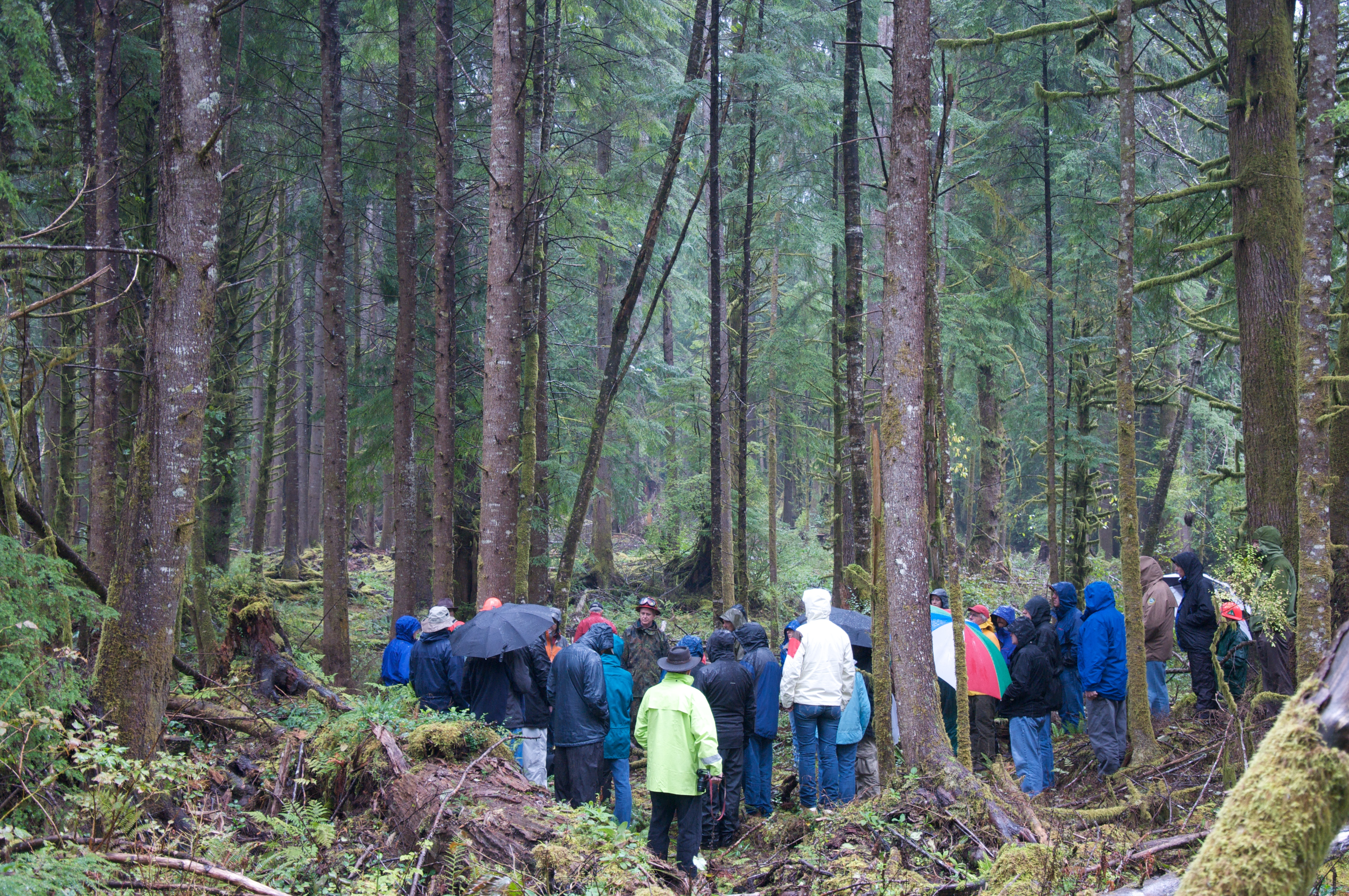
- Board of Forestry tour in 2009

Agency overview
- Formed: 1911
- Jurisdiction: State of Oregon
- Headquarters: Salem, Oregon
- Agency executive: Tom Imeson, board chairman
- Website: http://www.oregon.gov/ODF/BOARD

The Oregon Board of Forestry is responsible for forest policy and oversight of forest management practices within the state of Oregon. The board appoints the state forester and oversees the Oregon Department of Forestry. The board also works with private land owners and the Federal Government to promote consistent forest management policies throughout the state.

== History ==
Oregon began to centralize its forest management in 1905, when the state authorized local fire rangers to patrol Oregon counties and enforce the newly created fire protection laws. Two years later, the state established a temporary board to make recommendations to Oregon legislature regarding forests practices. As an advisory board, it had little power beyond its reports to the legislative assembly.

In 1911, the Oregon legislature formally established a state Department of Forestry with the Board of Forestry as its oversight body. Together these institutions were made responsible for enforcing forestry laws, managing state forest lands, preventing forest fires within the state, encouraging reforestation, and educating the public about good forestry practices.

Prior to 1939, the Board of Forestry shared the responsibility for state parks with the Oregon Highway Commission. In 1939, the Oregon Legislative made the Highway Commission solely responsible for state parks. At the same time, the Board of Forestry was given administration jurisdiction over the Forest Development Fund.

The first version of the Forestry Program for Oregon was published in 1977. It outlined a vision for Oregon's forests and established strategies priorities to guide the board's decisions. Since then, the board has periodically published new versions of the document to update management policies and refine forestry programs.

== Responsibility ==
Today, the Board of Forestry's mission is "to lead Oregon in implementing policies and programs that promote environmentally, economically, and socially sustainable management of Oregon’s 28,000,000 acres (110,000 km^{2}) of public and private forests." To achieve this, the Oregon legislature has empowered the board to establish forest policy within the state. The board adopts rules for the use of state and private forest lands consistent with Oregon statute. It regulates forest practices and oversees forestry programs within the state. The board appoints the state forester, and through state forester, oversees the state's Department of Forestry.

The board facilitates public debate on key issues of forest management. This includes timber harvest rules, environmental regulations, firefighting practices, and management priorities for use of state-owned forest lands. The board works with private land owners, Oregon counties, the United States Forest Service, the Bureau of Land Management, and other Federal agencies to promote consistent management policies and practices for all forest lands within the state. The Board of Forestry and the professional foresters in the Department of Forestry are responsible for managing Oregon's forest lands on behalf of the people of Oregon.

== Board organization ==
The Board of Forestry has seven members appointed by the Governor of Oregon and confirmed by the Oregon State Senate. Members serve a four-year term, and are limited to two consecutive terms. Oregon law requires the board to represent the broad interests of the Oregon public. Therefore, no more than three members of the board can receive a significant portion of their income from the forest products industry, and at least one member must reside in each of the three major forest regions of the state.

The Board of Forestry has three sub-committees made up of board members who are working on specific issues for the board. The subcommittees are created to consider specific issues and develop recommendations for the full board's consideration and action. The three subcommittees are the Federal Forests Subcommittee, the State Forests Financial Viability Subcommittee, and the Alternative Forest Management Plans Subcommittee.

The Federal Forests Subcommittee was created in January 2013 to help the board engage federal forestry offices, members of congress, and Oregon state legislators regarding issues arising from federal forest policy. The State Forests Financial Viability Subcommittee was also created in January 2013. It is responsible for helping the board understand and solve issues related to financial viability. The Alternative Forest Management Plans Subcommittee was established in June 2013 to evaluate alternative forest management plans. It was initially focused on the forest management in Oregon's northwest region.

== Advisory committees ==
The Board of Forestry has seven advisory committees made up of outside members who representative various forest and public interests. The advisory committees are Federal Forestlands Advisory Committee, the Forest Trust Land Advisory Committee, Family Forestlands Advisory Committee, Oregon Forest Resource Trust Advisory Committee, and three regional forest practice advisory committees.

Members of the Federal Forestlands Advisory Committee are appointed by the Oregon Board of Forestry. The committee was created to give Oregon citizens a greater role in the management of federal forest lands.

The Oregon Legislature established the Forest Trust Land Advisory Committee in 1987. The committee advises the Board of Forestry on management policy for state-owned forest lands. The committee is composed of the board of directors of Oregon's Council of Forest Trust Land Counties which represents counties with forest trust lands. The counties represented on the council are: Benton, Clackamas, Clatsop, Columbia, Coos, Douglas, Josephine, Klamath, Lane, Lincoln, Linn, Marion, Polk, Tillamook, and Washington.

The issues affecting family owned forest lands are complex including the increasing risk that those forest properties will be developed for residential or industrial use. The Family Forestlands Advisory Committee helps the Board of Forestry understand the needs of family forest land owners.

The 1993 Oregon Legislature established the Forest Resource Trust to finances reforestation. The Forest Resource Trust Advisory Committee to identify and recommend actions to improve and simplify the state's forest management process and build support among forest land owners.

There are also three regional forest practice committees to help the Board of Forestry develop appropriate forest management policies. Each committee has nine members. The regional committees represent northwest Oregon, southwest Oregon, and eastern Oregon.

== Forestry program ==
Sustainable forest management is the board's long-term goal. To achieve this, forest resources must be used, developed, and protected in a manner that enables people to meet their current environmental, economic, and social needs while ensuring that the needs of future generations will also be met.

The Board of Forestry publishes the Forestry Program for Oregon to guide forest management within the state. Since it was first published in 1977, "sustainability" has remained the forestry program's central theme. On a statewide basis, sustainable forest management creates a healthy and diverse forest ecosystem that produces abundant timber and other forest products. Habitat to support healthy populations of native plants and animals is maintained. It ensures productive soil, clean water, clean air, and recreational opportunities are protected. This balanced program supports Oregon's people and their communities both economically and socially. The Forestry Program for Oregon serves as a strategic guide for the Department of Forestry's day-to-day management decisions.
