= Crown Pacific Partners =

Crown Pacific Partners, L.P. was a publicly traded partnership founded in 1988 which at its peak owned about 800,000 acres (3,000 km^{2}) of timberland, half in Oregon and the rest in Washington, Idaho, and Montana. It also held several sawmills (including one in Gilchrist, Oregon), a wood chip plant, and lumber yards in the Pacific Northwest, with wholesale marketing and sales office in states such as California, Utah, and Arizona.

The partnership went public in 1994, trading under the stock symbol CRO on the New York Stock Exchange. It filed for Chapter 11 bankruptcy in June 2003, with its remaining assets, 520,000 acres (2,100 km^{2}) in Washington and Oregon, taken over by creditors in December 2004, who formed Cascade Timberlands, LLC.
