= Wood River (Oregon) =

River in Oregon, United States

Coordinates: 42.61806°N 121.96550°W

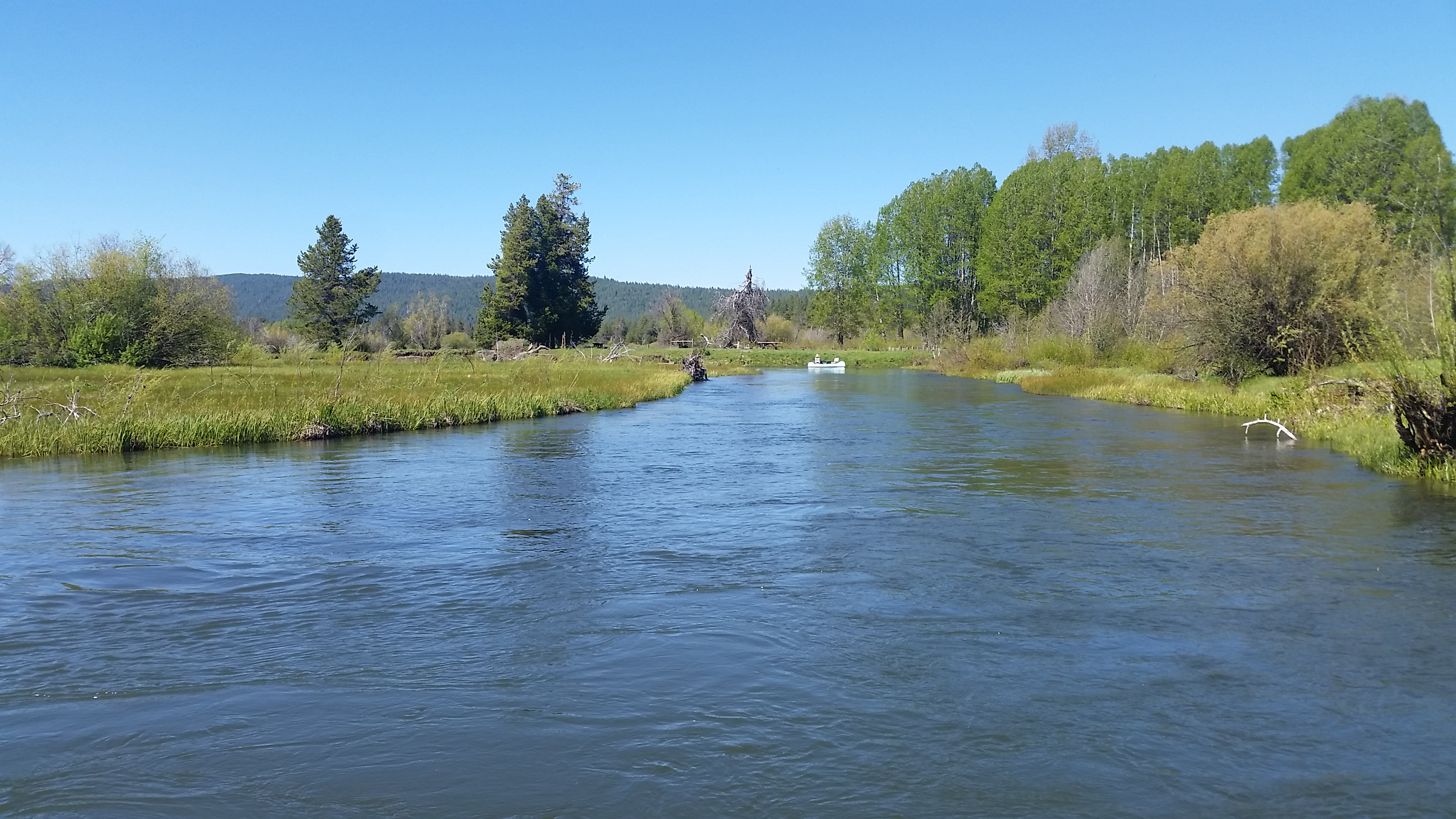
- The Wood River

Physical characteristics
- Source
  - location: Crater Lake watershed
  - elevation: 4,211 ft (1,284 m)
- Mouth
  - location: Agency Lake
  - elevation: 4,144 ft (1,263 m)
- Length: 18 mi (29 km)
- Basin size: 220 sq mi (570 km^{2})
- Discharge
  - average: 319 cu ft/s (9.0 m^{3}/s)

The Wood River is a short river in the southern region of the U.S. state of Oregon, and part of the Klamath Basin drainage. It flows 18 miles (29 km) through the Fremont-Winema National Forests, Bureau of Land Management land, and private property in southern Oregon. Its watershed consists of 220 square miles (570 km^{2}) of conifer forest, rural pasture land, and marsh. The river provides habitat for many species of wildlife including an adfluvial (migratory) and resident populations of native Great Basin redband trout.

== Course ==
The Wood River flows through Klamath County, Oregon with headwaters emanating from a large natural spring located in Jackson F. Kimball State Recreation Site. The aquifer that feeds the spring is believed to originate 20 miles (32 km) to the northwest in the east side drainage of Crater Lake National Park. The Wood River meanders through pine forest and agricultural land for 18 miles (29 km) before flowing into Agency Lake.

The Wood River's largest tributary is Annie Creek which originates inside the boundary of Crater Lake National Park, and is fed by the park's snowpack as well as groundwater from natural springs. After leaving the park, Annie Creek passes through the Fremont-Winema National Forests and then runs along the western border of Sun Pass State Forest for about a mile. It then crosses private pastureland and is joined by Sun Creek before joining the Wood River, about a mile south of Kimball State Recreation Site.

From there, the Wood runs south through the Fremont-Winema National Forests and private pasture land before Fort Creek joins the flow. Below Fort Creek, the river flows through private pasture land and then opens into a wide marsh. Much of the original marsh is now pasture land. Water from the river is diverted into a system of canals to irrigate grazing land in the surrounding valley. Finally, Crooked Creek joins the Wood approximately one mile before it empties into Agency Lake, which is connected to Upper Klamath Lake.

=== Discharge ===
The average discharge of the Wood River at its mouth is 319 cubic feet per second (9.0 m^{3}/s).

== Watershed ==
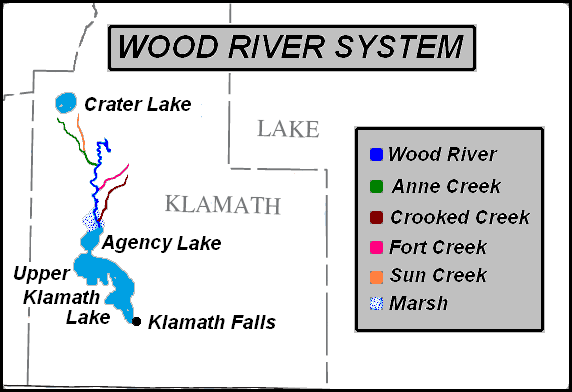
Wood River drainage basin

The Wood River watershed drains 220 square miles (570 km^{2}) forest land in the Cascade Mountains southeast of Crater Lake and the Wood River Valley. The drainage around its headwaters is forest country dominated by ponderosa pine and lodgepole pine with some quaking aspen in meadow lands. Annie Creek drains steep alpine forest country. From near its headwaters to the border of Crater Lake National Park, the creek has cut a deep canyon through the forest that is a well known feature within the park. After leaving the park, Annie Creek flows into flat meadow lands on the western border of Sun Pass State Forest. Annie Creek also feeds several irrigation canals including Scott Ditch, Shattuck Ditch, Loosely-Streeter-Cardwell Ditch, and Copeland Lateral Ditch. Excess flow from these canals is returned to Annie Creek and the Wood River. The lower Wood River flows through pasture land and ultimately opens into a large marsh before draining into Agency Lake.

== History ==
In 1863, the United States Army established Fort Klamath near the Wood River in south central Oregon. Soldiers constructed a sawmill on Fort Creek, and use the lumber it produced to build officers quarters, troop barracks, a guardhouse and arsenal, a small hospital, a bakery, stables, and other structures. To the north of the post, the army planted 3,000 acres (12 km^{2}) of grass to supply fodder for it horses and mules. The fort was abandoned in 1889. None of the original buildings remain today.

== River habitat ==
The Wood River habitat supports wild, self-sustaining populations of brook, brown, Great Basin redband, and coastal rainbow trout. These species are widely distributed throughout the river system from the headwaters to Agency Lake. Bull trout are native to upper Sun Creek inside Crater Lake National Park. Great Basin redband trout and coastal rainbow trout are species, both rainbow trout subspecies, native to the Klamath basin. The Wood River Species Management Unit (SMU) for redband trout is considered secure by the Oregon Department of Fish and Wildlife.

Annie Creek and Sun Creek are extremely important because of the relative rarity of water and riparian habitat in the area. Both creeks are classified as a large, fish-bearing stream under provisions of Oregon Forest Practices Act. This reserves sufficient stream flow to support aquatic life, but does not override the most senior water rights.

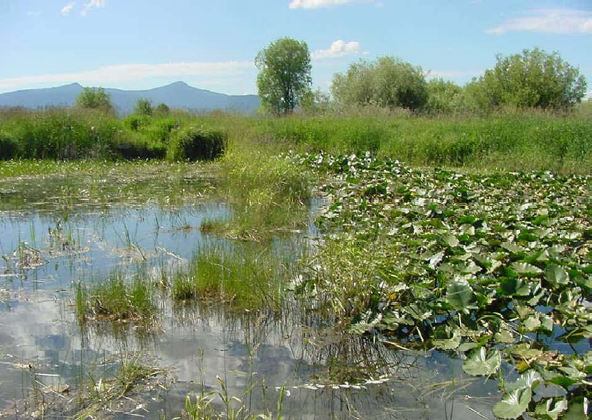
Restored Wood River Wetland near Agency Lake

In addition to the fish habitat, the Wood River valley supports a diverse population of nesting ducks, shorebirds, and migratory songbirds. These include wood ducks, mallards, cinnamon teal, Canada geese, mergansers, American coots, common snipes, mourning doves, killdeer, great egrets, meadowlarks, and yellow warblers. The area also supports nesting populations of bald eagles, ospreys, and northern harriers.

The waterway provides habitat for river wildlife including beaver, river otter, and muskrats. The river also supports non-aquatic animals. Common animals in the Wood River area include raccoons, gray squirrels, martens, mink, red fox, gray fox, mule deer, bobcats, and black bear. Domestic beef cattle are common in the Wood River Valley.

In September 1992, U.S. Congress appropriated funds for the Bureau of Land Management to purchase 3,200 acres (13 km^{2}) of natural wetland along the north end of Agency Lake at the mouth of the Wood River. This wetland area was converted to pasture land in the 1950s and 1960s. The land purchase was completed in 1994. Since acquiring the Wood River property, the Bureau of Land Management has successfully restored the wetland area and adjacent Wood River channel to a more natural state. The channel restoration project was completed in 2001. The new channel meanders through the marsh, increasing the length of the Wood River by over one half mile. Overall, this project has improved water quality and created better habitat for fish, birds, and wildlife.

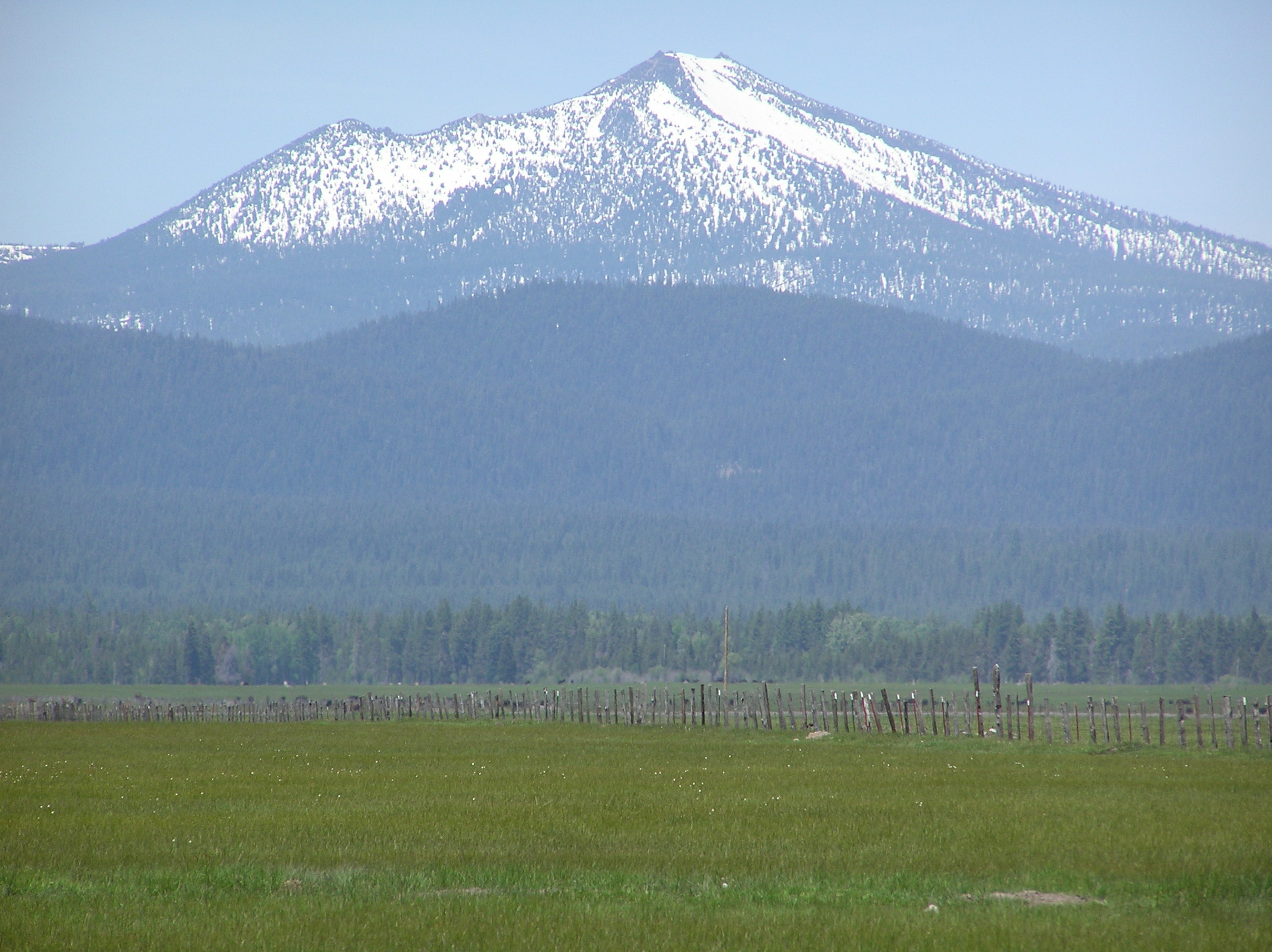
Wood River valley

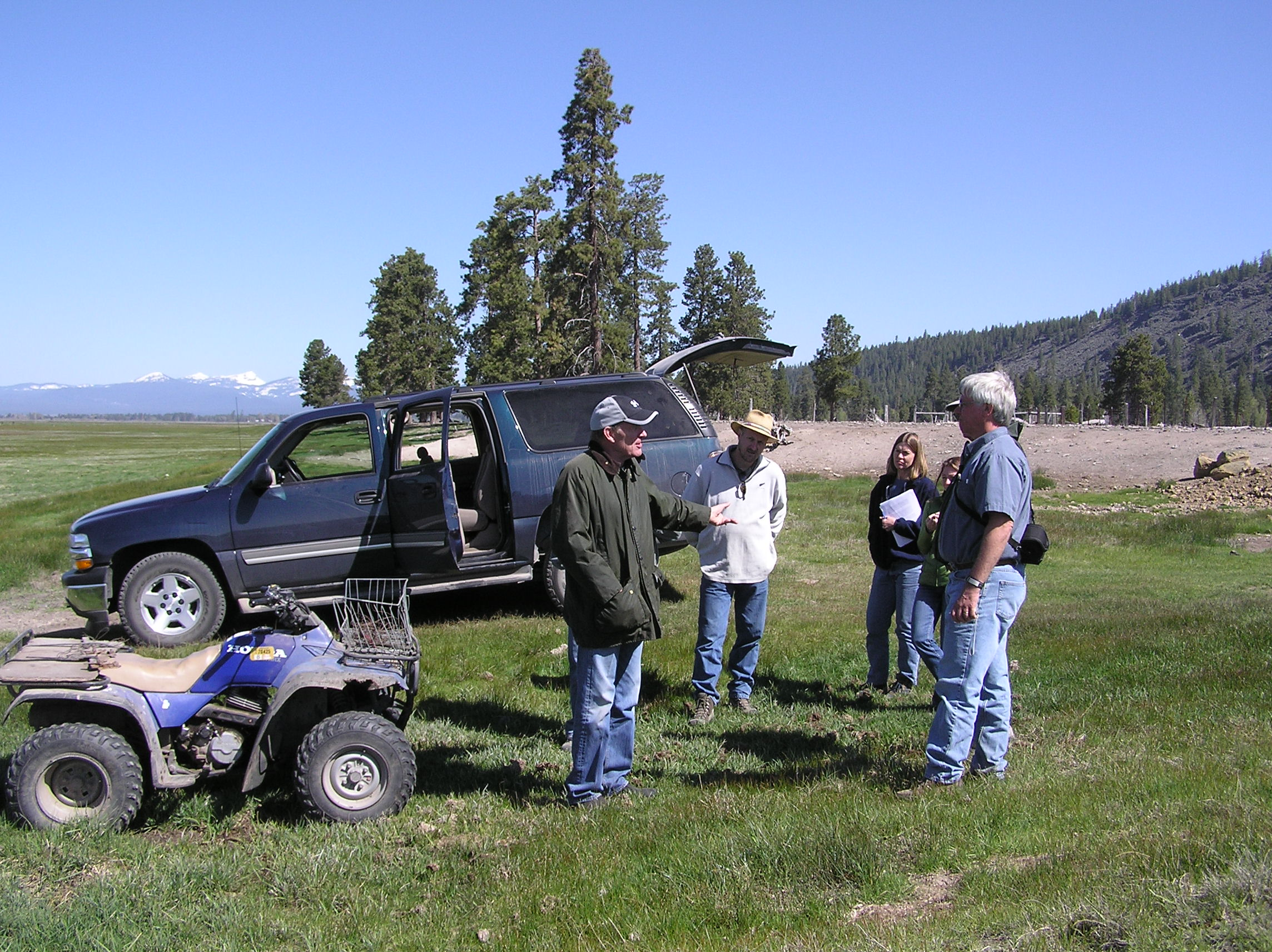
Site monitoring team

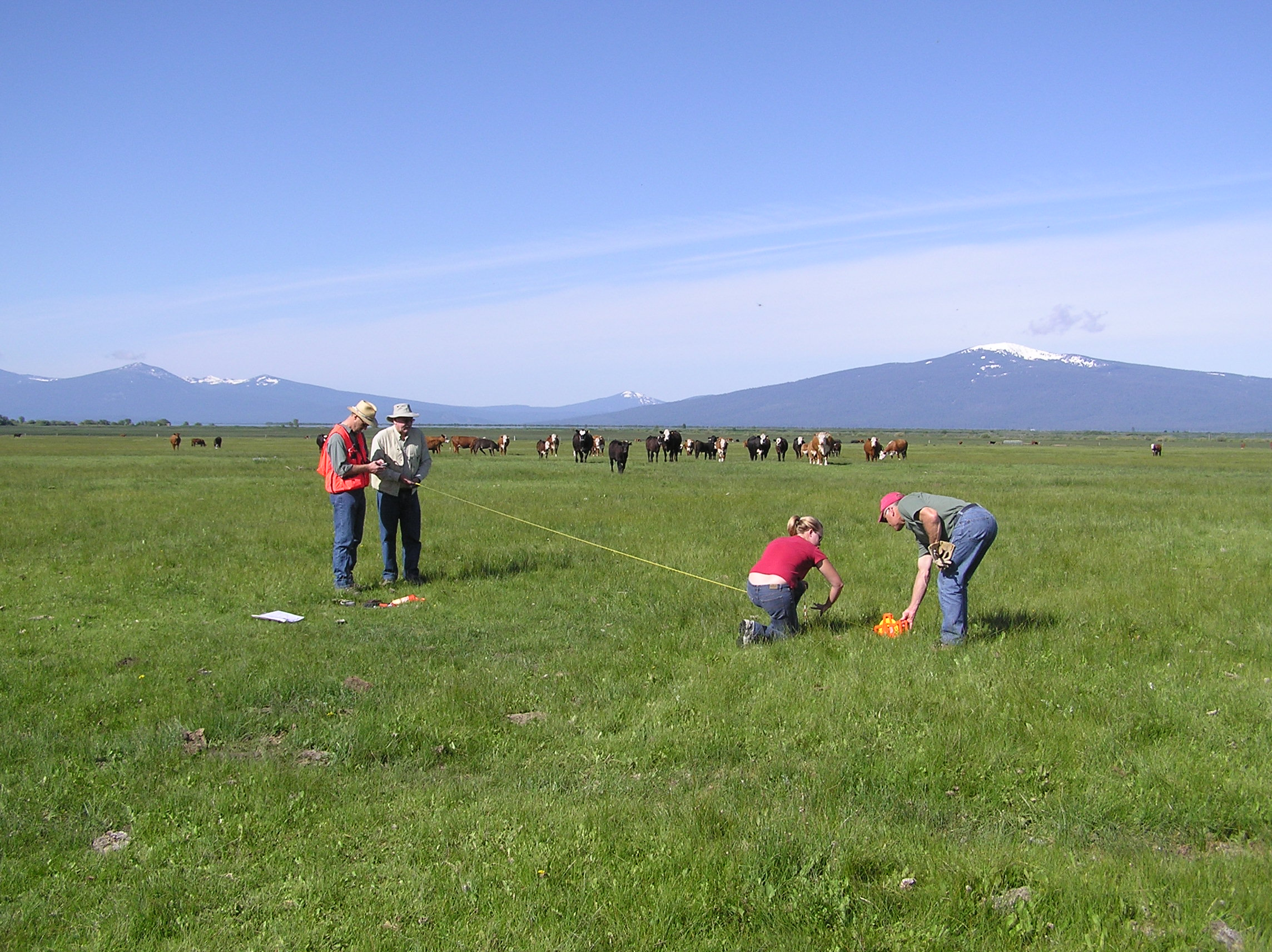
Vegetation survey

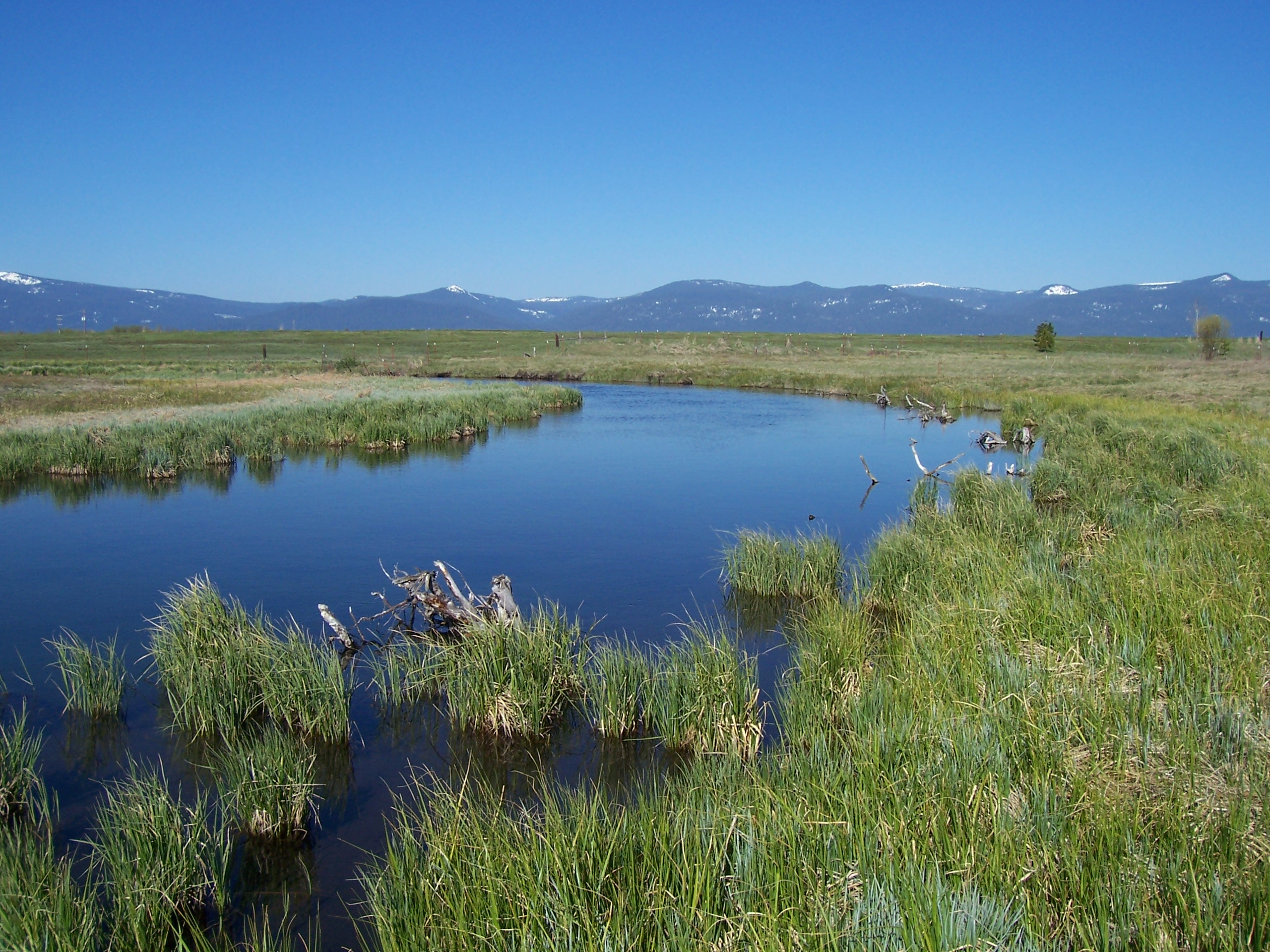
Healthy channel

== Recreation ==
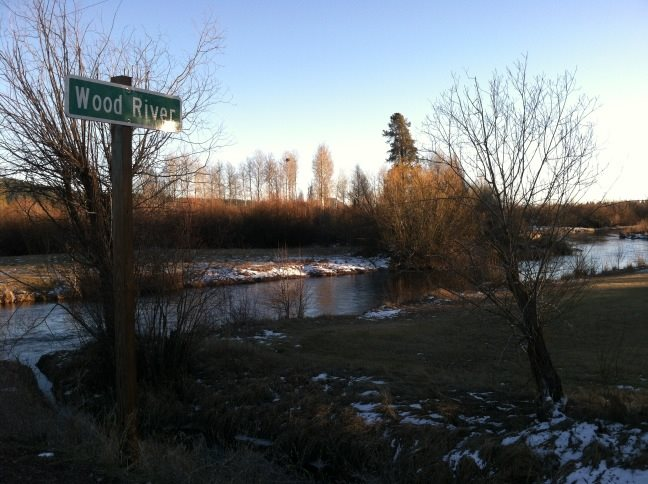
River access off Oregon Route 62

There are several recreation sites along the Wood River. Jackson F. Kimball State Recreation Site has a day-use picnic area and ten campsites. Water activities like fishing, canoeing, and kayaking are available. A short trail connects the main campground to the Wood River's headwaters spring. The park is located just off Oregon Route 62, approximately 20 miles (32 km) southeast of Crater Lake National Park, and 40 miles (64 km) northwest of Klamath Falls, Oregon.

The Fremont-Winema National Forest maintains a day use site along the Wood River. The Forest Service site provides access to hiking trails and shoreline fishing. It also has picnic tables and restrooms, but visitors must bring their own drinking water. The site is located 33-mile (53 km) north of Klamath Falls on Sun Pass Road, a mile off Highway 62 (also known as Crater Lake Highway).

At the mouth of the Wood River, the Bureau of Land Management maintains the 3,200-acre (13 km^{2}) Wood River Wetland area. The Wood River Wetland is open year-round for day use activities including fishing, canoeing, kayaking, bird and wildlife watching, and waterfowl hunting in season. Facilities include a paved parking area, restrooms, picnic areas, nature trails, a canoe launch, and interpretive signs; however, there is no drinking water at the site. Motorized vehicles are not allowed beyond the parking area. During hunting season, the Wood River Wetland opens two hours before sunrise and closes a half-hour after sunset. The entrance to the Wood River Wetland is just off Modoc Point Road, 26-mile (42 km) north of Klamath Falls.

Wood River offers excellent fishing that can be accessed from the shore or by canoe or kayak. Brook, brown, and Great Basin redband and coastal rainbow trout are found in the Wood River and its tributaries.
