= Agency Lake =

Lake in Oregon, United States

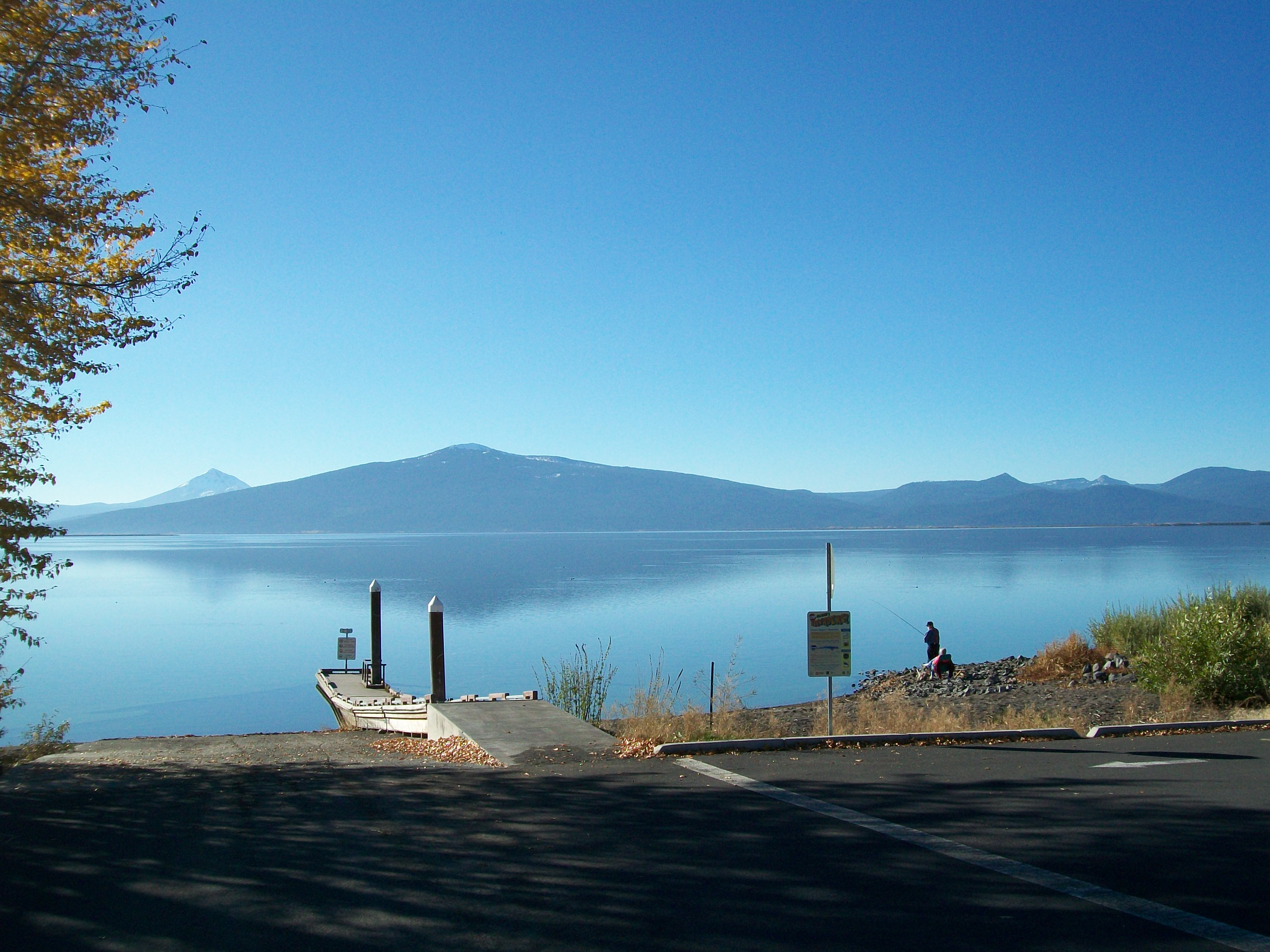
- Dock on East shore of Agency Lake. Mount McLoughlin in the far left.

- Location within Oregon Location within the United States
- Location: Klamath County, Oregon
- Coordinates: 42°31′56″N 121°57′54″W
- Primary inflows: Wood River
- Primary outflows: Upper Klamath Lake
- Catchment area: 244 mi^{2} (630 km^{2})
- Basin countries: United States
- Surface area: 9,298 acres (3,763 ha)
- Average depth: 3 ft (0.91 m)
- Max. depth: 7 ft (2.1 m)
- Water volume: 28,172 acre⋅ft (34,750 dam^{3})
- Residence time: 2 months
- Shore length^{1}: 25.7 mi (41.4 km)
- Surface elevation: 4,144 feet (1,263 m)
- ^{1} Shore length is not a well-defined measure.

Agency Lake is a natural lake located west of Chiloquin in Klamath County, Oregon. It is actually the northern arm of Upper Klamath Lake, connected by a narrow channel. Its primary inflow is the Wood River, while its outflow is Upper Klamath Lake (indirectly the Link River, Upper Klamath Lake's outflow). The lake has a surface area of approximately 9,000 acres (36 km^{2}). The lake is very shallow, and experiences high winds. [Modoc Point Road] runs along the east side. Agency Lake Resort is located on the east side of the lake.

== Wetland restoration ==
The Bureau of Land Management (BLM) has been working to restore 3,000 acres (12 km^{2}) of wetland near the mouth of the Wood River since 1997. The wetlands were damaged in the 1960s and 70s when water was diverted for farmland. The BLM also plans to add walking trails and picnic areas.

== Flora and fauna ==
The most common type of fish in the lake are trout, especially Great Basin redband trout. Over 50 species of birds live on or near the lake.

== Recreation ==
Fishing is a popular activity on the lake. Six boat ramps are located on the lake. The Agency Lake Resort, located on the lake's eastern shore, features a campground with 40 campsites, marina, boat ramp, and convenience store.

Agency Lake can be accessed by boat or canoe from the marshes route off Malone Springs.

== See also ==
- List of lakes in Oregon
