= Pelican Butte =

Mountain in Oregon, United States

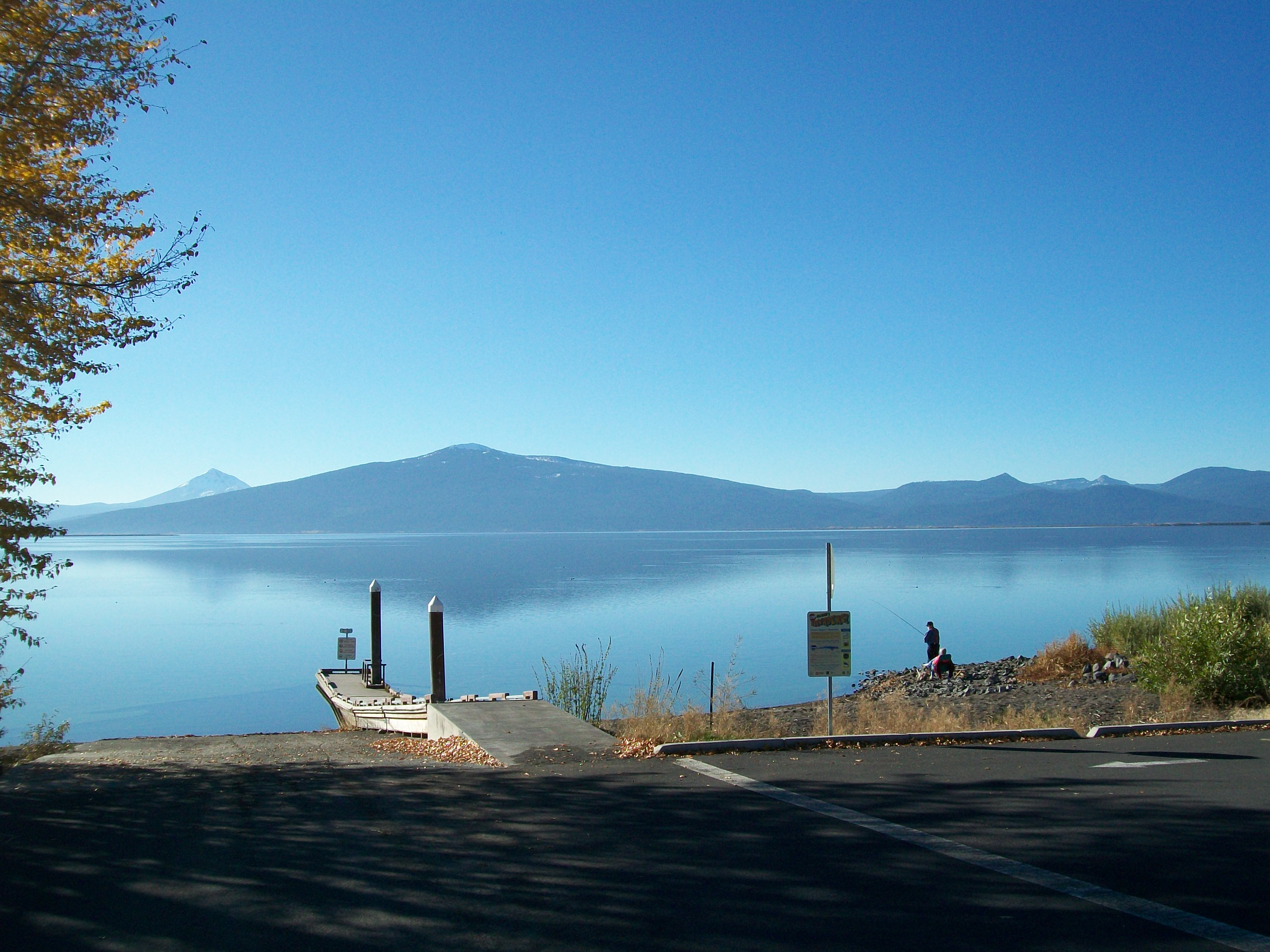
- Pelican Butte from across Agency Lake

Highest point
- Elevation: 8,037 ft (2,450 m) NAVD 88
- Coordinates: 42°30′48″N 122°08′43″W

Geography
- Location: Klamath County, Oregon, U.S.
- Parent range: Cascades
- Topo map: USGS Pelican Butte

Geology
- Rock age: Pleistocene
- Mountain type: Shield volcano
- Volcanic arc: Cascade Volcanic Arc
- Last eruption: Pleistocene

Climbing
- Easiest route: Dirt road

Pelican Butte is a steep-sided shield volcano in the Cascade Range of southern Oregon, United States. It is located 28 mi (45 km) due south of Crater Lake and 12 mi (19 km) northeast of Mount McLoughlin. Pelican Butte is the most prominent shield volcano in the southern Oregon Cascades and has a large volume at 4.8 cu mi (20 km^{3}), making it one of the bigger Quaternary volcanoes in the region, approaching the size of some of the range's stratovolcanoes. While still part of the Cascades, Pelican Butte is disconnected from the main axis, forming above faults along the eastern border of the range. Pelican Butte is part of the Quaternary Mount McLoughlin Reach, a volcanic vent zone that runs from the volcano to Aspen Lake, encompassing 33 vents over an area of 357 sq mi (925 km^{2}). Ice age glaciers carved a large cirque into the northeast flank of the mountain, but despite this erosion, its original shape is largely preserved. Several proposals have been made over the last few decades for the development of a ski area on this flank, with none implemented.

Dating for eruptive activity at Pelican Butte is unclear, ranging from less than 200,000 years ago to no more than 700,000 years ago. These eruptive episodes built a summit cone with tuff breccia and lapilli, later covered by lava flows before it was eroded. Eruptions began as explosive events and became thinner with ʻaʻā and block lava.

Pelican Butte is within the Fremont-Winema National Forest and forms part of the Sky Lakes Wilderness. A variety of flora and fauna live on and in the vicinity of the mountain. Named after nearby Pelican Bay at the north end of Upper Klamath Lake, Pelican Butte was also known by Native Americans as Mongina; the United States Coast and Geodetic Survey previously listed it under the name Lost Peak. Ancestral Native American groups related to the Klamath and Takelma people first hunted and gathered huckleberries in the area thousands of years ago. The Sky Lakes Wilderness area eventually became a popular location for white settlers to hunt, trap beaver and marten, and graze stock. A fire lookout tower is present on the summit of the volcano and is maintained by the United States Forest Service. A gravel road runs up to the summit of the mountain from Oregon Route 140.

== Geography ==
Pelican Butte is located in Klamath County in southeastern Oregon near Fish Lake. It is about 28 mi (45 km) south of Crater Lake National Park and 12 mi (19 km) northeast of Mount McLoughlin. It is accessible from Oregon Highway 140. Located within the Fremont–Winema National Forest, Pelican Butte is part of the Sky Lakes Wilderness, which encompasses 113,849 acres (460.73 km^{2}) of land in southern Oregon operated by the United States Forest Service. The wilderness area ranges in elevation from 3,800 to 9,495 feet (1,158 to 2,894 m).

While still part of the Cascade Range, Pelican Butte is disconnected from the main axis, having formed above a network of normal faults that mark the eastern border of the Cascades. The volcano reaches an elevation of 8,037 ft (2,450 m).^{[a]} Pelican Butte has steep sides, and despite erosion from glaciers, its original shape is mostly preserved. During the Pleistocene epoch (from circa 2.58 million to 11,700 years ago), glaciers formed a canyon and a cirque on the northeastern side of the volcano; they also reduced the summit elevation several tens of meters and carved out an intrusive conduit in the volcano. The volcano is no longer heavily glaciated.

Pelican Butte has a large volume at 4.8 cu mi (20 km^{3}), making it one of the bigger Quaternary volcanoes in the region of Crater Lake and Mount Shasta. Its volume makes it one of the largest shield volcanoes in the Cascades, approaching the size of some of the range's stratovolcanoes. It is about 33 percent larger than Mount McLoughlin. Pelican Butte is the most prominent shield volcano in the southern Oregon Cascades.

== Ecology ==
On the volcano, at about 4,430 ft (1,350 m) elevation, Douglas fir and Ponderosa pine trees dominate. At an elevation of 5,410 ft (1,650 m), the Shasta red fir dominates certain areas; at elevations of 5,740 ft (1,750 m), the red fir as well as white fir become predominant. Close to the summit, endangered western white pine trees support populations of Clark's nutcrackers and gray jays. Mountain hemlock is also common at higher elevations, while lodgepole pines are more dominant around the Sky Lakes wilderness area's subalpine lakes; Engelmann spruce is also found sporadically. The understory of forest consists of huckleberry, snowbrush, heather, and manzanita.

Animals that live in the Sky Lakes Wilderness include elk in the summer to early fall, American martens, American black bears, cougars, coyotes, pikas, golden-mantled ground squirrels, and ospreys. In a study of relationships between the northern spotted owl and its prey species, scientists identified animals including the northern flying squirrel, Bushy-tailed woodrat, and voles as living at Pelican Butte. Less common prey animals included deer mice and Townsend's chipmunk as well as insects. American bald eagles also live on the mountain. Some of the lakes in the area are stocked with game fish. Klamath Lake near Pelican Butte is home to sucker fish, including the Klamath largescale sucker, the Klamath smallscale sucker, and the endangered Lost River sucker and shortnose sucker.

== Geology ==
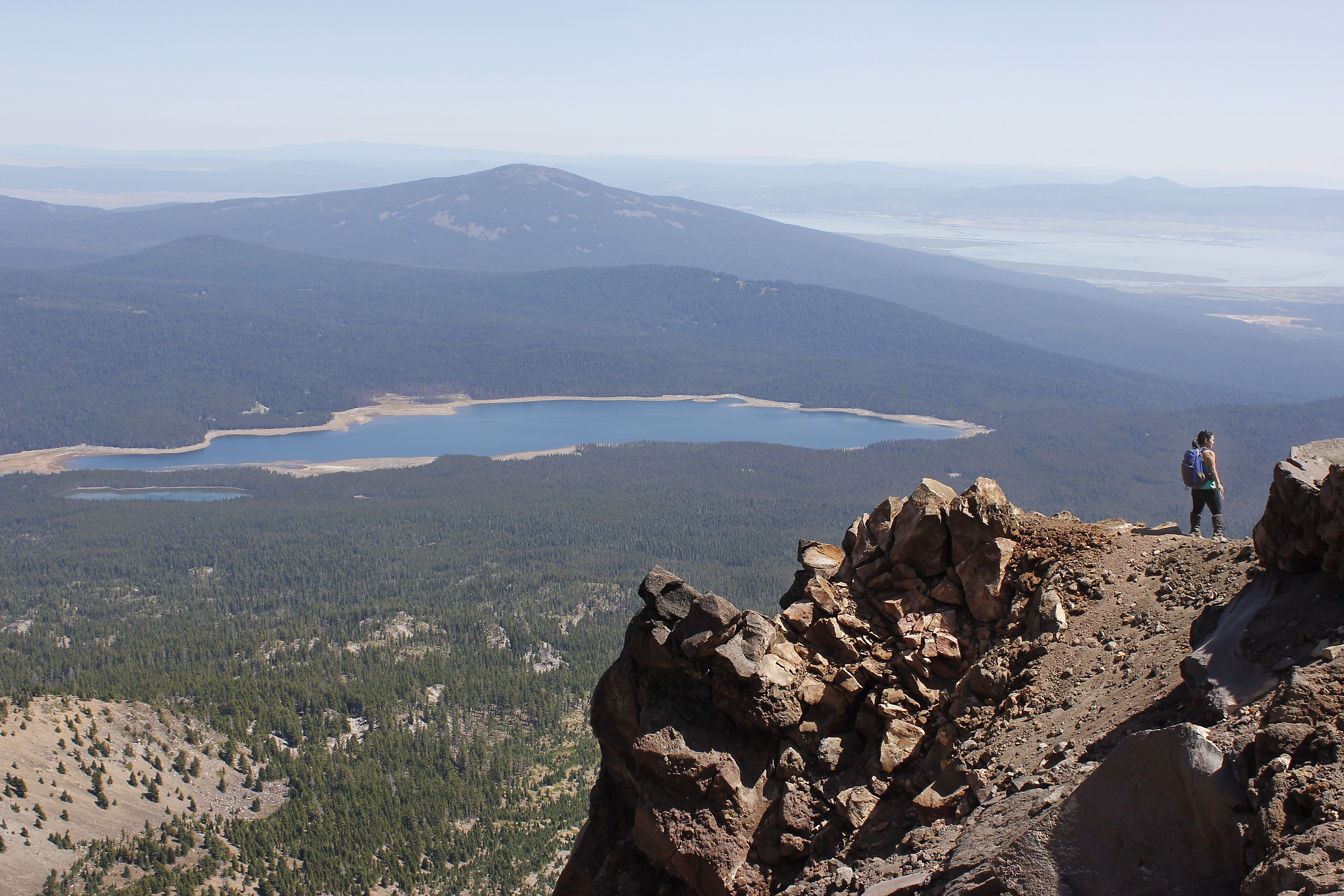
Pelican Butte as seen from Mount McLoughlin

Pelican Butte is part of the Quaternary Mount McLoughlin Reach, a volcanic vent zone that runs from the volcano to Aspen Lake, encompassing 33 vents over an area of 357 sq mi (925 km^{2}). The vent zone ranges from 9.3 to 15.5 mi (15 to 25 km) in width. Compared to the nearby vent zone surrounding Mount Mazama, it has a lower density of volcanic vents, no dacitic or silicic volcanic rock, and a lower volume of eruptive material produced during the Quaternary. Basaltic andesite is the predominant volcanic rock in the McLoughlin Reach, though Pelican Butte is andesitic in composition along with nearby Brown Mountain and the dissected Devils Peak volcanic cone.

The continuity of the Quaternary Cascade arc is interrupted at several points, including a potential gap between Pelican Butte and the Big Bunchgrass shield volcano to the north. Running for 11 mi (17 km) in length, the reach has fewer volcanic vents than the rest of the Quaternary Cascades, including 10 eroded mafic vents that have been dated to the Pliocene or early Quaternary. Northward of this reach, the Quaternary Cascades run continuously for 310 mi (500 km).

Pelican Butte is a shield volcano. It sits on basaltic andesite erupted during the Pliocene and early Pleistocene. Samples from the volcano have 58 to 60 percent silica, and the volcano is made up of calc-alkaline basaltic andesite and andesite lava with normal polarity. For the lower volcano, thick lava flows followed existing channels and formed glassy deposits with phenocrysts including plagioclase, augite, hypersthene, and olivine. These phenocrysts are relatively sparse among the lava flows. A second type of andesitic lava created thinner flows with blocks and scoria closer to the summit of the volcano. With a finer grain and vesicular texture, the lava has phenocrysts of white plagioclase with sodic labradorite as well as olivine, augite, and hypersthene. It is believed that the volcano is made up of breccia based on eroded areas with exposure of the material between lava flows, though breccia is not well-exposed elsewhere on the mountain. Near the summit of Pelican Butte, tuff breccia and lapilli sit near the summit, which are partly covered by andesitic lava flows that have been eroded over time. The summit of Pelican Butte also has a cinder cone.

Eruptive material at the volcano includes basalt and andesite, with minerals including plagioclase feldspar, olivine, clinopyroxene, and orthopyroxene. The lava flows range in color from black to dark-blue-gray with relatively few phenocrysts and a glassy appearance. Along the southwestern flank of the volcano, pyroxene basaltic andesite deposits form outcrops that have been weathered into spheres. These outcrops typically range from 50 to 60 ft (15 to 18 m) in length, rarely exceeding 90 ft (27 m), forming ridges that range from 20 to 30 ft (6.1 to 9.1 m) in width. One andesitic deposit with block lava has a vesicular texture with zeolite. Vesicular lava flows are frequently observed near the summit of the volcano with white plagioclase phenocrysts made of sodic labradorite. In general, basaltic andesite deposits are 75–80% plagioclase, 8–10% clinopyroxene, and 8–10% orthopyroxene, with olivine ranging from 2–5%, typically occurring in an altered form as iddingsite. For the vesicular andesite, up to 15% of phenocrysts are olivine, augite, and hypersthene, with a maximum length of 0.071 in (1.8 mm). The other andesitic lava is nonvesicular and traveled further down the sides of the volcano. These deposits are more aphyric (lacking any phenocrysts) and have a blue gray color with thin white streaks running subparallel to flows. The phenocrysts for these flows include plagioclase, augite, hypersthene, and olivine.

There is one distinct geochemical sample with a higher nickel and chromium content than other lava erupted by the volcano, which may reflect heterogeneity in the source for the erupted material. The volcanic rock in the intrusive conduit in Pelican Butte's central vent is identical to the lava flows found in the Pelican Butte deposits. A fault scarp sits adjacent to lava flows on the western flank of the volcano, though the fault did not move the deposits, suggesting this lava was erupted 1.17 million years ago.

=== Nearby features ===
Imagination Peak is a scoria cone with lava flows northwest of Pelican Butte. Imagination Peak and Brown Mountain are both part of the McLoughlin Reach with Pelican Butte. Brown Mountain is also a shield volcano with a volume of 1 cu mi (4.2 km^{3}). Dated to between 60,000 and 12,000 years old, it produced basaltic andesite lava flows that have not been heavily eroded, but during Pleistocene glacial advance, ice streams on the volcano ate away at the cinder cone that formed Brown Mountain's summit. This formed a glacial cirque with a bowl shape on the northeastern flank. The Global Volcanism Program of the Smithsonian Institution does not list any specific subfeatures for Pelican Butte.

== Eruptive history ==
Pelican Butte last erupted within the past 700,000 years. Dating for its last eruptive activity is unclear; it has clearly not erupted since it was covered by glaciers about 12,000 years ago, and likely not in the past 60,000 years. According to Wood and Kienle (1990), most eruptions took place less than 200,000 years ago. However, Gorman (1994) reports that K–Ar dating of the summit places the volcano at 540,000 years old. According to the Global Volcanism Program, Pelican Butte has not erupted since the Pleistocene. In general, Pelican Butte and other andesitic volcanoes in the McLoughlin reach are not thought to be long-lived eruptive centers, though when combined their erupted material surpasses the eruptive volume of longer-lived mafic volcanoes like Mount McLoughlin. It is unclear whether the volcano is extinct or dormant.

Eruptions at Pelican Butte built a summit cone with tuff breccia and lapilli during pyroclastic eruptive activity, which was mostly covered by lava flows before it was eroded over time by glaciation, which lowered the cone's elevation significantly. Eruptive activity at Pelican Butte was mildly explosive, later switching to thinner flows with ʻaʻā and block lava.

== Human history ==
Pelican Butte is named after nearby Pelican Bay, at the north end of Upper Klamath Lake. It was also known by Native Americans as Mongina; the United States Coast and Geodetic Survey previously listed it under the name Lost Peak. Ancestral Native American groups related to the Klamath and Takelma people first hunted and gathered huckleberries in the area thousands of years ago. Mountains in the Cascades sometimes served as the setting for the rite of passage vision quests among young Klamath Native Americans. When white settlers reached the area, they began hunting, trapping beaver and marten, and grazing stock in the Sky Lakes wilderness area. The United States Forest Service began building trails and fire lookouts during the early 20th century.

Pelican Butte has a fire lookout that first consisted of an L-4 lookout on a cable pole tower. L-4 lookouts were the most popular live-in fire lookout and appeared as one of three variants: with a 14 by 14 ft (4.3 by 4.3 m) frame cab with windows on each side, on the ground, or on top of towers up to 100 ft (30 m) in height. The original fire lookout was replaced in 1954 by a timber tower, which was replaced again in 1966 with an R6 lookout on a timber tower. R6 lookouts came as a 15 by 15 ft (4.6 by 4.6 m) frame lookout with a flat roof that went beyond the cabin edges for shade. The current metal lookout tower was built in 1986 and is maintained by the United States Forest Service. Located at an elevation of 7,994 ft (2,437 m), it was voted the ugliest fire lookout in the state of Oregon by members of the Forest Fire Lookout Association.

The United States Congress designated the Sky Lakes Wilderness area, which includes Pelican Butte, in 1984. The area includes the Waldo Tree, which was inscribed by politician and Oregon Supreme Court Chief Justice John B. Waldo in 1888, as well as Twin Ponds Trail, which follows the same route as a military wagon road from the 1860s.

== Recreation ==
A gravel road runs to the summit of the mountain, branching north off Oregon Route 140. The road is only open during snow-free months during the summer. The last few miles of the road are steep and narrow, but are accessible by vehicles with high ground clearance. The peak of Pelican Butte offers a 180 degree view of the Cascades stretching from south of Crater Lake to Mount McLoughlin. A winter-use trail for the volcano is operated by the Klamath Basin Snowdrifters Snowmobile Club. The Pacific Crest Trail passes through the Sky Lakes wilderness area, running about 35 miles (56 km) in length.

Pelican Butte has been the focus of perennial efforts to develop a ski resort on the mountain since the 1960s. These efforts were consistently opposed by the U.S. Fish and Wildlife Service and local residents. During the 1990s and into 2001, Jeld-Wen invested more than USD 4 million dollars in planning for a ski area on Pelican Butte. As of 2017, there were no plans to develop a ski area on the mountain according to an official representing the Fremont-Winema National Forest administration.

== Notes ==
- [a] The U.S. National Geodetic Survey lists the elevation of Pelican Butte as 8,037 feet (2,450 m). However, the Geographic Names Information System lists its elevation as 8,015 feet (2,443 m), and the Global Volcanism Program of the Smithsonian Institution lists the Pelican Butte summit elevation as 8,035 feet (2,449 m).

== Sources ==
- Cutler, T.L.; Hays, D.W. (Autumn 1991). "Food Habits of Northern Spotted Owls in High Elevation Forests of Pelican Butte, Southwestern Oregon". Northwestern Naturalist. 72 (2): 66–69. doi:10.2307/3536802. JSTOR 3536802.
- Gorman, C. (April 1, 1994). Petrology and geochemistry of the Pelican Butte area, S. Oregon. North-Central Section of the Geological Society of America. Geological Society of America. pp. 137–140. OSTI 7141004.
- Harris, S. L. (2005). Fire Mountains of the West: The Cascade and Mono Lake Volcanoes (3rd ed.). Mountain Press Publishing Company. ISBN 0-87842-511-X.
- Hildreth, W. (2007). Quaternary Magmatism in the Cascades, Geologic Perspectives. United States Geological Survey. Professional Paper 1744.
- Wood, C. A.; Kienle, J., eds. (1990). Volcanoes of North America. Cambridge University Press. ISBN 0-521-43811-X.
- McArthur, L. A.; McArthur, L. L. (1992) [1928]. Oregon Geographic Names (6th ed.). Portland, Oregon: Oregon Historical Society Press. ISBN 978-0-87595-237-6.
- Smith, J. G. (1988). Geologic map of the Pelican Butte quadrangle, Klamath County, Oregon (Map). 1:62,500. United States Geological Survey.
