= Big Butte =

Big Butte may refer to:

- Big Butte Creek, tributary of the Rogue River in Oregon, United States
- Big Butte Springs, natural springs in Jackson County, Oregon, United States
- A fictitious town in Penn Zero: Part-Time Hero

== See also ==
- Big Butt Mountain (disambiguation), multiple summits in North Carolina, United States
- Big Southern Butte, lava domes in Idaho, United States
