= Cascade Canal =

Canal in Oregon, United States

Coordinates: 42°25′04″N 122°14′07″W

The Cascade Canal is a canal located in Klamath and Jackson counties, in the U.S. State of Oregon. It delivers water from Fourmile Lake in the Klamath River watershed over the Cascade Divide to Fish Lake in the Rogue River watershed. It diverts approximately 5,462 acre-feet (6,737,000 m^{3}) annually into Fish Lake. About 33 percent of the water diverted from Fourmile Lake is lost or spilled on the way to Fish Lake.

== History ==
Because of water shortages in the nearby Rogue Valley, the Fish Lake Water Company was established in 1898 to find a way to aid irrigation in the region. The company proposed to enlarge Fish Lake and create Fourmile Lake for added water storage, diverting water from Fourmile Lake to Fish Lake to supplement Little Butte Creek. Fourmile Lake Dam and Fish Lake Dam were constructed in 1906 and 1908, respectively. Construction of the Cascade Canal began in 1910. By 1915, 17,000 feet (5,200 m) of the canal had been constructed. It was completed in the fall of 1915 when the last 7,500 feet (2,300 m) of the canal was built, reaching Fish Lake.

== Course ==
The Cascade Canal begins at Fourmile Lake, located 5,748 feet (1,752 m) above sea level. It travels southeast, around a ridge named Rye Spur (sometimes known as Aye Spur). At the edge of Rye Spur, the canal curves right forming a half-circle of about 0.5 miles (0.80 km) radius, then travels northwest until it meets Ursa Creek. At Ursa Creek, it turns sharply southwest, along Mount McLoughlin's flanks. The canal is crossed by the Pacific Crest Trail and Oregon Route 140 near the Cascade Divide. It crosses the divide directly between Mount McLoughlin and Brown Mountain, before descending to Fish Lake, at an elevation of 4,639 feet (1,414 m). Overall, the canal drops a total of 1,109 feet (338 m). (Note: Total drop calculated by subtracting Fish Lake's elevation from Fourmile Lake's elevation.)
