= Big Butte Creek =

River in Oregon, United States

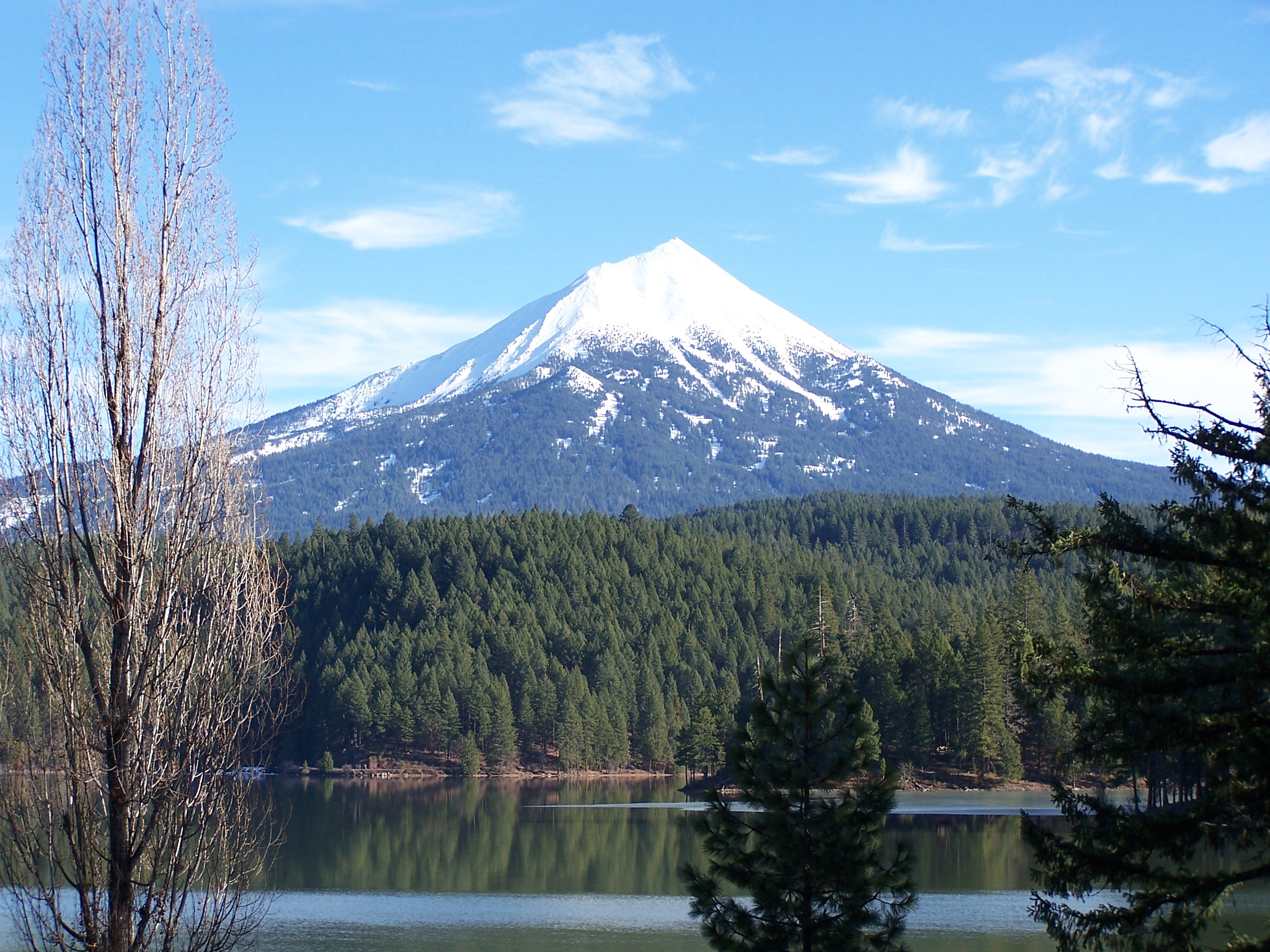
- Willow Lake (located in the Big Butte Creek watershed), with Mount McLoughlin in the background

- Location of the mouth of Big Butte Creek in Oregon
- Etymology: Named after Snowy Butte (Note: A butte (/bjuːt/ BEWT, from French) is an isolated hill with steep sides and a relatively small top.) (now Mount McLoughlin)

Location
- Country: United States
- State: Oregon
- County: Jackson County

Physical characteristics
- Source: Near Butte Falls
  - location: Cascade Range, Jackson County, Oregon
  - coordinates: 42°33′30″N 122°34′38″W (Note: Source elevation and coordinates derived from the GNIS mouth elevations of the North and South forks.)
  - elevation: 2,244 ft (684 m)
- Mouth: Rogue River
  - location: about 1 mile (1.6 km) southwest of Lost Creek Dam, Jackson County, Oregon
  - coordinates: 42°39′29″N 122°41′42″W
  - elevation: 1,562 ft (476 m)
- Length: 12 mi (19 km)
- Basin size: 245 mi^{2} (630 km^{2})
- Discharge
  - location: the mouth
  - average: 244 cu ft/s (6.9 m^{3}/s)
  - minimum: 6.4 cu ft/s (0.18 m^{3}/s)(June 23–24, 1977)
  - maximum: 16,800 cu ft/s (480 m^{3}/s)(December 22, 1964)

Big Butte Creek is a 12-mile-long (19 km) tributary of the Rogue River in the U.S. state of Oregon. It drains approximately 245 square miles (635 km^{2}) of Jackson County. Its two forks, the North Fork and the South Fork, both begin high in the Cascade Range near Mount McLoughlin. Flowing predominantly west, they meet near the city of Butte Falls. The main stem flows generally northwest until it empties into the Rogue River near McLeod, about one mile southwest of William L. Jess Dam and Lost Creek Lake.

Big Butte Creek's watershed was originally settled over 8,000 years ago by humans, and in historical times by the Klamath, Upper Umpqua, and Takelma tribes of Native Americans. In the Rogue River Wars of the 1850s, most of the Native Americans were either killed or forced onto Indian reservations. The first white settlers arrived in the 1860s, naming the creek after Snowy Butte, an early name for Mount McLoughlin. In the late 19th century, the watershed was primarily used for agriculture and logging. The small city of Butte Falls was incorporated in 1911, and remains the only incorporated municipality within the watershed's boundaries.

Big Butte Springs, located in the watershed, provides clean drinking water to more than 115,000 residents of the Rogue Valley. It emits over 26 million US gallons (98,000,000 L) of water per day. Water from Big Butte Creek is also diverted for irrigation at several other locations.

The water quality of the Big Butte Creek watershed is generally high, and it supports several species of trout and salmon. The watershed is also home to more than 152 species of birds, 63 species of mammals, 19 species of reptiles, and numerous plants. The Poverty Flats region was designated an Area of Critical Environmental Concern by the Bureau of Land Management in 1995 to protect several rare species of plants.

== Course ==
Big Butte Creek begins in the Cascade Range near Butte Falls. It flows generally northwest over approximately 12 miles (19 km) to its confluence with the Rogue River. The two main forks of Big Butte Creek, the North Fork and the South Fork, merge at 2,244 feet (684 m) above sea level, while the creek's mouth is located at an elevation of 1,562 feet (476.1 m).

The North Fork's headwaters are located on the slopes of the 6,207-foot-tall (1,892 m) Rustler Peak. It flows southwest, receiving many small tributaries such as Jackass, Eighty Acre, and Friese creeks. Turning west, it flows just north of Butte Falls before merging with the South Fork.

The South Fork begins at the confluence of two of its tributaries, Twincheria and Rancheria creeks. It flows southwest, receiving Fourbit Creek on the left. Fourbit Creek begins near Mount McLoughlin, where massive faults may allow water to seep into it from nearby Fourmile Lake in the Klamath River watershed. The South Fork turns west and receives Willow Creek on the left. Big Butte Springs are located on Willow Creek, and the Medford Aqueduct, which carries drinking water to cities in the Rogue Valley, parallels the South Fork from there all the way to Butte Falls. The South Fork flows over the 15-foot-tall (4.6 m) Butte Falls—the nearby city's namesake—and merges with the North Fork about 1 mile (1.6 km) downstream.

Big Butte Creek travels northwest, gathering McNeil Creek on the left and Clark Creek on the right, along with many other minor tributaries. This region contains many Class II and III rapids, as rated on the International Scale of River Difficulty. The stream is crossed by Cobleigh Road at river mile (RM) 9.5 or river kilometer (RK) 15, and Netherlands Road at RM 3 (RK 4.8). About 0.6 miles (1 km) before its mouth, Big Butte Creek cascades over Crowfoot Falls and is crossed by Crowfoot Road. It then flows into the Rogue River 155 miles (249 km) from its mouth at the Pacific Ocean. Big Butte Creek's mouth is about one mile southwest of William L. Jess Dam, and Oregon Route 62 passes just north of it.

=== Discharge ===
The United States Geological Survey monitors the flow of Big Butte Creek at three different stream gauges: two on the South Fork, and one on the main stem. Both South Fork gauges were shut down in 1991, but the gauge located near the mouth of Big Butte Creek continues to operate. The main stem often discharges less water than the South Fork alone in the summer months because of numerous diversions.

Discharge
Stream	Location	Drainage basin	Years recorded	Average flow	Maximum flow	Minimum flow
South Fork	above Willow Creek	67.6 mi^{2} (175 km^{2})	1986–1991	61.4 cu ft/s (1.74 m^{3}/s)	662 cu ft/s (18.7 m^{3}/s) (February 23, 1986)	21 cu ft/s (0.59 m^{3}/s) (August–September 1988, September 1990)
South Fork	near Butte Falls	138 mi^{2} (357 km^{2})	1911–1991	151 cu ft/s (4.28 m^{3}/s)	12,600 cu ft/s (357 m^{3}/s) (December 22, 1964)	31 cu ft/s (0.88 m^{3}/s) (September 1981)
Main stem	near mouth	245 mi^{2} (635 km^{2})	1945–Present	244 cu ft/s (6.91 m^{3}/s)	16,800 cu ft/s (476 m^{3}/s) (December 22, 1964)	6.4 cu ft/s (0.18 m^{3}/s) (June 23–24, 1977)

== Watershed ==
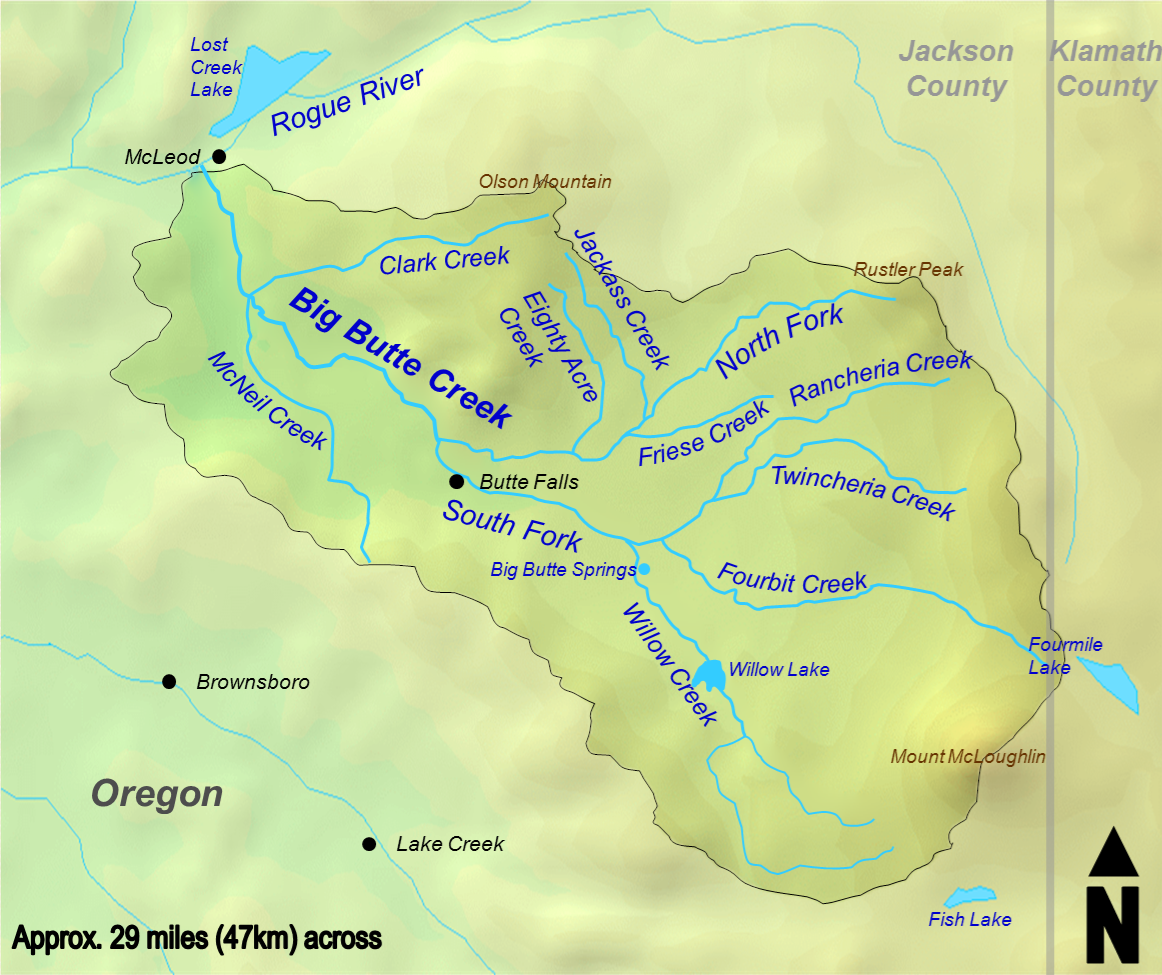
A map of the Big Butte Creek watershed

Big Butte Creek drains approximately 245 square miles (635 km^{2}) of southern Oregon. Elevations range from 1,562 feet (476.1 m) at the creek's mouth to 9,495 feet (2,894 m) at the summit of Mount McLoughlin, with an average of 3,528 feet (1,075 m). About 56 percent is federally owned by the Bureau of Land Management and the United States Forest Service, 44 percent is privately owned, and a small fraction belongs to the City of Medford.

The Big Butte Creek watershed experiences a Mediterranean climate. Temperatures range from 10 °F (−12 °C) in the winter to 100 °F (38 °C) in the summer. Precipitation averages between 35 and 80 inches (890 and 2,000 mm) annually. Most precipitation occurs between November and March. Nine percent of the watershed's surface runoff is collected from rain, 35 percent from rain on snow, and 56 percent from snow. The watershed contains the largest groundwater source in the entire Rogue River basin; one major outlet is at Big Butte Springs.

The watershed is split into two geographic regions: the High Cascades and the Western Cascades, both volcanic in origin. The Western Cascades compose the western two thirds of the watershed. This region is highly eroded, being between 17 and 38 million years old. Its unstable slopes are primarily made of pyroclastic rock. Due to the rock's high ability to absorb moisture, earthflows are common. The High Cascades are much younger, around three to seven million years old. Mount McLoughlin is the most prominent High Cascade volcano in the watershed, last erupting between 20,000 and 15,000 years ago. Basalt and andesite are the most common rock types in this region.

Nearby watersheds include Little Butte Creek to the south, small Klamath River tributaries such as Fourmile Creek to the east, the South Fork Rogue River to the east and north, and minor tributaries of the Rogue River including Reese and Indian creeks to the west.

== Flora and fauna ==
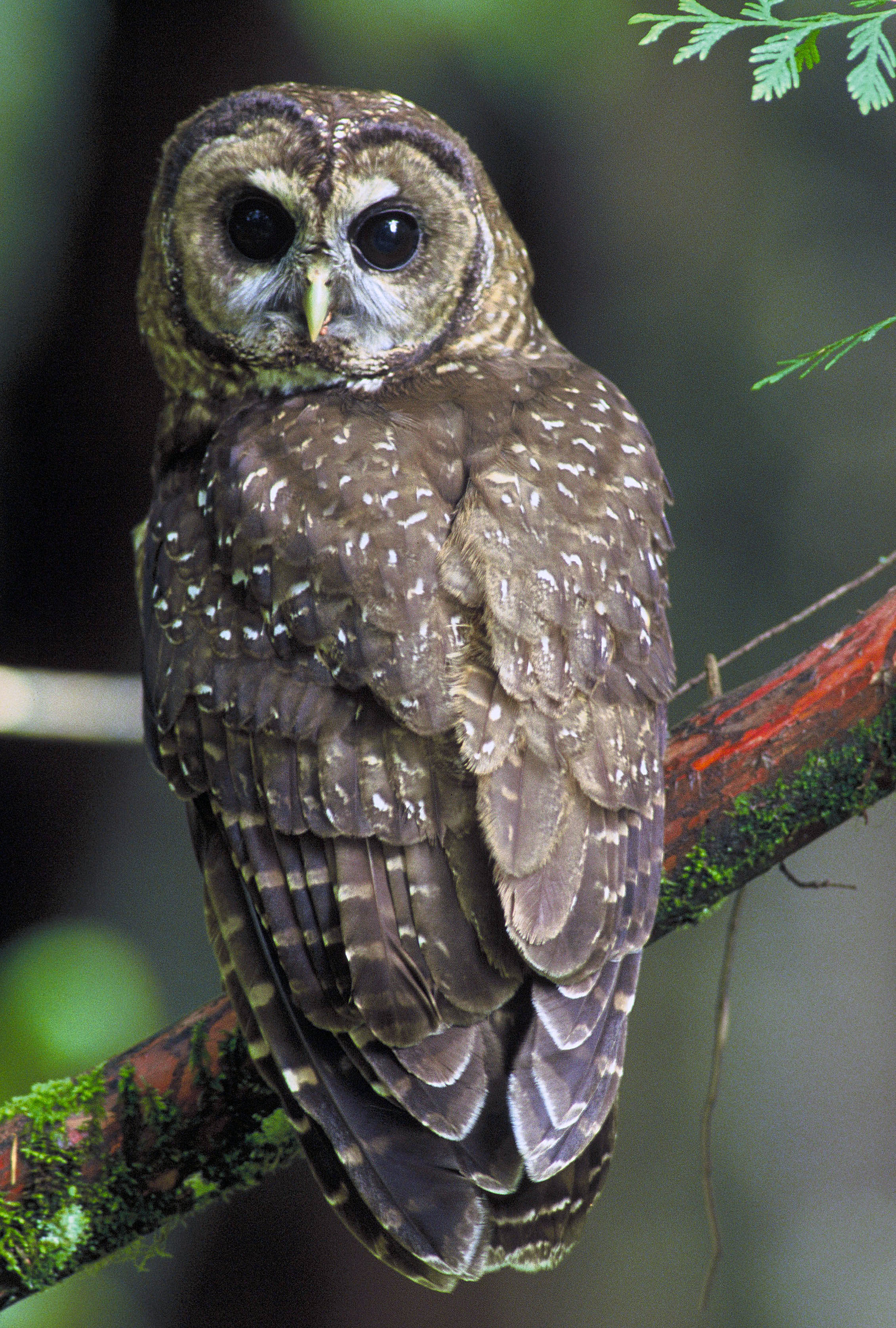
The northern spotted owl, a rare species that inhabits the watershed

Some of the most common trees that grow in the Big Butte Creek watershed include four species of fir, two species of pine, incense cedar, and western hemlock. The understory contains plants such as Pacific yew, Pacific madrone, chinquapin, and vine maple. Several invasive species have been reported in the Big Butte Creek watershed, such as Kentucky bluegrass, common bent, drooping brome, and redtop. The spread of these species is most likely due to overgrazing. Sensitive species that grow in the watershed include Howell's yampah, Egg Lake monkeyflower, clustered lady's slipper, green-flowered ginger, Mount Mazama collomia, and Detling's microseris. Mallow and popcorn flower have also been discovered in riparian zones. The Poverty Flats Area of Critical Environmental Concern (ACEC) is home to several rare species of plants, including Bellinger's meadowfoam, Howell's yampah, and Rocky Mountain woodsia.

Over 152 species of birds are known or suspected to live in the Big Butte Creek watershed, including the northern goshawk and the northern spotted owl, a vulnerable species. Bald eagles nest around Willow Lake. Amphibians such as the vulnerable Oregon spotted frog and the near threatened Cascades frog inhabit some regions of the watershed. Black-tailed deer, Roosevelt elk, cougars, and black bears are the most common of the 63 species of mammals found in the watershed. Fishers and American martens have also been spotted. The gray wolf and the vulnerable grizzly bear once lived in the watershed, but are now considered extirpated. Nineteen species of reptiles live in the area. Other sensitive species include the wolverine, the western pond turtle, the sandhill crane, and Townsend's big-eared bat.

Rainbow trout, chinook and coho salmon, and Pacific Lamprey are the most common anadromous fish that inhabit Big Butte Creek. They travel as far as Butte Falls, sometimes passing over it during high flows. Because of the cold, sterile conditions of the water and the difficulty of jumping over the Butte Creek waterfall, streams above Butte Falls have very low populations of anadromous fish. Native, resident fish in this area include coastal cutthroat and rainbow trout. Willow Lake contains largemouth bass and rainbow, cutthroat, and brook trout. Overall, the number of fish in the Big Butte Creek watershed has declined in recent years, possibly due to the clearing of riparian zones and rising water temperatures.

== History ==
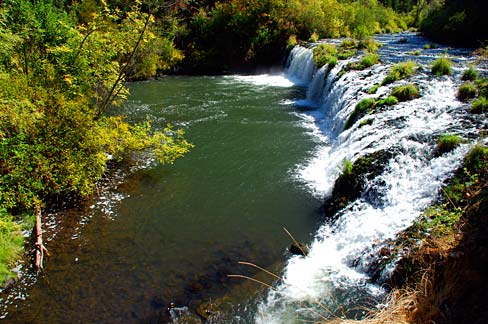
Butte Falls, located on the South Fork of Big Butte Creek

Humans have lived in the Big Butte Creek area for at least 8,000 years. The Klamath, Upper Umpqua, Takelma, and Latgawa tribes of Native Americans inhabited the watershed until they were driven out in the Rogue River Wars of the 1850s. On Christmas Eve, December 24, 1855, Captain E. A. Rice along with 34 other men attacked a Native American encampment near the creek's mouth. Eighteen Native American men were killed, all the women and children were captured, and the camp was burned to the ground. Most were relocated to Indian reservations. Non-indigenous settlers first arrived in the early 1860s, and agriculture, ranching, and logging industries quickly developed. Big Butte Creek was named by early settlers for its close proximity to Mount McLoughlin (also known as Snowy Butte), as was nearby Little Butte Creek.

In 1904, a water-powered sawmill was constructed at Butte Falls. The town of Butte Falls was established in 1906, and incorporated in 1911. The Pacific and Eastern Railway was constructed to Butte Falls in 1910. Butte Falls also received water rights to Ginger Springs, providing high quality drinking water for the town.

The Cat Hill Burn destroyed 30,000 acres (120 km^{2}) of forest on Rustler Peak in 1910. In 1915, the Eagle Point Irrigation Canal was constructed, diverting approximately 100 cubic feet per second (2.83 m^{3}/s) of water for irrigation in the Little Butte Creek watershed. The canal begins just below Butte Falls. The Butte Falls Fish Hatchery was also constructed in 1915. Originally, the hatchery impounded water from Ginger Creek, however in 1923 a canal was built transferring 15.5 cubic feet per second (0.439 m^{3}/s) of water from the South Fork of Big Butte Creek. The Medford Aqueduct, a 31-inch-wide (79 cm) pipeline, was constructed in 1927. It delivers about 40 cubic feet per second (1.1 m^{3}/s) of drinking water from Big Butte Springs south to the Bear Creek watershed. In 1951, a second pipeline was added, and Willow Dam was constructed, creating Willow Lake. The springs serve over 115,000 customers throughout the Rogue Valley.

Loggers felled massive amounts of forest in the 1920s and 1930s. Reforestation efforts began in the 1940s because natural regeneration could not keep pace with the rate of logging. In 1962, the Columbus Day Storm knocked many more large trees to the ground. Today, old-growth forest covers only about five percent of the watershed.

In 1995, the Poverty Flats region was designated an Area of Critical Environmental Concern (ACEC) by the Bureau of Land Management. Located about 3.5 miles (5.6 km) west of Butte Falls, the ACEC is home to several rare species of plants. It was fenced off in 1996 to protect the area from roaming cattle.

The Butte Falls Fish Hatchery was scheduled to be closed by the Oregon Department of Fish and Wildlife in July 2009 as part of a statewide effort to decrease the department's budget, but on July 3 it was announced that the hatchery would continue to operate with only one employee. However, the hatchery was closed permanently in October 2010.

A 160-foot (49 m) portion of the Eagle Point Irrigation Canal failed on October 2, 2011, sending 86 cubic feet per second (2.4 m^{3}/s) of muddy water down a hillside, across a road, and into lower Big Butte Creek, a vital salmon spawning area. A stream gauge on the Rogue River about 15 miles (24 km) downstream reported turbidity levels twenty times higher than before the breach. The canal was repaired by October 28.

== Pollution ==
The Oregon Department of Environmental Quality (DEQ) has monitored Big Butte Creek for eight different parameters that affect water quality: temperature, oxygen saturation, pH, nutrients, bacteria, chemical contaminants such as pesticides and metals, turbidity, and alkalinity. Streams that exceed the standard level are placed on the DEQ 303d list in accordance with the Clean Water Act. About 54.2 miles (87.2 km) of the streams in the Big Butte Creek watershed were listed on the 2004/2006 DEQ 303d list. The entire main stem exceeded the standard level for temperature, oxygen saturation, and E. coli, a type of bacteria. The lower 13.9 miles (22.4 km) of the North Fork were listed for high temperature, along with many other minor tributaries. The South Fork was not listed, although some of its tributaries were.

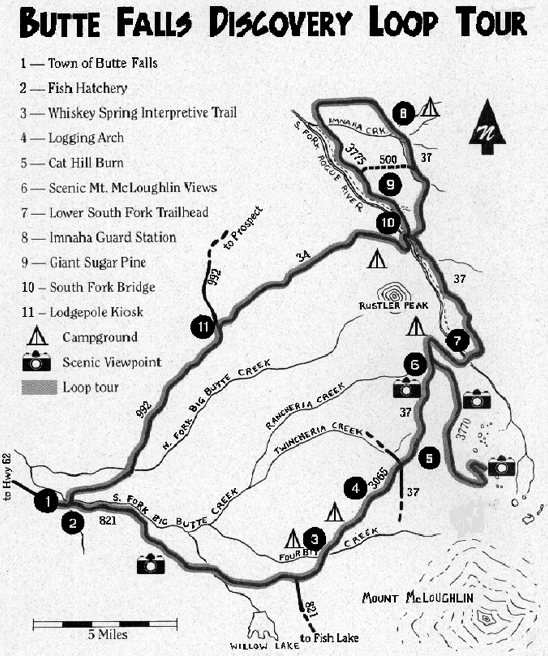
A map of the Butte Falls Discovery Loop Tour, which passes through scenic areas of the Rogue River – Siskiyou National Forest

Overall, water quality in the Big Butte Creek watershed is generally high, however road construction and logging can cause severe erosion, leading to high levels of sedimentation and turbidity. The Willow Creek region often experiences high turbidity, but Willow Lake traps the sediment before it can travel downstream. Big Butte Springs provides clean water that requires minimal treatment to meet water quality standards. Water from the springs has very little chemical pollution, low turbidity, and temperatures averaging between 44 and 46 °F (6.7 and 7.8 °C).

== Recreation ==
Popular recreational activities in the Big Butte Creek watershed include hunting, camping, hiking, and horseback riding. Many tourists also come to sight-see. The most heavily used trail in the area is the Blue Canyon Trail, leading to the Sky Lakes Wilderness, and ultimately the larger Pacific Crest Trail. The city of Butte Falls has organized the Butte Falls Discovery Loop Tour, a half-day-long drive through the Rogue River – Siskiyou National Forest. The loop starts in Butte Falls, and has several stops for hiking and viewing the landscape, including Mount McLoughlin.

Water recreation on Willow Lake includes boating, swimming, fishing, and waterskiing. Fishing is also popular in other streams, especially Fourbit Creek. Cross-country skiing and snowmobiling are popular in the winter.

== See also ==
- List of rivers of Oregon

== Notes and references ==
Notes

== Bibliography ==
Books

- Fagan, David (1885). History of Benton County. Oregon: D. D. Fagan. OCLC 5249765.
- Fletcher, Angie; Davis, Susan; Pyke, Grant; Reinhart, Jill; Scanlon, Karen (2005). Water utility/agricultural alliances. Denver, Colorado: American Water Works Association. ISBN 978-1-58321-375-9. OCLC 61513241.
- Giordano, Pete; Willamette Kayak and Canoe Club (2004) [First published 1980]. Soggy Sneakers: A Paddler's Guide to Oregon Rivers (4th ed.). Seattle, Washington: The Mountaineers Books. ISBN 978-0-89886-815-9. OCLC 53793536.
- McArthur, Lewis A.; McArthur, Lewis L. (2003) [1928]. Oregon Geographic Names (7th ed.). Portland, Oregon: Oregon Historical Society Press. ISBN 978-0875952772.

News articles

- Freeman, Mark (October 27, 2010). "95 years down the drain". Mail Tribune. Medford, Oregon. Archived from the original on November 8, 2010.
- Freeman, Mark (July 3, 2009). "Butte Falls Hatchery gets reprieve". Mail Tribune. Medford, Oregon. Archived from the original on June 10, 2011.
- Freeman, Mark (April 27, 2009). "Butte Falls Hatchery to close". Mail Tribune. Medford, Oregon. Archived from the original on June 10, 2011.
- Freeman, Mark (October 28, 2011). "Repairs complete at canal; upgrade to follow". Mail Tribune. Medford, Oregon. Archived from the original on November 1, 2013.
- Freeman, Mark (October 4, 2011). "Spill muddies Big Butte Creek". Mail Tribune. Medford, Oregon. Archived from the original on October 11, 2011.
- Heie, Troy (June 23, 2008). "Bottled vs. tap water". Mail Tribune. Medford, Oregon. Archived from the original on June 10, 2011.

Websites

- "Recreation – Butte Falls Discovery Loop Tour". Rogue River – Siskiyou National Forest. Archived from the original on January 18, 2010.
- "Sky Lakes Wilderness". Rogue River – Siskiyou National Forest.
- "USGS 14335200 So Fk Big Butte Cr Ab Willow Cr Nr B Fls, Oreg.: USGS Surface-Water Annual Statistics". United States Geological Survey.
- "USGS 14335200 So Fk Big Butte Cr Ab Willow Cr Nr B Fls, Oreg.: Peak Streamflow". United States Geological Survey.
- "USGS 14335200 So Fk Big Butte Cr Ab Willow Cr Nr B Fls, Oreg.: Annual Water Data Reports". United States Geological Survey.
- "USGS 14335500 South Fork Big Butte Cr Nr Butte Falls, Oreg.: USGS Surface-Water Annual Statistics". United States Geological Survey.
- "USGS 14335500 South Fork Big Butte Cr Nr Butte Falls, Oreg.: Peak Streamflow". United States Geological Survey.
- "USGS 14335500 South Fork Big Butte Cr Nr Butte Falls, Oreg.: Annual Water Data Reports". United States Geological Survey.

Other

- Oregon Road and Recreation Atlas (Map) (4th ed.). 1:225,000. Medford, Oregon: Benchmark Maps. 2010. ISBN 978-0-929591-62-9. OCLC 466904230.
- "Big Butte Creek". Geographic Names Information System. United States Geological Survey, United States Department of the Interior. November 28, 1980.
- "Butte Falls Hatchery Operations Plan" (PDF). Oregon State Library. 2010.
- "Central Big Butte Creek Watershed Analysis" (PDF). Bureau of Land Management. Archived from the original (PDF) on February 24, 2017.
- "Evaluation of spring Chinook salmon spawning in Big Butte Creek, 2008" (PDF). Oregon Department of Fish and Wildlife. March 2009.
- "Lower Big Butte Watershed Analysis" (PDF). Bureau of Land Management. September 1999. Archived from the original (PDF) on February 27, 2017.
- "North Fork Big Butte Creek". Geographic Names Information System. United States Geological Survey. November 28, 1980.
- "Rustler Peak". Geographic Names Information System. United States Geological Survey. November 28, 1980.
- "South Fork Big Butte Creek". Geographic Names Information System. United States Geological Survey. November 28, 1980.
- United States Geological Survey (February 6, 2010). Butte Falls quadrangle, Butte Falls (Topographic map). Reston, VA: United States Geological Survey – via TopoQuest.
- United States Geological Survey (March 6, 2010). Butte Falls quadrangle, Cobleigh Road (Topographic map). Reston, VA: United States Geological Survey – via TopoQuest.
- United States Geological Survey (March 6, 2010). McLeod quadrangle, Netherlands Road (Topographic map). Reston, VA: United States Geological Survey – via TopoQuest.
- United States Geological Survey (February 6, 2010). McLeod quadrangle, McLeod (Topographic map). Reston, VA: United States Geological Survey – via TopoQuest.
- "Upper Big Butte Watershed Analysis" (PDF). Rogue River National Forest. December 1995.
- "Upper Rogue Watershed Assessment" (PDF). Upper Rogue Watershed Association. December 16, 2006. Archived from the original (PDF) on July 20, 2011.
- "USGS 14337500 Big Butte Creek Near McLeod, OR" (PDF). United States Geological Survey. 2012.
- "Water for Our Community". Southern Oregon University. March 2002. Archived from the original (WMV) on July 24, 2011.
- "Water Quality Restoration Plan" (PDF). Bureau of Land Management. January 2008. Archived from the original (PDF) on July 20, 2017.
