= Fish Lake (Jackson County, Oregon) =

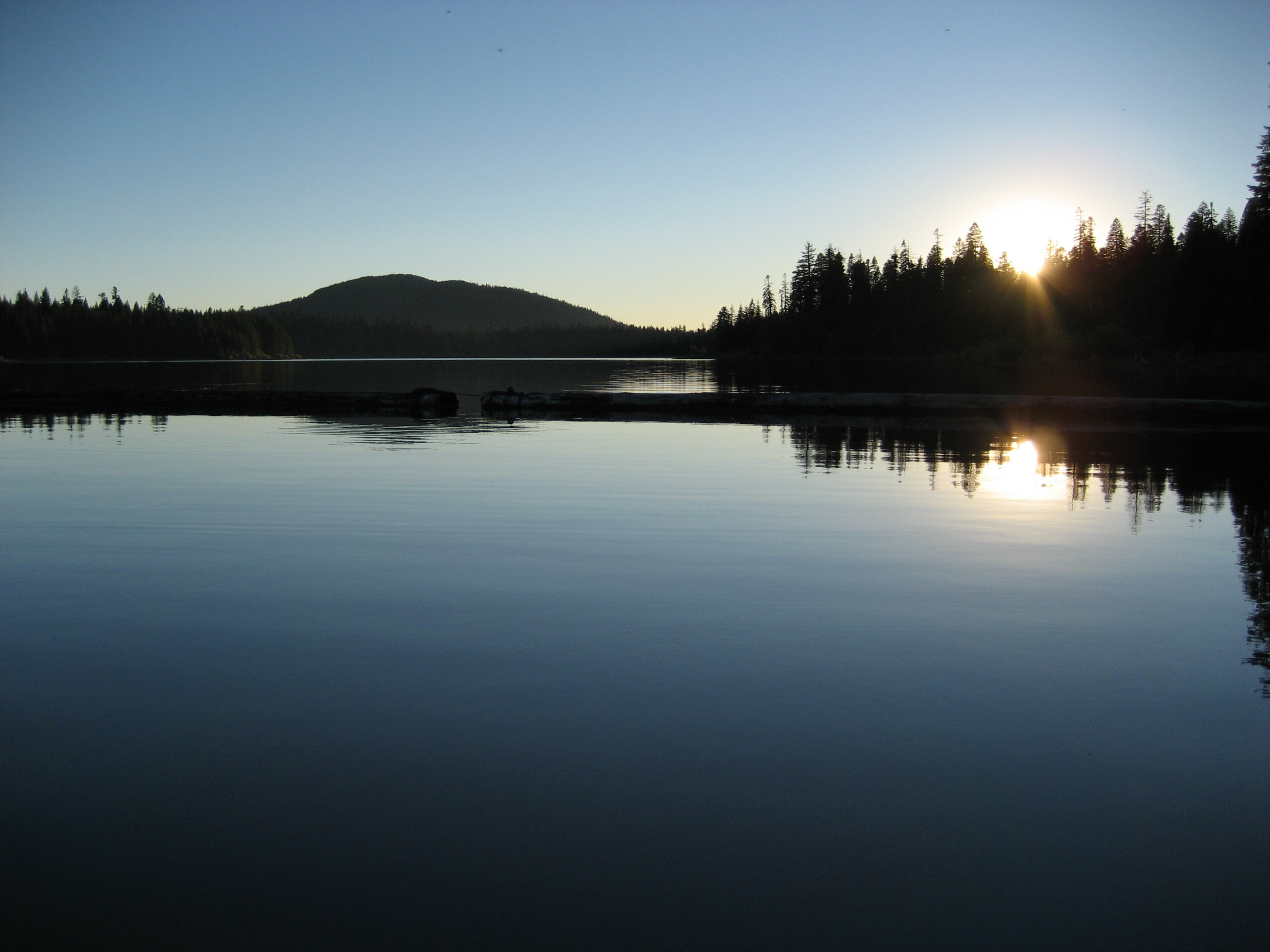
- Sunset on Fish Lake

- Location within Oregon Location within the United States
- Location: Jackson County, Oregon
- Coordinates: 42°22′39″N 122°20′51″W
- Type: Reservoir
- Primary inflows: Little Butte Creek watershed
- Primary outflows: North Fork Little Butte Creek
- Catchment area: 20 square miles (52 km^{2})
- Basin countries: United States
- Surface area: 483 acres (1,950,000 m^{2})
- Average depth: 18 feet (5.5 m)
- Max. depth: 31 feet (9.4 m)
- Water volume: 7,836 acre-feet (9,666,000 m^{3})
- Surface elevation: 4,639 feet (1,414 m)

Fish Lake is a reservoir located 4,639 feet (1,414 m) above sea level in Jackson County, Oregon, United States. It is 35 miles (56 km) northeast of Medford. Originally a natural lake, it was enlarged by the 50-foot (15 m) tall Fish Lake Dam, which impounds the north fork of Little Butte Creek, in the Rogue River watershed.

== Geology ==
Fish Lake is located between two volcanoes: Mount McLoughlin to the north and Brown Mountain to the south. Two-thousand-year-old andesite lava flows erupted from Brown Mountain surround Fish Lake's southern shore.

== History ==
Fish Lake was originally a small natural lake. In 1898, the Fish Lake Water Company was established to help irrigate the Rogue Valley. The company proposed to enlarge Fish Lake and nearby Fourmile Lake for added water storage. The temporary Fish Lake Dam was constructed between 1902 and 1908. In 1906, Fourmile Lake Dam was constructed. The two lakes were connected in 1915 by the Cascade Canal, bringing water from Fourmile Lake in the Klamath River watershed over the Cascade Divide to Fish Lake, to supplement Little Butte Creek. The temporary dam was later replaced by a permanent earthfill dam. The dam was modified again in 1922. In 1955, a new spillway was constructed. An auxiliary spillway was added in 1996. The lake is now about three times its original size.

== Statistics ==
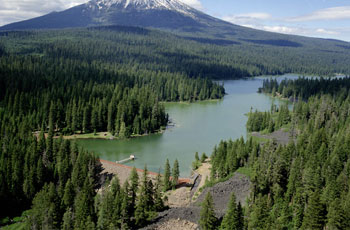
Fish Lake with Mount McLoughlin's lower slopes in the background

Fish Lake has an average surface area of 483 acres (1,950,000 m^{2}), an average volume of 7,836 acre-feet (9,666,000 m^{3}), and a 20-square-mile (52 km^{2}) drainage basin. It has an average depth of 18 feet (5.5 m), and a maximum depth of 31 feet (9.4 m). Fish Lake Dam stands 50 feet (15 m) tall and 960 feet (290 m) long.

== Climate ==
Climate data for Fish Lake
Month	Jan	Feb	Mar	Apr	May	Jun	Jul	Aug	Sep	Oct	Nov	Dec	Year
Record high °F (°C)	64 (18)	70 (21)	74 (23)	82 (28)	88 (31)	98 (37)	98 (37)	100 (38)	104 (40)	98 (37)	85 (29)	65 (18)	104 (40)
Mean daily maximum °F (°C)	40.1 (4.5)	42.8 (6.0)	47.0 (8.3)	51.4 (10.8)	59.3 (15.2)	67.1 (19.5)	78.1 (25.6)	77.5 (25.3)	71.5 (21.9)	58.0 (14.4)	44.4 (6.9)	38.0 (3.3)	56.3 (13.5)
Mean daily minimum °F (°C)	23.7 (−4.6)	24.2 (−4.3)	26.6 (−3.0)	29.7 (−1.3)	34.9 (1.6)	41.9 (5.5)	47.5 (8.6)	46.8 (8.2)	42.3 (5.7)	35.2 (1.8)	29.0 (−1.7)	24.4 (−4.2)	33.9 (1.0)
Record low °F (°C)	−15 (−26)	−13 (−25)	−5 (−21)	0 (−18)	19 (−7)	21 (−6)	24 (−4)	28 (−2)	22 (−6)	17 (−8)	−2 (−19)	−10 (−23)	−15 (−26)
Average precipitation inches (mm)	6.12 (155)	4.46 (113)	5.27 (134)	4.95 (126)	3.67 (93)	1.72 (44)	0.46 (12)	0.52 (13)	1.32 (34)	3.22 (82)	6.04 (153)	7.45 (189)	45.2 (1,148)
Average extreme snow depth inches (cm)	30 (76)	37 (94)	37 (94)	26 (66)	7 (18)	0 (0)	0 (0)	0 (0)	0 (0)	1 (2.5)	9 (23)	23 (58)	37 (94)
Average precipitation days (≥ 0.01 in)	15.4	12.9	14.7	14.7	9.7	5.5	2.0	2.2	3.9	8.5	15.1	17.0	121.6
Source: NOAA,

== Fauna ==
Rainbow trout and brook trout are common in the lake. Osprey and eagles have been spotted in the area.

== Recreation ==
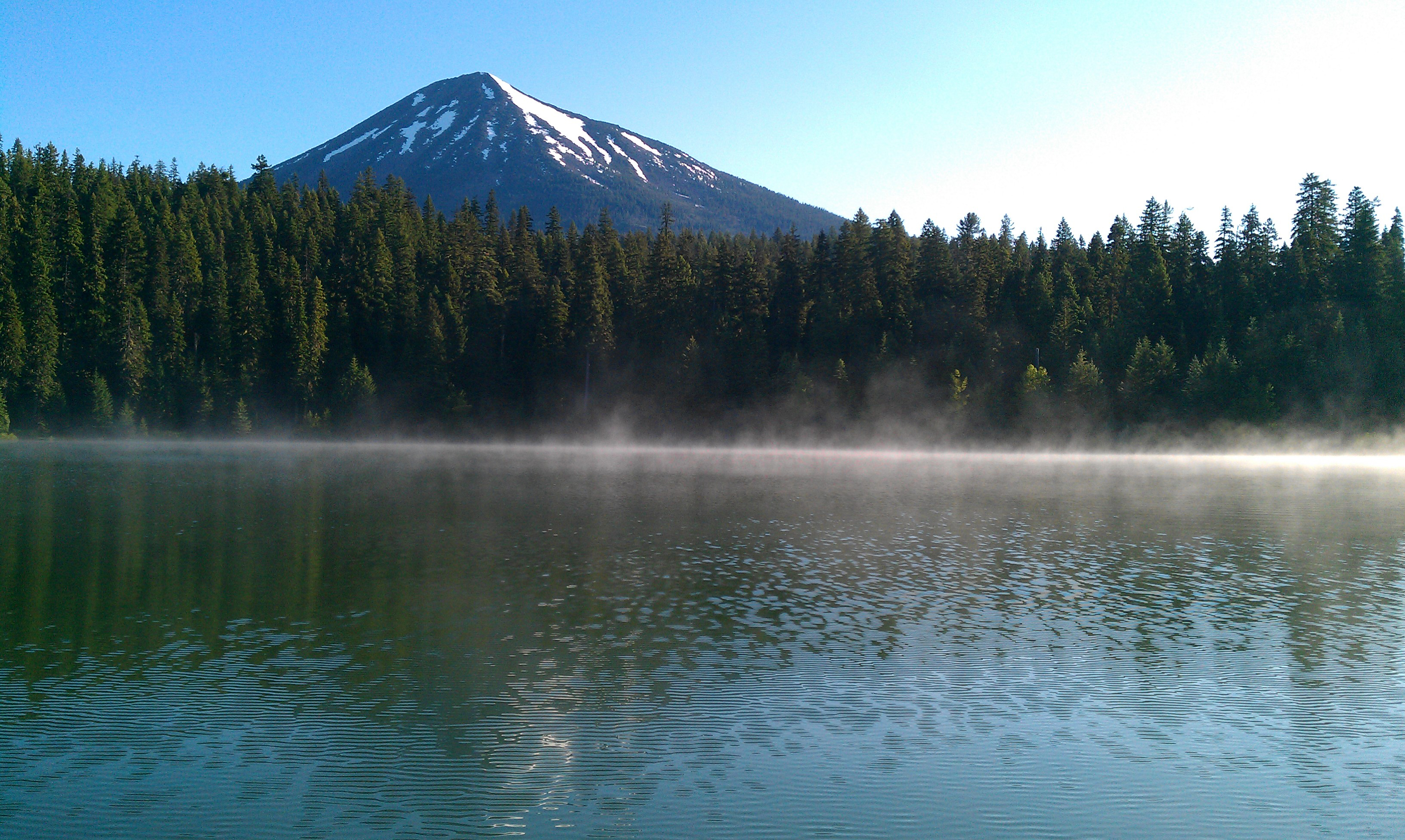
Fish Lake near Highway 140

The Pacific Crest Trail passes by Fish Lake's eastern shore. Three campgrounds are located around the lake. Popular activities include fishing, swimming, and boating.

== See also ==
- List of lakes in Oregon
