= McLeod, Oregon =

Unincorporated community in the state of Oregon, United States

- Unincorporated community
- Location within Oregon Location within the United States
- Coordinates: 42.662°N 122.688°W
- Country: United States
- State: Oregon
- County: Jackson
- Elevation: 1,552 ft (473 m)
- Time zone: UTC-8 (Pacific (PST))
  - Summer (DST): UTC-7 (PDT)
- ZIP code: 97541
- Area codes: 458 and 541
- GNIS feature ID: 1146017
- Coordinates and elevation from Geographic Names Information System

McLeod is an unincorporated community in Jackson County, Oregon, United States. It lies at the confluence of Big Butte Creek with the Rogue River just downstream of Lost Creek Lake. It is along Oregon Route 62 between Shady Cove and Prospect. The community was named after its 1910 settler William R. McLeod.
