= Rustler Peak =

Summit and shield volcano in Oregon, US

Coordinates: 42°37′09″N 122°20′53″W

Highest point
- Elevation: 6,214 ft (1,894 m)

Geography
- Location: Jackson County, Oregon

Geology
- Rock age(s): Pliocene, Pleistocene
- Mountain type(s): Shield volcano, stratovolcano
- Volcanic arc: Cascade Volcanic Arc
- Last eruption: Pleistocene

Rustler Peak is a summit and volcano in the U.S. state of Oregon. The elevation is 6,214 feet (1,894 m).

Rustler Peak was named for the fact cattle rustlers once operated in the area.

== Geology ==
Rustler Peak is considered a shield volcano, as well as a stratovolcano. It is an extinct volcano.
