= Big Butt Mountain =

Name of five mountains in North Carolina

Coordinates: 35°35′51″N 82°47′56″W

Big Butt Mountain or Big Butt are the names of five distinct mountains in Western North Carolina. Butt in this context is a corruption of butte.

== Buncombe County ==
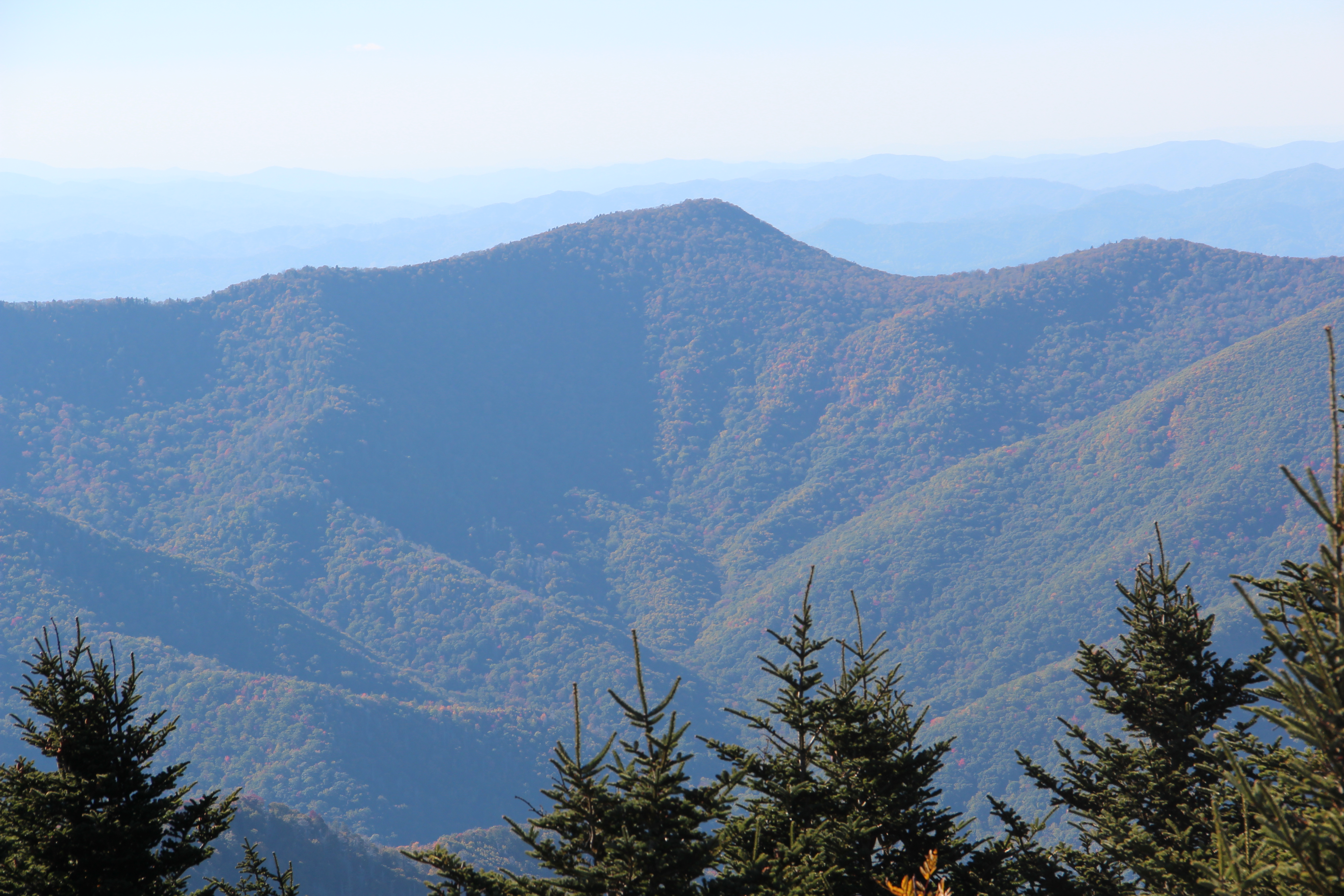
Big Butt (Buncombe and Yancey counties), viewed from Mount Mitchell

- Big Butt Mountain is a summit in Buncombe and Haywood counties. It has an elevation of 4,767 feet (1,453 m).
- Big Butt is a summit in Buncombe and Yancey counties. It has an elevation of 5,948 feet (1,813 m).

== Haywood County ==
- Big Butt is a summit inside the Great Smoky Mountains National Park in Haywood County, North Carolina. The mountain has an elevation of about 6,024 feet (1,836 m).

== Macon County ==
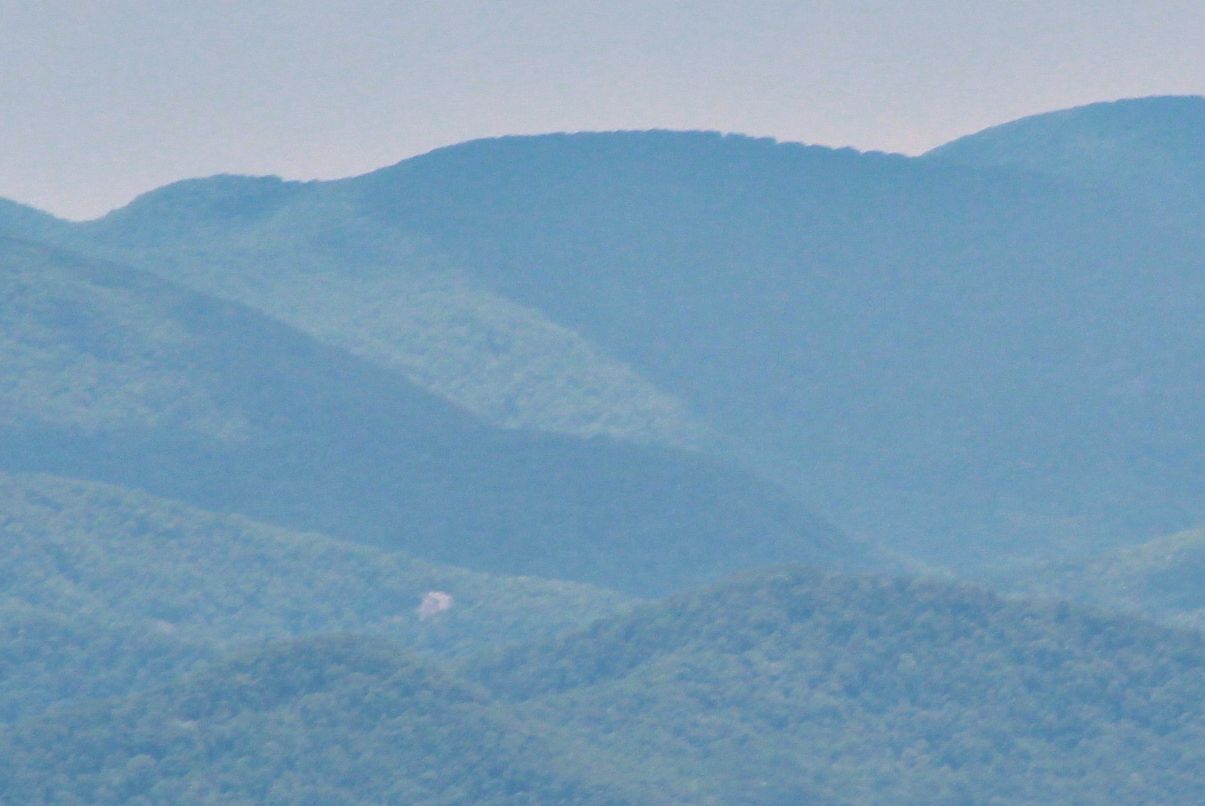
Big Butt, Macon County viewed from Rabun Bald

- Big Butt is a summit in Macon County. The mountain has an elevation of about 5,000 feet (1,500 m).

== Madison County ==
- Big Butt is a summit on the border of North Carolina and Greene County, Tennessee. The mountain has an elevation of 4,806 feet (1,465 m).
