= Fourmile Lake (Oregon) =

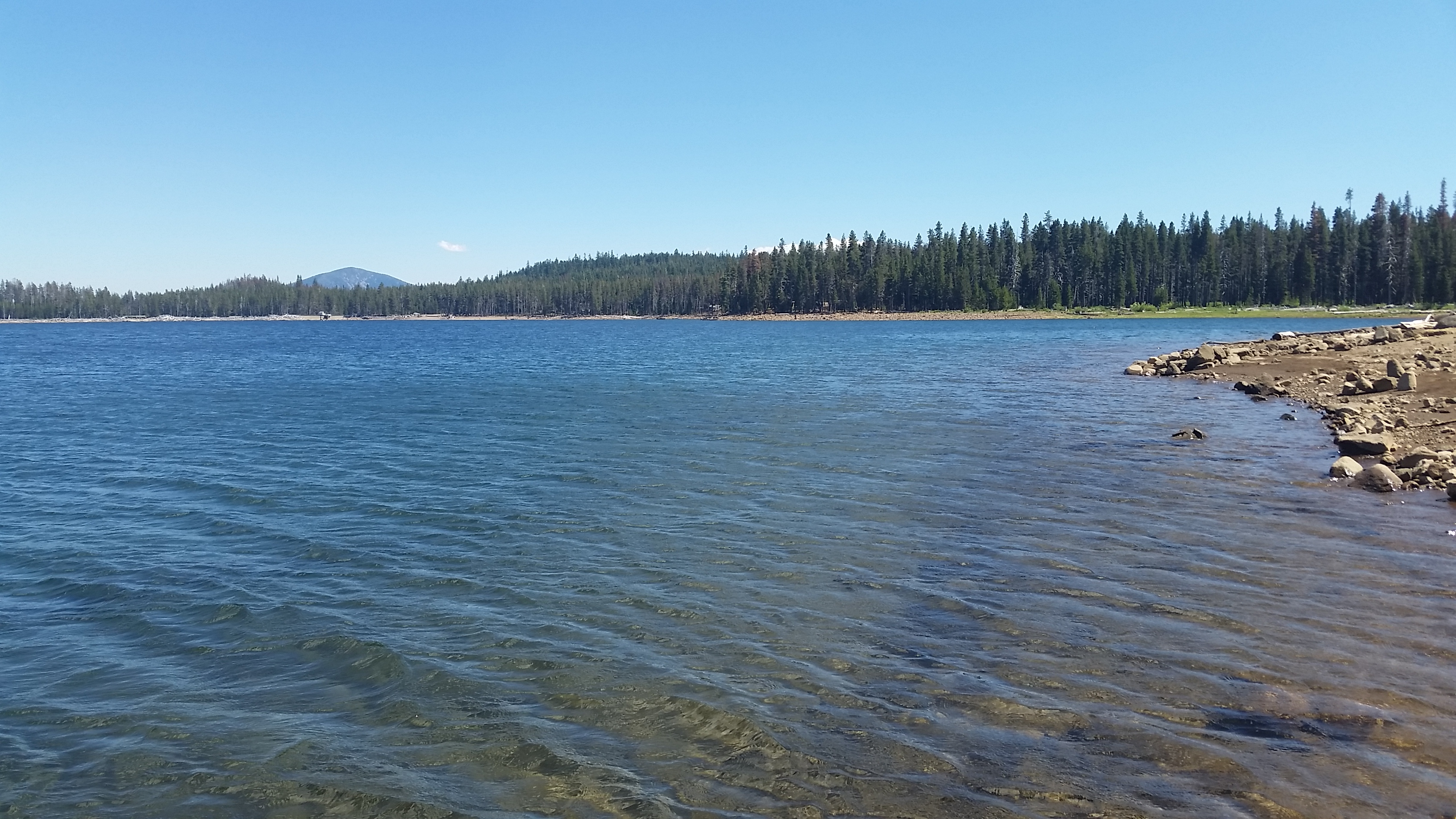
- Fourmile Lake, Southwest shore

- Location within Oregon Location within the United States
- Location: Klamath County, Oregon
- Coordinates: 42°27′57″N 122°15′14″W
- Type: Reservoir
- Primary inflows: Fourmile Creek
- Primary outflows: Fourmile Creek
- Catchment area: 105 square miles (270 km^{2})
- Basin countries: United States
- Surface area: 740 acres (3,000,000 m^{2})
- Max. depth: 170 feet (52 m)
- Water volume: 15,600 acre-feet (19,200,000 m^{3})
- Surface elevation: 5,748 feet (1,752 m)

Fourmile Lake (or Four Mile Lake) is a reservoir located 5,748 feet (1,752 m) above sea level in Klamath County, Oregon, United States. It is 45 miles (72 km) northeast of Medford. The lake was created when the 25-foot-tall (7.6 m) Fourmile Lake Dam was constructed, impounding Fourmile Creek, in the Klamath River watershed. It is located just to the east of Mount McLoughlin, which stands 9,495 feet (2,894 m) above sea level. The lake is bordered by Sky Lakes Wilderness, and is in the Winema National Forest.

== History ==
In 1898, the Fish Lake Water Company was established to help irrigate the Rogue Valley. The company proposed create Fourmile Lake and enlarge nearby Fish Lake for added water storage. The Fourmile Lake Dam was constructed in 1906, while Fish Lake was completed in 1908. The two lakes were connected in 1915 by the Cascade Canal, taking water from Fourmile Lake over the Cascade Divide to Fish Lake, supplementing Little Butte Creek. In 1955, the dam was repaired, and a new spillway was added.

== Statistics ==
Fourmile Lake has an average surface area of 740 acres (3,000,000 m^{2}), an average volume of 15,600 acre-feet (19,200,000 m^{3}), and a 105-square-mile (270 km^{2}) drainage basin. It has a maximum depth of 170 feet (52 m). Fourmile Lake Dam stands 25 feet (7.6 m) tall and 660 feet (200 m) long.

== Fauna ==
Rainbow Trout, Kokanee, Brook Trout, and Lake trout are common in the lake. The Bushy-tailed Woodrat and Golden-mantled Ground Squirrel, species of least concern, can be found around the lake.

== Recreation ==
The Pacific Crest Trail passes by about 2 miles (3.2 km) from Fourmile Lake. The lake is included in the Winema National Forest. The Sky Lakes Wilderness borders the lake, and a trail leads into it. One campground is located near the lake. Popular activities include fishing, swimming, and boating.

== See also ==
- List of lakes in Oregon
