= Mount McLoughlin =

Stratovolcano in Oregon

- Alwilamchaldis, Mayakax, Kesh yainatat
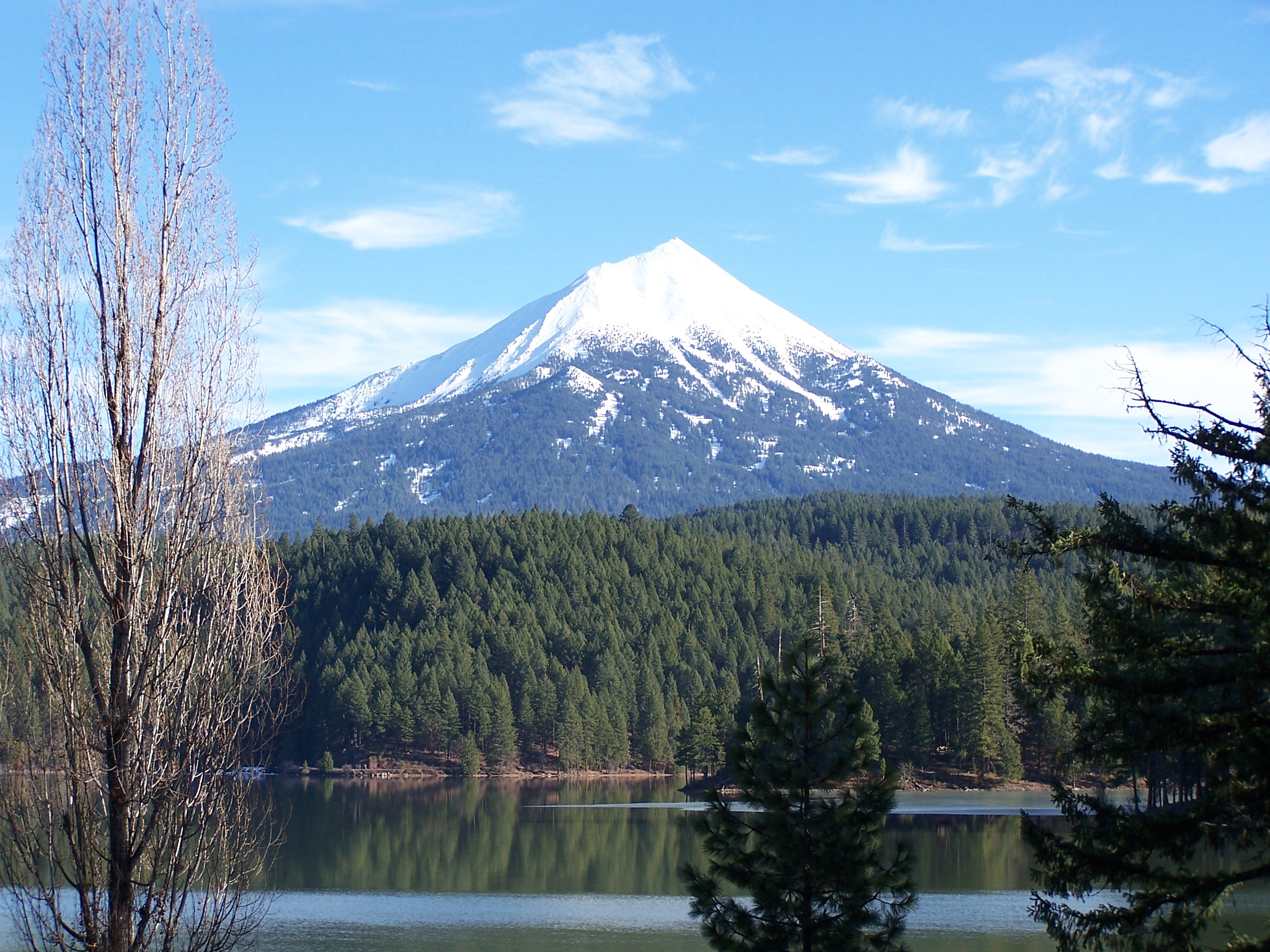
- Mount McLoughlin from across Willow Lake

Highest point
- Elevation: 9,493 ft (2,893 m) NAVD 88
- Prominence: 4,475 ft (1,364 m)
- Listing: Oregon county high points; North America isolated peaks 207th; U.S. most prominent peaks 165th
- Coordinates: 42°26′40″N 122°18′56″W

Geography
- Location: Jackson County, Oregon, U.S.
- Parent range: Cascade Range
- Topo map: USGS Mount McLoughlin

Geology
- Rock age: Less than 700,000 years
- Mountain type: Stratovolcano
- Volcanic arc: Cascade Volcanic Arc
- Last eruption: About 30,000 years ago

Climbing
- Easiest route: Trail hike

Mount McLoughlin is a 9,493 ft (2,893 m) dormant steep-sided stratovolcano, or composite volcano, in the Cascade Range of southern Oregon, United States. Located in the Sky Lakes Wilderness, it is one of the volcanic peaks in the Cascade Volcanic Arc, within the High Cascades sector. A prominent landmark for the Rogue River Valley, the mountain is north of Mount Shasta, and south-southwest of Crater Lake. It was named around 1838 after John McLoughlin, a Chief Factor for the Hudson's Bay Company. Mount McLoughlin's prominence has made it a landmark to Native Americans and others for thousands of years.

McLoughlin consists largely of basaltic andesite. It underwent three major eruptive periods before its last activity took place between 30,000 and 20,000 years ago. It is not currently monitored for activity or deformation. Diverse species of flora and fauna inhabit the area, which is subject to frequent snowfall and temperature variation between seasons. The Pacific Crest Trail skirts the eastern and northern sides and also accesses the only trail to the summit, the 6-mile (9.7 km) McLoughlin Trail 3716. The mountain can also be skied.

== Geography ==
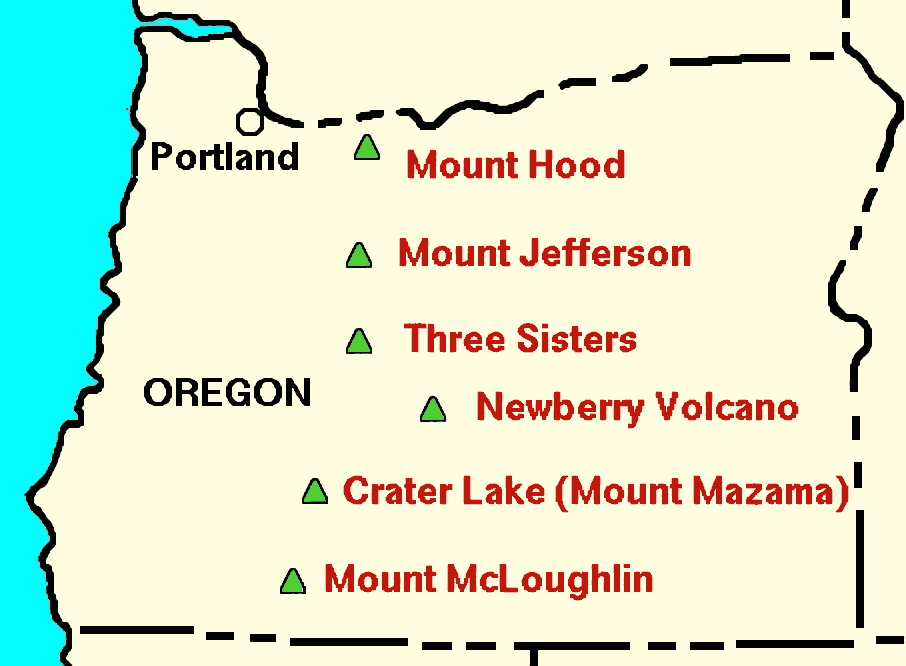
Location in Oregon relative to other major volcanoes

The major landmark for the Rogue River Valley, Mount McLoughlin reaches an elevation of 9,493 ft (2,893 m).^{[a]} The tallest volcano in between Mount Shasta — located 70 mi (110 km) to the south — and South Sister 120 miles (190 km) to the north, it lies in the Cascade Range, in the southern portion of the U.S. state of Oregon. Most of the volcano lies in Jackson County, though the eastern side of its base lies in Klamath County. It is the sixth tallest peak in Oregon, but despite its height, Mount McLoughlin only has a volume of 3 cu mi (13 km^{3}).

The volcano includes the Wilámxa Tip and Máalsi Tip peaks, which occur on its flanks at elevations of 7,179 ft (2,188 m) and 7,638 feet (2,328 m), respectively. It can be seen from the Interstate 5 and U.S. Route 97 highways. From the southwest and southeast, it has a symmetrical appearance, but the northeastern flank of the volcano has been eroded and transformed into a hollow amphitheater.

=== Wilderness ===
McLoughlin lies within the Sky Lakes Wilderness area, part of the Rogue River–Siskiyou and the Fremont–Winema National Forests. The Sky Lakes Wilderness covers an area of 113,590 acres (459.7 km^{2}), with a width of 6 mi (9.7 km) and a length of 27 mi (43 km). Designated by the U.S. Congress in 1984, it stretches from Crater Lake National Park to Oregon Route 140 at the south and ranges in elevation from 3,800 ft (1,200 m) in the Middle Fork canyon of the Rogue River to the peak of McLoughlin. The wilderness area encompasses more than 200 bodies of water including ponds and lakes, in addition to forests and mountain ridges.

=== Physical geography ===
The local area has warm, dry summers during the daytime with cool nights, and snowy winters that impede access to the Sky Lakes Wilderness through July. Moisture is limited between June and October barring occasional thunderstorms, which accounts for a very short growing season between ice thawing and drought. On average, precipitation does not exceed 40 in (100 cm) at medium elevations, reaching 80 to 90 in (200 to 230 cm) at greater heights, most of which consists of snowfall.

A number of lakes lie around the base of the mountain, including the Lake of the Woods and Fourmile Lake. The Upper Klamath Lake, the largest body of freshwater in the state, sits to the east of Mount McLoughlin. The Summit Lake is a small lake on the northern slope of the volcano between the Rogue River and the Klamath Basin. The Big Butte Creek, a tributary of the Rogue River, drains the northwestern part of McLoughlin, while the Little Butte Creek is fed by the southern flanks.

=== Climate ===
Climate data for Mount McLoughlin 42.4442 N, 122.3168 W, Elevation: 8,816 ft (2,687 m) (1991–2020 normals)
Month	Jan	Feb	Mar	Apr	May	Jun	Jul	Aug	Sep	Oct	Nov	Dec	Year
Mean daily maximum °F (°C)	32.3 (0.2)	31.3 (−0.4)	32.4 (0.2)	35.7 (2.1)	44.3 (6.8)	52.7 (11.5)	63.9 (17.7)	63.9 (17.7)	58.6 (14.8)	48.1 (8.9)	36.2 (2.3)	31.3 (−0.4)	44.2 (6.8)
Daily mean °F (°C)	25.7 (−3.5)	23.7 (−4.6)	24.1 (−4.4)	26.5 (−3.1)	34.1 (1.2)	41.7 (5.4)	51.4 (10.8)	51.2 (10.7)	46.4 (8.0)	37.8 (3.2)	29.3 (−1.5)	25.0 (−3.9)	34.7 (1.5)
Mean daily minimum °F (°C)	19.1 (−7.2)	16.0 (−8.9)	15.7 (−9.1)	17.2 (−8.2)	23.8 (−4.6)	30.7 (−0.7)	38.9 (3.8)	38.6 (3.7)	34.2 (1.2)	27.4 (−2.6)	22.4 (−5.3)	18.6 (−7.4)	25.2 (−3.8)
Average precipitation inches (mm)	12.67 (322)	8.83 (224)	7.89 (200)	5.08 (129)	4.63 (118)	2.16 (55)	0.57 (14)	0.59 (15)	1.68 (43)	3.75 (95)	10.53 (267)	14.67 (373)	73.05 (1,855)
Source: PRISM Climate Group

== Ecology ==
About 20 tree species can be found throughout Mount McLoughlin's surroundings, including Pacific yew at low elevations, mountain hemlock, whitebark pine, and subalpine fir at higher elevations, and lodgepole pine and red fir throughout. Other plant species include shrubs, wildflowers, junipers, heather, columbine, kinnikinnick, huckleberry, chinquapins, grouse huckleberry, and bearberry.

Common fauna in the area include chipmunks, deer, elk, American black bears, coyotes, while yellow-bellied marmots, fishers, pikas, and American martens are less common. More than 150 bird species live in the Big Butte Creek watershed near McLoughlin. Eagles and hawks can be sighted in the vicinity, as can spotted owls. goshawks like to live beneath the tree canopy in the region. Amphibian species like Oregon spotted frogs and Cascades frogs live in certain parts of the watershed. Fish species include Chinook salmon, rainbow trout, Coho salmon, Pacific lamprey, and coastal cutthroat trout.

== Geology ==
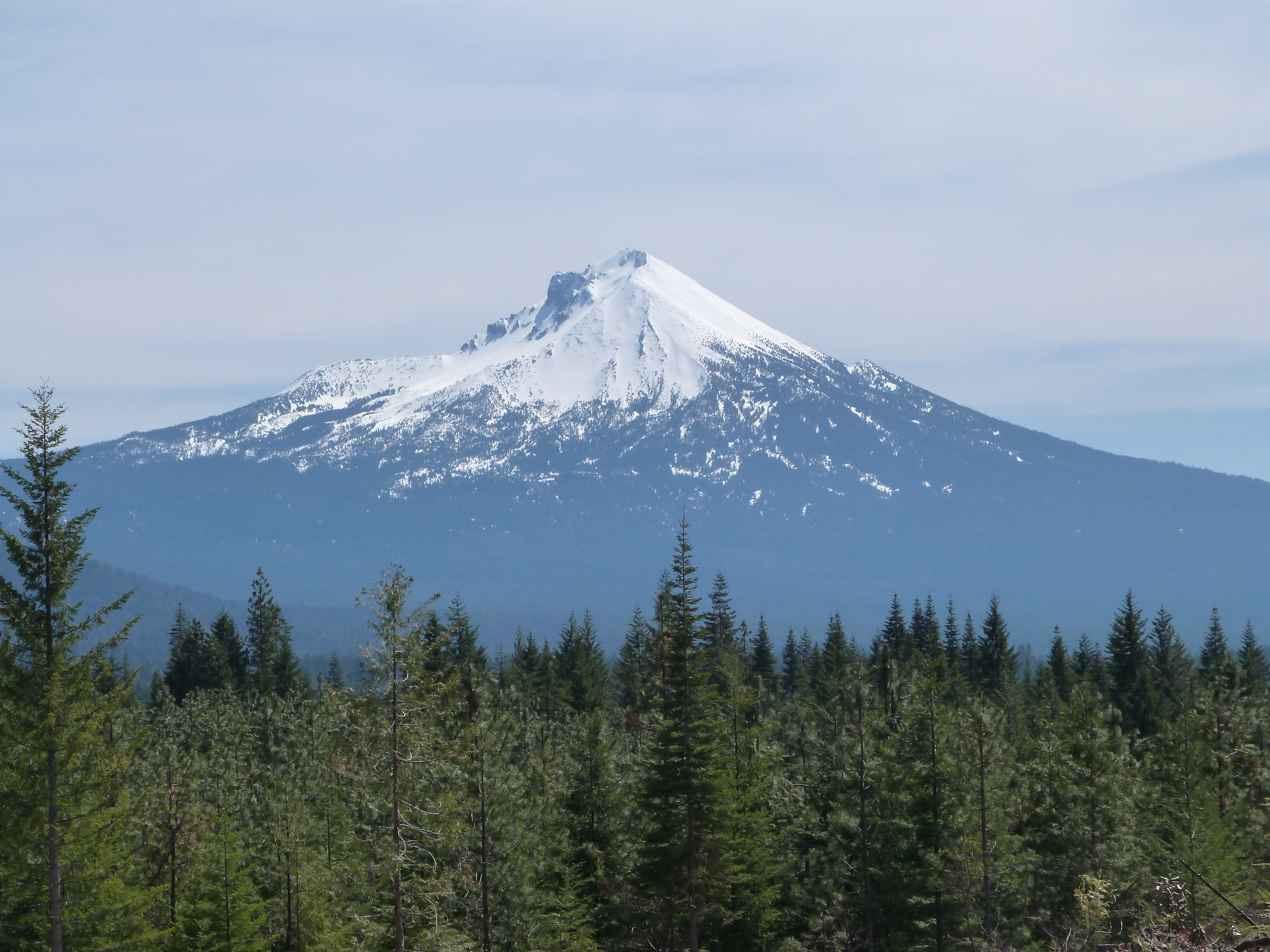
Mount McLoughlin from the north

Little was known about Mount McLoughlin's geology until the 1970s. Much of what is known today comes from LeRoy Maynard of the center for Volcanology at the University of Oregon. His work established that the volcano was built over three eruptive phases, each with their own eruption types. James Smith from the United States Geological Survey expanded on Maynard's findings, producing a map of the McLoughlin region.

McLoughlin is part of the High Cascades, which trend north–south. Formed towards the end of the Pleistocene Epoch, these mountains are underlain by more ancient volcanoes that subsided due to parallel north–south faulting in the surrounding region. Like other Cascade volcanoes, Mount McLoughlin was fed by magma chambers produced by the subduction of the Juan de Fuca tectonic plate under the western edge of the North American tectonic plate. Within Oregon, plutons, or bodies of intrusive igneous rock that crystallize from magma cooling below the surface of the Earth, lay between 47 and 68 mi (75 and 110 km) northwest of the major High Cascade axis. At McLoughlin, mean displacement rates for the past 16 million years have been 0.14 to 0.28 in (3.5 to 7.1 mm) each year.

The volcano shows magnetic high points to the east of its main cone, suggesting that it has normal magnetic polarization that corresponds to an age of less than 700,000 years. Other evidence that the volcano is geologically young include its symmetrical shape on the western and southern sides, its well-preserved lava flow deposits, and the absence of soil formation on many of its flow deposits.

McLoughlin is a stratovolcano, made up of basaltic andesite on top of underlying basaltic andesitic shield volcanoes, though it is also described as a basaltic-andesite lava cone. Much of its central volcanic cone formed within the last 200,000 years, including lava flows on the sides of the mountain that are between 30,000 and 20,000 years old. The volcano has a volume of 3 cu mi (13 km^{3}), and its lava is predominantly basaltic andesite with silicon dioxide content between 53 and 57 percent, though it also has andesite.

During the last ice age, a large ice cap buried most of the High Cascades, reaching thicknesses in the thousands of feet. Pleistocene glaciers carved out McLoughlin's major volcanic cone, excavating two solidified lava tubes that reached the summit crater. From 25,000 to 12,000 years ago, glaciers on the northern slopes of the volcano combined with an ice cap at the base of the volcano that was about 500 feet (150 m) thick. A cirque glacier occupied part of the depression until early in the 20th century. The volcano displays a lack of snow during the summer season.

=== Nearby features ===
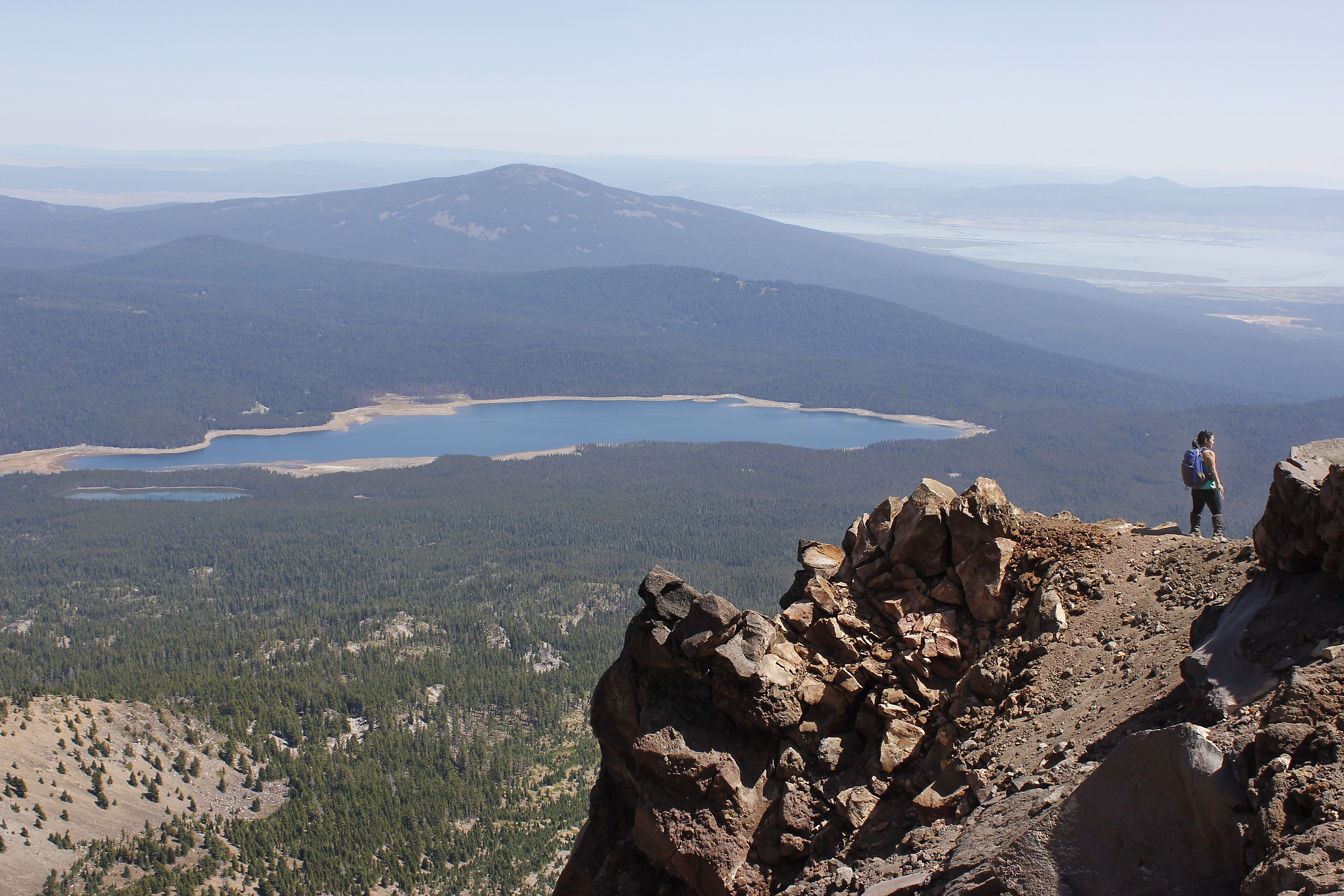
View of Pelican Butte and Fourmile Lake from near summit

Two nearby volcanoes closely resemble Mount McLoughlin in composition. Brown Mountain, a shield volcano with a volume of 1 cubic mile (4.2 km^{3}), lies to the southeast, while Pelican Butte, the most prominent shield volcano in the southern Cascades of Oregon, lies to the east.

Brown Mountain has been dated to between 60,000 and 12,000 years old. It produced basaltic andesite lava flows that have not been heavily eroded, but during Pleistocene glacial advance, ice streams on the volcano ate away at the cinder cone that formed Brown Mountain's summit. This formed a glacial cirque with a bowl shape on the northeastern flank.

Pelican Butte reaches an elevation of 8,036 ft (2,449 m), and it features gradual slopes. Adjacent to Klamath Lake, it has a greater volume than McLoughlin at 5 cu mi (21 km^{3}), and it is made up of basaltic andesite. Like Brown Mountain, Pelican Butte has a cinder cone on the top of its summit, in addition to a glacial cirque and ravine that were excavated on its northeastern side. These eroded areas exhibit pyroclastic rock in a matrix with lava flows, suggesting that blocky and ʻaʻā lavas formed an outer shell around Pelican Butte's fragmented interior. Glaciation has also lowered the overall volcano by tens of yards.

Other volcanoes can be found within the Sky Lakes Wilderness area, including lava flows and mud flows at Big Bunchgrass Butte and Imagination Peak, in addition to more recent eruptive activity at Goosenest Mountain in the northeastern sector.

== Eruptive history ==
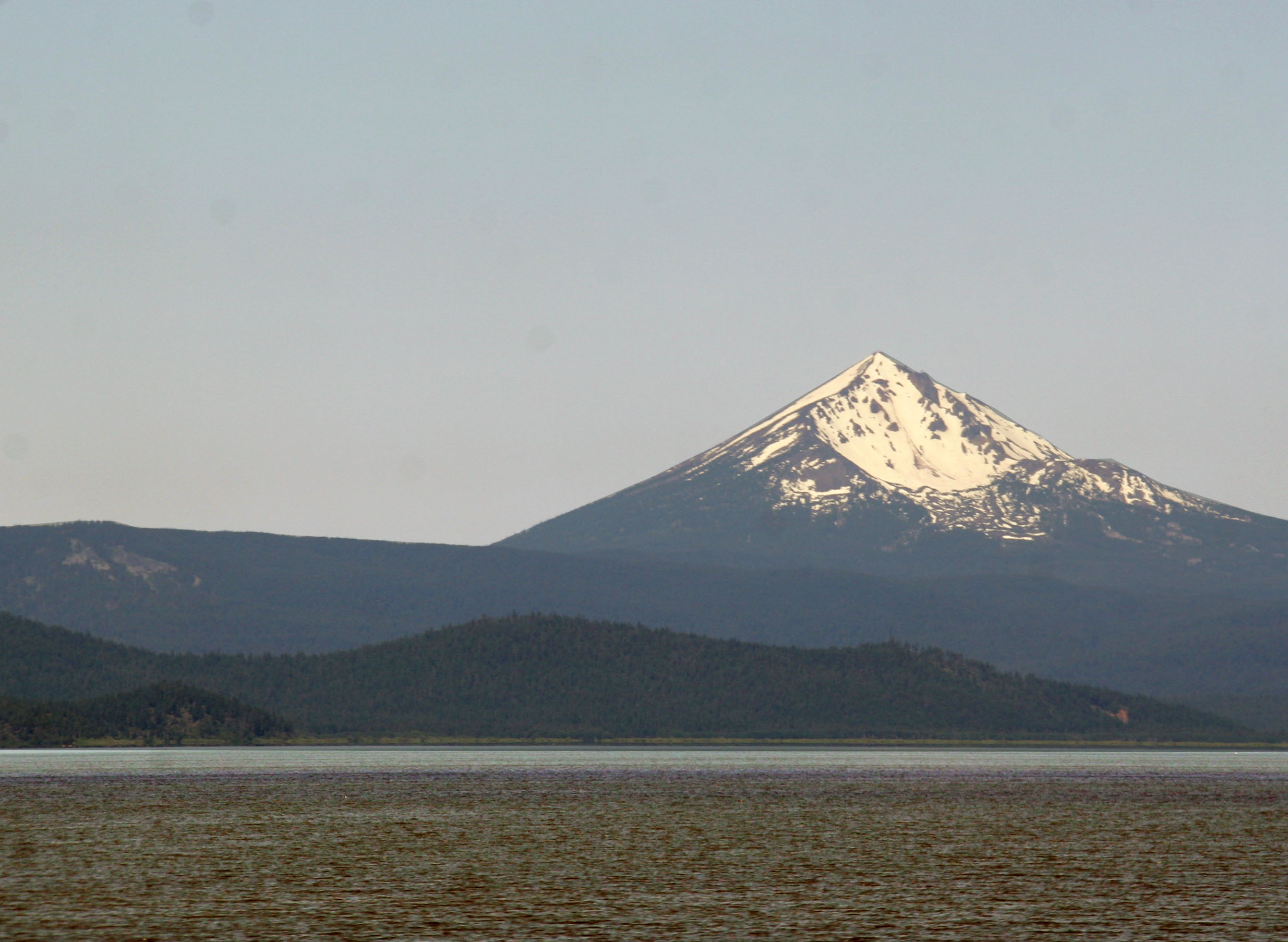
Mount McLoughlin from the Upper Klamath Lake, showing its summit cone

Mount McLoughlin underwent at least three distinct eruptive phases. Early activity at Mount McLoughlin was explosive, and it yielded tephra and pyroclastic rock that built about a third of the overall volume. These eruptions also yielded lava flows, but they only occurred on the lower flanks. The northwestern flank has volcanic vents that produced lava flows responsible for inundating the Fourbit Creek valley 4 mi (6.4 km) from the base of McLoughlin, which extend up to the Big Butte Springs. Other lava flows from earlier eruptions reach at least 6 mi (9.7 km) from the base of the mountain, a number of which run along the Oregon Route 140 highway. One ʻaʻā stream that filled a river valley for 6 mi (9.7 km) in length moved from an elevation of 5,000 ft (1,500 m) to 3,000 ft (910 m), though it was thin, with more than 2.5 mi (4.0 km) of its length being less than 500 ft (150 m) in width.

A second eruptive stage was characterized by large lava flows, which covered the inner pyroclastic core with basaltic andesite. These thin lava flows formed a shell around the loosely compacted pyroclastic interior. The third stage of development consisted of floods of blocky lava erupting from below the summit and more fluid lavas erupting from basal fissures, mostly confined to the south slope. Wilámxa Tip and Máalsi Tip on McLoughlin's west flank now mark the site of the two major blocky flow vents. There are two smaller vents as well. The entire third stage is thought to have happened after the last Pleistocene glaciers in the area had melted, due to a general lack of weathering and fresh appearance of the solidified lava. The freshest lava flows at Mount McLoughlin occur on the southern and western flanks of the mountain, and they are thought to be between 30,000 and 20,000 years old.

=== Future activity ===
Mount McLoughlin's main volcanic cone has not erupted during the Holocene, with the last production of lava flows taking place between 30,000 and 20,000 years ago. The volcano is not currently monitored for activity or deformation. The closest seismic monitoring stations lie 62 mi (100 km) to the south near Mount Shasta and the Medicine Lake Volcano.

== Human history ==
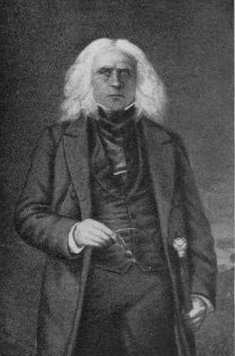
Mount McLoughlin got its official name from John McLoughlin (pictured), a factor for the Hudson's Bay Company

McLouglin has served as a landmark to Native American populations and others for thousands of years. Indigenous peoples utilized the area to hunt and gather berries. The Takelma people referred to it as "Mal-sr" or "Alwilamchaldis", one of their mythical heroes, and they considered it the home of Tasuune, or the "Acorn Woman", a being that helped their acorns grow every year. In the culture of the Shasta people, McLoughlin was known as "Makayax"; the Klamath people named the volcano "Walum" and "Kesh yainatat", meaning the home of the "dwarf old woman" that controlled the west wind. McLoughlin was called "Melaiksi" by the Modoc people. The Little Butte Creek which drains from McLoughlin was called "So-ytanak", translating as "corner" or "rock house", by the Upper Takelma people.

First detected by an American explorer Peter Skene Ogden in 1827, McLoughlin has a complex name-place history. Ogden called the volcano "Mt. Sastise" after the Shasta Native Americans that helped him reach the Rogue Valley; this name was later exchanged with Mount Shasta in northern California, then called "Pit Mountain". To local residents, Mount McLoughlin's English name was Mount Pitt, though it came to be referred to by other names including Mt. John Quincy Adams, Mt. Clear View, Snowy Butte, and Mt. Madison, also appearing in maps as Mount Pitt, Mount Simpson, and Mount Jackson. Though the volcano was also known as Mount McLoughlin during the 1800s, it was officially renamed in 1905 by the Oregon Legislative Assembly after Dr. John McLoughlin, a factor for the Hudson's Bay Company noted for helping American settlers in the 1830s and 1840s. An important figure in the local fur trade, McLoughlin was also known as the "Father of Oregon". The change from Pitt to McLoughlin was later confirmed by the United States Board on Geographic Names in 1912.

The area around Mount McLoughlin was frequented by fur trappers and explorers, but they did not settle for long stays in the area. Settlers living near the surrounding today’s Sky Lakes Wilderness trapped beavers and martens during the winter seasons, hunted, and grazed sheep in warmer months. Stuart Falls and Twin Ponds marked popular spots for picking huckleberries. Trails and fire lookouts were constructed for the Sky Lakes Wilderness area in the early 1900s, with the Pacific Crest Trail expanding into the region during the mid-1970s, superseding the pre-existing Oregon Skyline Trail.

Mount McLoughlin's first known ascent took place in 1858, when Joseph Burpee, William Wilkinson, Dr. Greer, Henry Klippel, John S. Love, and Robert Haines, from the city of Jacksonville, reached the summit from the northeast. The event was reported in a letter published by the Jacksonville Democratic Times on May 28, 1897. In 1896, members of the Mazama mountaineering club including Lottie Reed, Henry Pittock, and Leslie Scott ascended the mountain.

As of 1926, Mount McLoughlin's western flank acts as the municipal watershed for Medford, its melted snow feeding the Big Butte Springs near the city. The summer melting of snow forms a shape that is referred to locally as "the angel wings" or "the diving eagle", which local fishers consider a sign of peak fishing opportunities in the mountain's lakes.

== Recreation ==
Mount McLoughlin has a 5-mile (8.0 km) hiking trail to its summit, a six hour round-trip which gains about 4,000 feet (1,200 m) in elevation. While the route receives moderate to heavy use each year, ascent to the peak is easiest from July through September, when the trailhead is accessible by vehicle and snow is minimal along the path. Although there is a creek crossing at the beginning of the trail that currently requires walking across a log or wading through the water until a new bridge is built.

The Mt. McLoughlin Trailhead is on Forest Road 3650, 2.5 miles (4.0 km) north of Oregon Route 140. After about 1 mile (1.6 km), the Mt. McLoughlin Trail joins the Pacific Crest Trail for half a mile, then passes through a forested area for about 2.5 miles (4.0 km) before reaching timberline. The last mile of the route travels over blocky lava and rubble, and the trail above the tree line is less clearly delineated. From the summit, Mount Shasta and Crater Lake can be seen.

During the winter, the climb requires snowshoes, crampons, and ice axes, and is far more challenging than the popular summertime route. The access road from Oregon Route 140 may also be closed due to snow, requiring a longer approach on snowshoes or cross country skis. The mountain can also be skied, which has become more popular in recent years.

== See also ==
- Volcanic Legacy Scenic Byway

== Notes ==
- [a] Other sources list the elevation as 9,496 feet (2,894 m).

== Sources ==
- "Central Big Butte Creek Watershed Analysis" (PDF). Bureau of Land Management. Archived (PDF) from the original on February 24, 2017.
- Dunegan, L. (2013). Hiking Oregon. Rowman & Littlefield.
- Harris, S. L. (2005). "Chapter 9: Mount McLoughlin". Fire Mountains of the West: The Cascade and Mono Lake Volcanoes (Third ed.). Missoula, Montana: Mountain Press Publishing Company. pp. 127–132. ISBN 0-87842-511-X.
- Joslin, L. (2005). The Wilderness Concept and the Three Sisters Wilderness: Deschutes and Willamette National Forests, Oregon. Bend, Oregon: Wilderness Associates. ISBN 978-0-9647167-4-2.
- LaLande, J. M. (1995). From Abbott Butte to Zimmerman Burn : a place-name history and gazetteer of the Rogue River National Forest. Medford, Oregon: United States Forest Service.
- "Lower Big Butte Watershed Analysis" (PDF). Bureau of Land Management. September 1999. Archived (PDF) from the original on February 27, 2017.
- Norris, R. D. (1991). The Cascade Volcanoes: Monitoring History and Current Land Management Open-File Report 91-31 (PDF). United States Geological Survey. Archived (PDF) from the original on May 2, 2017.
- "Upper Big Butte Watershed Analysis" (PDF). Rogue River National Forest. December 1995. Archived (PDF) from the original on August 11, 2017.
- Smoot, J. (2012). Best Climbs Cascade Volcanoes. Rowman & Littlefield.
- Strayed, C. (2013). Wild: From Lost to Found on the Pacific Crest Trail. Vintage Books.
- Van Tilburg, C. (2001). Backcountry Ski! Oregon: Classic Descents for Skiers & Snowboarders, Including Southwest Washington. Sasquatch Books.
- "Water Quality Restoration Plan" (PDF). Bureau of Land Management. January 2008. Archived (PDF) from the original on July 20, 2017.
- Wells, R. E.; McCaffrey, R. (2013). "Steady rotation of the Cascade arc". Geology. 41 (9): 1027–1030. Bibcode:2013Geo....41.1027W. doi:10.1130/G34514.1.
- Wuerthner, G. (2003). Oregon's Wilderness Areas: The Complete Guide. Big Earth Publishing.
