= Big Butte Springs =

Spring in Oregon, United States

- Location within Oregon
- Interactive map of Big Butte Springs
- Location: Jackson County, Oregon, USA
- Coordinates: 42°30′47″N 122°28′50″W
- Elevation: 2,717 feet (828.1 m)
- Discharge: 26 million US gallons (98,000,000 L) per day
- Temperature: 44–46 °F (6.7–7.8 °C)

Big Butte Springs are natural springs located near the south fork of Big Butte Creek in Jackson County, Oregon, about 30 miles (48 km) north of Medford. It provides 26 million US gallons (98,000,000 L) of high quality water per day. The springs provide enough water to meet the needs of the valley for seven months of the year. During the remaining five months, water is pumped and treated from the Rogue River. The springs provide water to over 115,000 customers.

== Water quality ==
The springs are fed by an 88-square-mile (230 km^{2}) watershed. The water requires minimal treatment to meet water quality standards. The hardness of the springs' water has declined in recent years. In 2007, the springs were tested in 120 different areas, exceeding federal standards in all of them. Water temperatures average between 44 and 46 °F (6.7 and 7.8 °C). The springs have very little chemical pollution, and low turbidity. The flow of the springs remains steady throughout the year.

== History ==
Beginning in 1908, Medford received drinking water from Fish Lake. Several years later, the surrounding land was not cleared of debris when the Fish Lake dam was expanded. Soon, the woody debris rotted, and the water was determined undrinkable. In 1923, the Medford Water Commission received water rights to 30 to 60 cubic feet per second (0.85 to 1.70 m^{3}/s) of water from Big Butte Springs. The Medford Aqueduct, a 31-inch (79 cm) pipeline, was finished in 1927, transferring about 40 cubic feet per second (1.1 m^{3}/s) of drinking water to residents of the Bear Creek watershed. In 1951, another pipeline was added.
