= Sky Lakes Wilderness =

Wilderness area in the southern Cascade Range of Oregon

- IUCN category Ib (wilderness area)
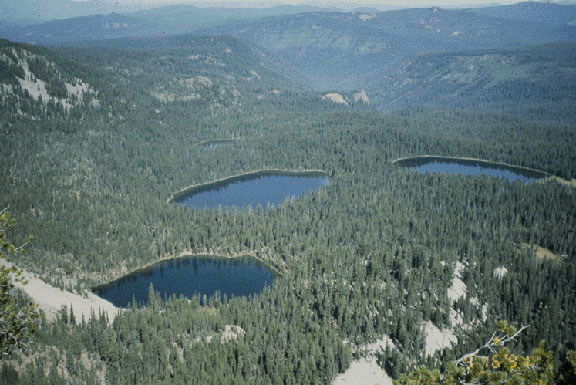
- Seven Lakes Basin from Devil's Peak
- Interactive map of Sky Lakes Wilderness
- Location: Klamath / Jackson counties, Oregon, United States
- Nearest city: Chiloquin, Oregon
- Coordinates: 42°37′07″N 122°13′52″W
- Area: 116,300 acres (47,065 ha)
- Established: 1984
- Governing body: United States Forest Service

The Sky Lakes Wilderness is a wilderness area located in the Rogue River–Siskiyou and Fremont–Winema national forests in the southern Cascade Range of Oregon in the United States. It comprises 116,300 acres (47,100 ha), of which 75,695 acres (30,633 ha) are in the Rogue River–Siskiyou National Forest and 40,605 acres (16,432 ha) are in the Fremont–Winema National Forest. It was established in 1984 under the Wilderness Act of 1964.

== Topography ==
The Sky Lakes Wilderness straddles southern Oregon's Cascade Range from Crater Lake National Park southward to Oregon Route 140. It is approximately 6 miles (9.7 km) wide and 27 miles (43 km) long, with elevations ranging from 3,800 feet (1,200 m) in the canyon of the Middle Fork of the Rogue River to 9,495 feet (2,894 m) at the top of Mount McLoughlin, the highest peak in southern Oregon and the highest point in the Cascade Range between the Three Sisters and Mount Shasta.

The Wilderness contains more than 200 pools of water, from small ponds to lakes of 30 to 40 acres (12 to 16 ha). Fourmile Lake, near the southern end of the area, exceeds 900 acres (360 ha). Several of the lakes at Sky Lakes, including Alta and Natasha, are found to have among the most chemically pure water known of all lakes in the world.

== Geology ==
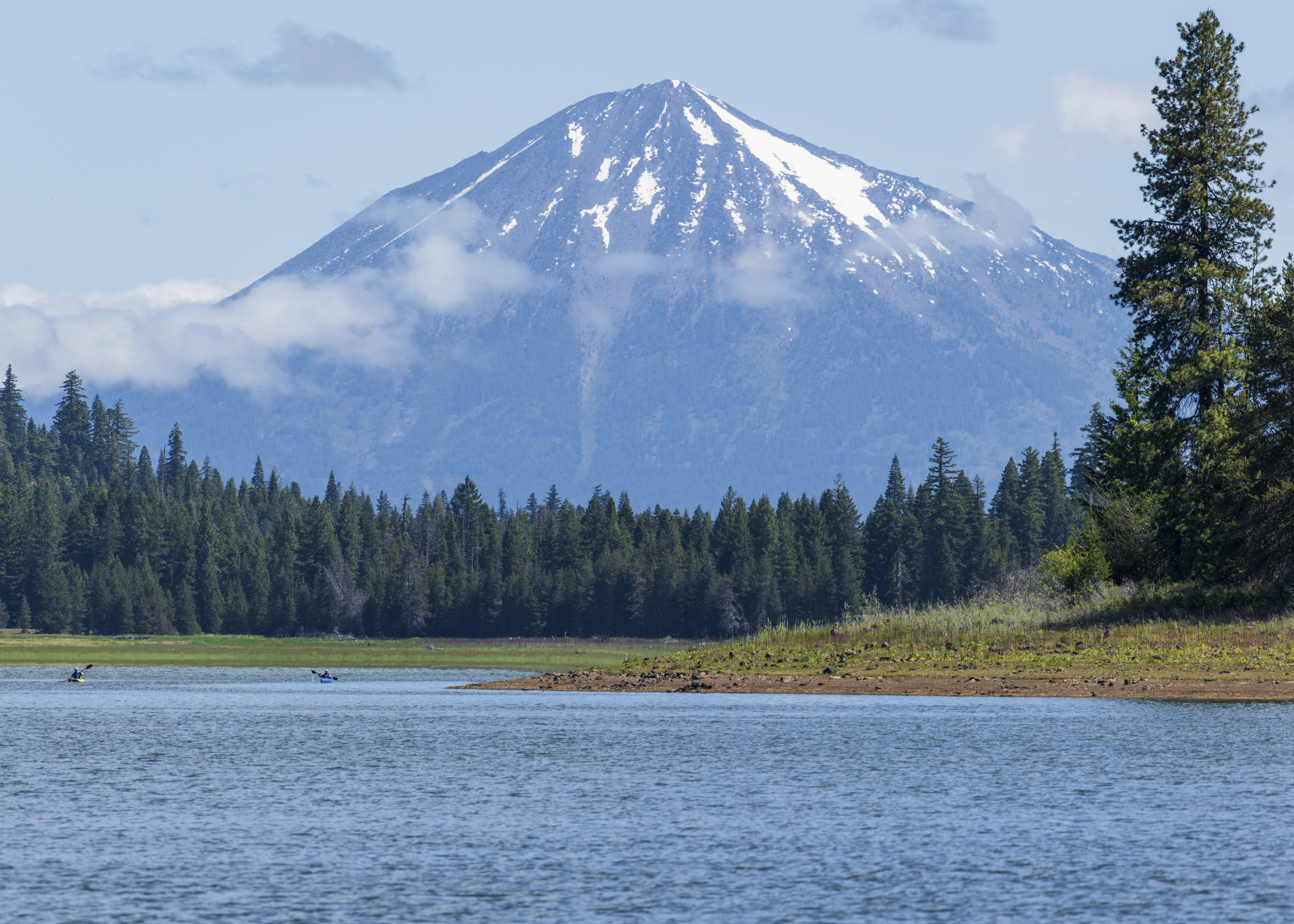
Mount McLoughlin in the Sky Lakes Wilderness

Geologic studies indicate that the earliest rocks in this part of the High Cascades began forming when a chain of volcanoes erupted between five and three million years ago. During the last glacial period, the composite volcanoes of Mount Mazama and Mount McLoughlin began their initial build-up. On their north and east slopes, Mount McLoughlin and other peaks bear scars caused by glaciers. Like most other major drainages within the Sky Lakes Wilderness, Seven Lakes Basin and the deep canyon of the Middle Fork of the Rogue River were carved by the massive ice fields that covered the highest elevations of the Cascades. Approximately 6,700 years ago, when Mount Mazama exploded, collapsed, and formed the caldera of Crater Lake, some of the vast amount of rock and ash thrown into the air landed in the northern portion of the Sky Lakes Wilderness, creating the pumice-covered Oregon Desert.

== Vegetation ==
Many plant species thrive in the Sky Lakes Wilderness, including nearly two dozen tree species. These range from the Pacific yew and Engelmann spruce in the lowlands to the mountain hemlock and subalpine fir at the higher elevations. Shasta red fir dominates much of the wilderness, and lodgepole pine is common but is in its element in the Oregon Desert portion of the wilderness. Whitebark pine is an uncommon tree in the area but can be found high on the slopes of Mount McLoughlin and Devil's Peak. The forest's understory is dominated by species of huckleberry, manzanita, kinnikinnick, snowbrush, and heather.

== Wildlife ==
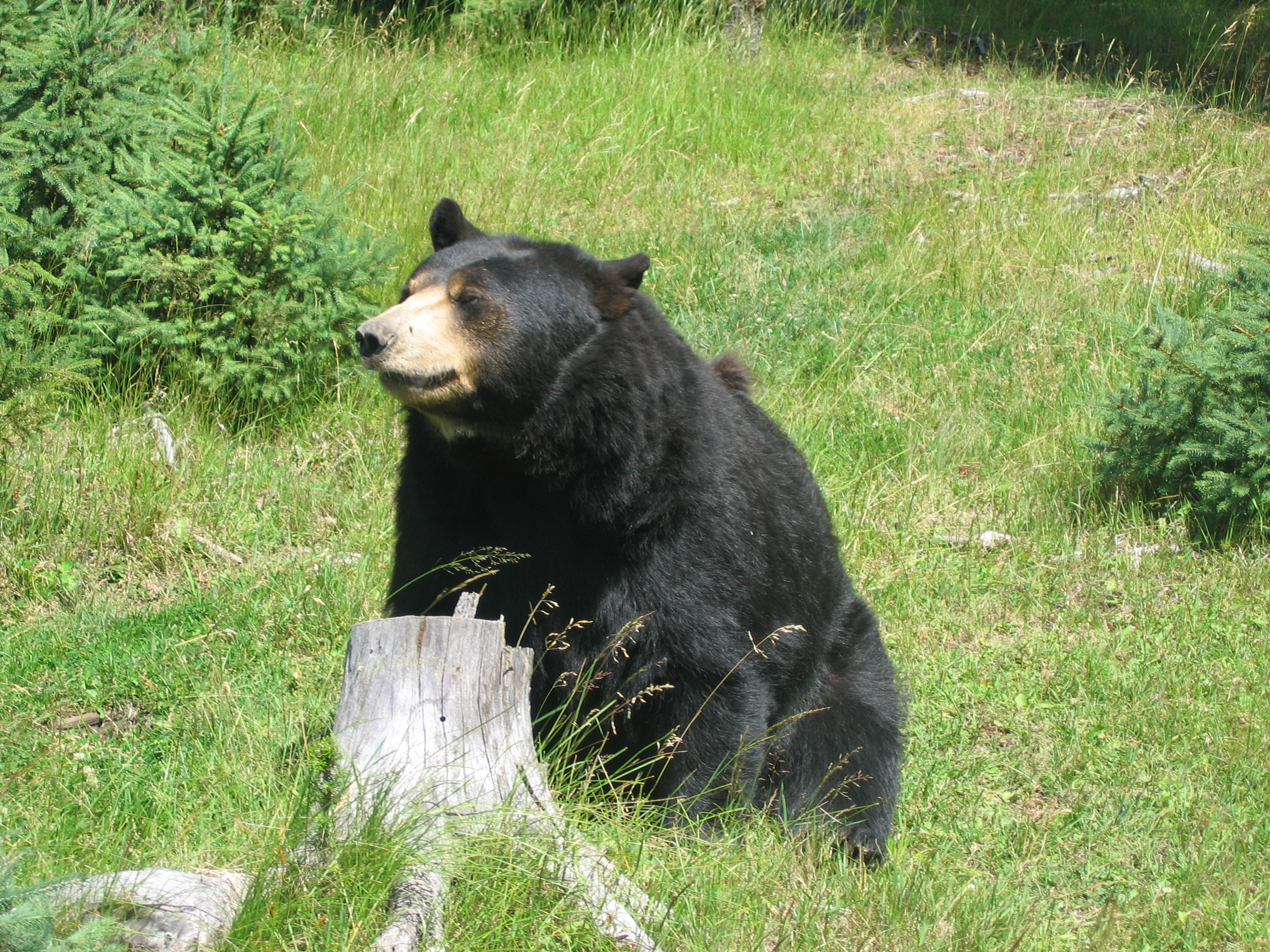
American black bear

Elk herds spend much of the summer and early fall in the northern third of the Sky Lakes Wilderness. The entire wilderness supports roving populations pine martens and fishers, black bears, cougars, coyotes, as well as pikas, golden-mantled ground squirrels, goshawks and various other species of wildlife. During October and November, migrating birds pass over in the hundreds of thousands, often stopping at the high lakes. Ospreys, eagles, and other large hawks can occasionally be seen around the Sky Lakes. Uncommon animals in the area include the yellow-bellied marmot, the fisher, and the pine marten.

Game fish are stocked annually in the Sky Lakes by the State of Oregon. These include brook trout, rainbow trout, cutthroat trout, and kokanee. Cutthroat trout are only stocked in Big Heavenly Twin and Isherwood lakes, and kokanee are only stocked at Fourmile Lake.

== History ==
Beginning several thousand years ago, Native American groups, ancestors of the Klamath and the Takelma people, hunted game and gathered huckleberries in the Sky Lakes Wilderness. However, prehistoric visitors did not spend a significant amount of time in the area due to the short season of mild weather and the limited variety of food plants and animals. Prehistoric stone tools have been found in the wilderness.

The early non-native settlers hunted, trapped beaver and marten, and grazed their stock in the high meadows. Settlers from lower-elevation communities would travel to pick huckleberries at places like Stuart Falls and Twin Ponds. After 1906, the newly established United States Forest Service built trails and fire lookouts within the Sky Lakes area.

== Recreation ==
The Pacific Crest Trail passes through the entire Sky Lakes Wilderness from north to south for about 35 miles (56 km). The three main lake basins see quite a bit of use, particularly at the larger lakes, which are popular fishing, hiking, and camping destinations. Hunting is popular in the wilderness, especially for elk.

=== Points of interest ===
The Twin Ponds Trail follows the route of the old Rancheria Trail, a Native American travel route. In 1863, it was widened and used as a military wagon road between Jacksonville and Fort Klamath. This portion of the Rancheria Trail is listed on the National Register of Historic Places, and many segments of the old wagon route are visible from the trail.

At the southeast end of Island Lake is Waldo Tree. This inscribed Shasta red fir bears the carved names of early-day Oregon conservationist Judge John B. Waldo and four companions. In 1888, these men hiked south along the crest of the Cascades, from Waldo Lake to Mount Shasta. They were the first recorded party to travel much of the general route of what is now the Pacific Crest Trail.

== See also ==
- Wilderness Act
- List of Oregon Wildernesses
- List of U.S. Wilderness Areas
