= Brown Mountain (Klamath County, Oregon) =

Mountain in Oregon, United States

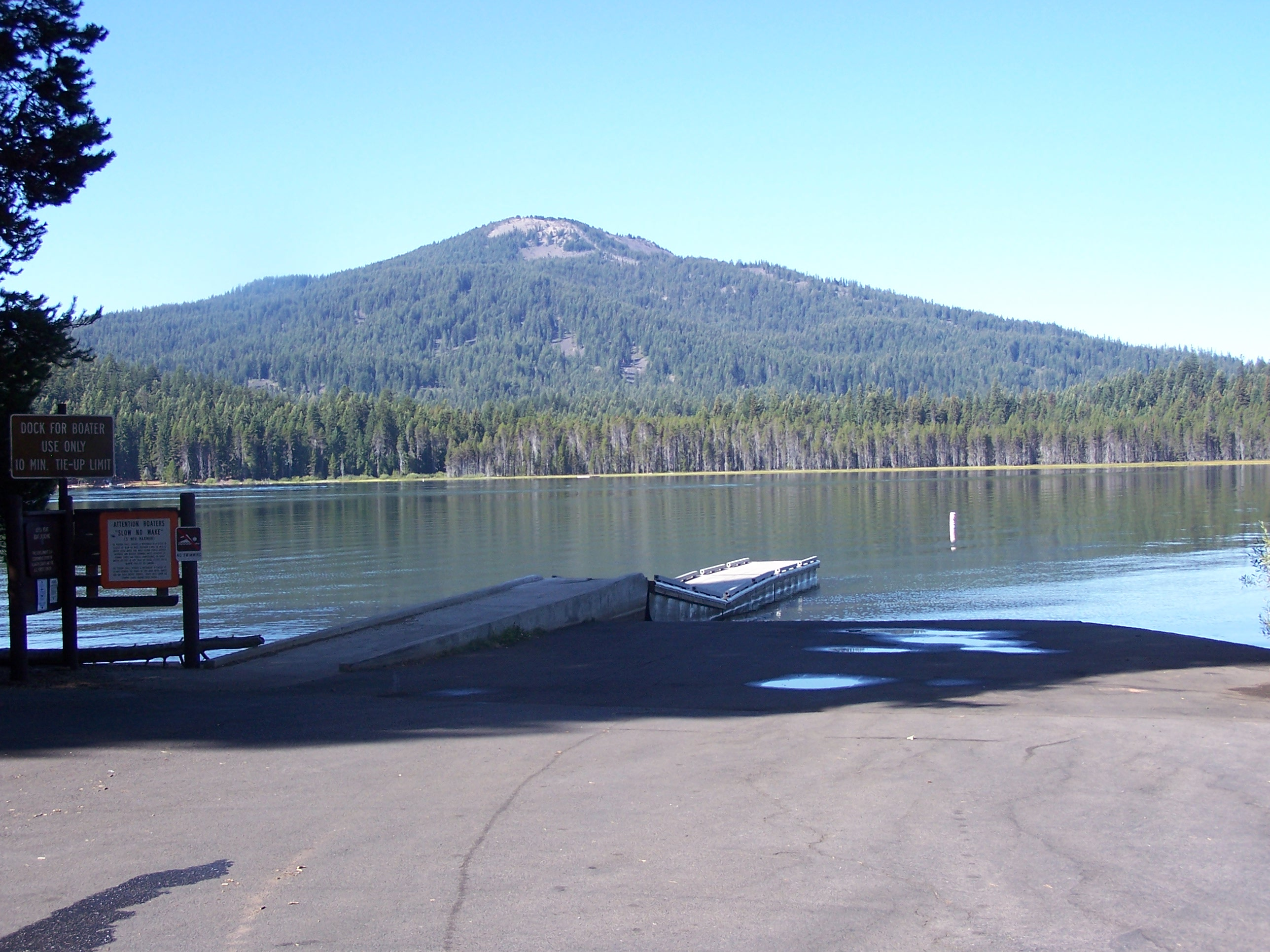
- Brown Mountain from across Lake of the Woods

Highest point
- Elevation: 7344+ ft (2238+ m) NAVD 88
- Prominence: 2,058 ft (627 m)
- Coordinates: 42°21′48″N 122°16′17″W

Geography
- Location within Oregon
- Location: Klamath / Jackson counties, Oregon, U.S.
- Topo map: USGS Brown Mountain

Geology
- Mountain type: Shield volcano
- Volcanic arc: Cascade Volcanic Arc
- Last eruption: Over 12,000 years ago

Climbing
- Easiest route: Scramble

Brown Mountain is a small cinder cone on top of a shield volcano located in Cascade Volcanic Arc in Klamath and Jackson counties, Oregon. Most of the mountain, including its peak, is in western Klamath County, but its western flanks trail off into eastern Jackson County. It is 7,344 feet (2,238 m) above sea level, but is overshadowed by nearby 9,495-foot (2,894 m) Mount McLoughlin.

== Geology ==
Brown Mountain appears to be relatively young at first as its summit is unweathered and devoid of trees, however glacial valleys and a cirque near the summit prove that the mountain is actually twelve thousand to sixty thousand years old. Around two thousand years ago, a large lava flow consisting primarily of basaltic andesite covered 13 square miles (34 km^{2}) of the north and western slopes with Aa-type lava over 250 feet (76 m) thick. Over its lifetime, the mountain has erupted over 1.2 cubic miles (5.0 km^{3}) of lava.

== Access and trails ==
Brown Mountain can be accessed via Oregon Route 140, which passes just north of the peak. It can also be accessed through the Pacific Crest Trail, and the 6.8-mile (10.9 km) Brown Mountain Trail.

== Flora and fauna ==
The area at the base of the mountain is covered with old growth forests. The mountain is also home to animals such as Douglas squirrels and pikas. Toward the summit, the land is nearly devoid of vegetation.
