= Seven Devils (disambiguation) =

Seven Devils is a solitaire card game.

Seven Devils may also refer to:

- Seven Devils, North Carolina
- Seven Devils Mountains, Idaho
- "Seven Devils", a track on the Florence and the Machine album Ceremonials
- Seven Devils Lake, Arkansas
- Seven Devils State Recreation Site, Oregon
