= Crissey Field State Recreation Site =

State recreation area in Oregon, USA

- Location within Oregon Location within the United States
- Interactive map of Crissey Field State Recreation Site
- Type: Public, state
- Location: Curry County, Oregon
- Nearest city: Brookings
- Coordinates: 42°00′06″N 124°12′39″W
- Operator: Oregon Parks and Recreation Department

Crissey Field State Recreation Site is a state park in the U.S. state of Oregon, administered by the Oregon Parks and Recreation Department. It is the south-westernmost point in the state of Oregon.

The northern boundary of the park is the Winchuck River. The southern border is indeterminate, varying by source. However it clearly ends a few hundred feet into California, north of Pelican Beach State Park.

The park is named after the abandoned airfield contained within it, Crissey Airport. The runway is now a beach access footpath.

== See also ==
- Winchuck State Recreation Site, another state park 0.5 miles (0.80 km) northeast of Crissey
- List of Oregon state parks
