= List of Oregon state parks =

Oregon State Parks (Hover mouse over pog to pop up clickable link.)

This is a list of state parks and other facilities managed by the State Parks and Recreation Department of Oregon.

The variety of locales and amenities of the parks reflect the diverse geography of Oregon, including beaches, forests, lakes, rock pinnacles, and deserts. The state parks offer many outdoor recreation opportunities, such as overnight camping facilities, day hiking, fishing, boating, historic sites, astronomy, and scenic rest stops and viewpoints. Oregon State Parks celebrated its 100-year anniversary in 2022 with events throughout the year.

== Regions ==
The Parks and Recreation Department classifies its parks according to these regions:

- North Coast – From the Columbia River to just south of Lincoln City
- Central Coast – From Lincoln City to Oregon Dunes National Recreation Area
- South Coast – From the Dunes NRA to California
- Willamette Valley – From the south edge of the Portland metro area south to Cottage Grove
- Southern Oregon – South of the Willamette Valley, from the coast range east through Lake County
- Portland/Columbia River Gorge – Columbia County and the northern Willamette Valley and east along the Columbia River where it passes through the Cascade Range
- Central Oregon – The northern half of the high plateau Great Basin east of the Cascades
- Eastern Oregon – The eastern forty percent of the state

Park name	Type	Region	Park website	Year round	Camping	Close to
Agate Beach State Recreation Site	Recreation site	Central Coast		-	-	Newport
Ainsworth State Park	State park	Portland/Columbia River Gorge		-	Yes	Multnomah Falls
Alderwood State Wayside	Wayside	Willamette Valley		-	-	Junction City
Alfred A. Loeb State Park	State park	South Coast		Yes	Yes	Brookings
Angel's Rest Trailhead	State trail	Portland/Columbia River Gorge		-	-	Hood River
Arcadia Beach State Recreation Site	Recreation site	North Coast		Yes	-	Cannon Beach
Arizona Beach State Recreation Site	Recreation site	South Coast		Yes	-	Port Orford
Bald Peak State Scenic Viewpoint	Scenic viewpoint	Portland/Columbia River Gorge		-	-	Newberg
Bandon State Natural Area	Natural area	South Coast		-	-	Bandon
Banks–Vernonia State Trail	State trail	Portland/Columbia River Gorge		-	-	Vernonia
Bates State Park	State park	Eastern Oregon		-	Yes	Prairie City
Battle Mountain Forest State Scenic Corridor	Scenic corridor	Eastern Oregon		-	-	Ukiah
Beachside State Recreation Site	Recreation site	Central Coast		-	Yes	Waldport
Benson State Recreation Area	Recreation area	Portland/Columbia River Gorge		-	-	Multnomah Falls
Beverly Beach State Park	State park	Central Coast		Yes	Yes	Newport
Blue Mountain Forest State Scenic Corridor	Scenic corridor	Eastern Oregon		-	-	La Grande
Bob Straub State Park	State park	North Coast		Yes	-	Pacific City
Boiler Bay State Scenic Viewpoint	Scenic viewpoint	Central Coast		-	-	Depoe Bay
Bolon Island Tideways State Scenic Corridor	Scenic corridor	South Coast		-	-	Reedsport
Bonnie Lure State Recreation Area	Recreation area	Portland/Columbia River Gorge		-	-	Estacada
Booth State Scenic Corridor	Scenic corridor	Southern Oregon		-	-	Lakeview
Bradley State Scenic Viewpoint	Scenic viewpoint	North Coast		Yes	-	Astoria
Brian Booth State Park	State park	Central Coast		Yes	-	Newport
Bridal Veil Falls State Scenic Viewpoint	Scenic viewpoint	Portland/Columbia River Gorge		-	-	Multnomah Falls
Bullards Beach State Park	State park	South Coast		Yes	Yes	Bandon
Cape Arago State Park	State park	South Coast		Yes	-	Coos Bay
Cape Blanco State Park	State park	South Coast		Yes	Yes	Port Orford
Cape Kiwanda State Natural Area	Natural area	North Coast		Yes	-	Pacific City
Cape Lookout State Park	State park	North Coast		Yes	Yes	Tillamook
Cape Meares State Scenic Viewpoint	Scenic viewpoint	North Coast		Yes	-	Tillamook
Cape Sebastian State Scenic Corridor	Scenic corridor	South Coast		Yes	-	Gold Beach
Carl G. Washburne Memorial State Park	State park	Central Coast		Yes	Yes	Florence
Casey State Recreation Site	Recreation site	Southern Oregon		-	-	Medford
Catherine Creek State Park	State park	Eastern Oregon		-	Yes	Union
Champoeg State Heritage Area	Heritage area	Willamette Valley		Yes	Yes	Newberg
Chandler State Wayside	Wayside	Southern Oregon		-	-	Lakeview
Clay Myers State Natural Area at Whalen Island	Natural area	North Coast		-	-	Pacific City
Cline Falls State Scenic Viewpoint	Scenic viewpoint	Central Oregon		-	-	Redmond
Clyde Holliday State Recreation Site	Recreation site	Eastern Oregon		-	Yes	John Day
Collier Memorial State Park	State park	Southern Oregon		-	Yes	Klamath Falls
Coquille Myrtle Grove State Natural Site	Natural site	South Coast		-	-	Myrtle Point
Cottonwood Canyon State Park	State park	Central Oregon		?	Yes	Moro
Crissey Field State Recreation Site	Recreation site	South Coast		-	-	Brookings
Crown Point State Scenic Corridor	Scenic corridor	Portland/Columbia River Gorge		-	-	Troutdale
D River State Recreation Site	Recreation site	Central Coast		-	-	Lincoln City
Dabney State Recreation Area	Recreation area	Portland/Columbia River Gorge		Yes	-	Troutdale
Darlingtonia State Natural Site	Natural site	Central Coast		Yes	-	Florence
Del Rey Beach State Recreation Site	Recreation site	North Coast		-	-	Gearhart
Deschutes River State Recreation Area	Recreation area	Central Oregon		Yes	Yes	The Dalles
Detroit Lake State Recreation Area	Recreation area	Willamette Valley		-	Yes	Detroit
Devils Lake State Recreation Area	Recreation area	Central Coast		Yes	Yes	Lincoln City
Devils Punch Bowl State Natural Area	Natural area	Central Coast		-	-	Newport
Dexter State Recreation Site	Recreation site	Willamette Valley		Yes	-	Springfield
Driftwood Beach State Recreation Site	Recreation site	Central Coast		Yes	-	Waldport
Dyer State Wayside	Wayside	Eastern Oregon	-	-	-	Condon
Ecola State Park	State park	North Coast		-	-	Cannon Beach
Elijah Bristow State Park	State park	Willamette Valley		-	-	Eugene
Ellmaker State Wayside	Wayside	Central Coast		-	-	Newport
Emigrant Springs State Heritage Area	Heritage area	Eastern Oregon		Yes	Yes	Pendleton
Erratic Rock State Natural Site	Natural site	Willamette Valley		Yes	-	Sheridan
Face Rock State Scenic Viewpoint	Scenic viewpoint	South Coast		-	-	Bandon
Fall Creek State Recreation Site	Recreation site	Willamette Valley		-	Yes	Springfield
Farewell Bend State Recreation Area	Recreation area	Eastern Oregon		Yes	Yes	Ontario
Fogarty Creek State Recreation Area	Recreation area	Central Coast		-	-	Depoe Bay
Fort Rock Cave (near Fort Rock State Natural Area)	National Historic Landmark	Central Oregon		-	-	Fort Rock
Fort Rock State Natural Area	Natural area	Central Oregon		-	-	Fort Rock
Fort Stevens State Park	State park	North Coast		Yes	Yes	Astoria
Fort Yamhill State Heritage Area	Heritage area	Willamette Valley		Yes	-	Grand Ronde
Frenchglen Hotel State Heritage Site	Heritage site	Eastern Oregon		-	-	Burns
Geisel Monument State Heritage Site	Heritage site	South Coast		-	-	Gold Beach
George W. Joseph State Natural Area (accessible from Guy W. Talbot State Park)	Natural area	Portland/Columbia River Gorge		-	-	Troutdale
Gleneden Beach State Recreation Site	Recreation area	Central Coast		-	-	Lincoln City
Golden and Silver Falls State Natural Area	Natural area	South Coast		Yes	-	Coos Bay
Golden State Heritage Site	Heritage site	Southern Oregon		Yes	-	Grants Pass
Goose Lake State Recreation Area	Recreation area	Southern Oregon		-	Yes	Lakeview
Government Island State Recreation Area	Recreation area	Portland/Columbia River Gorge		Yes	Yes	Portland
Governor Patterson Memorial State Recreation Site	Recreation site	Central Coast		-	-	Waldport
Guy W. Talbot State Park	State park	Portland/Columbia River Gorge		-	-	Troutdale
H. B. Van Duzer Forest State Scenic Corridor	Scenic corridor	North Coast		-	-	Lincoln City
Harris Beach State Park	State park	South Coast		Yes	Yes	Brookings
Hat Rock State Park	State park	Eastern Oregon		-	-	Umatilla
Heceta Head Lighthouse State Scenic Viewpoint	Scenic viewpoint	Central Coast		Yes	-	Florence
Heritage Landing (Deschutes)	Boat launch (across from Deschutes River SRA)	Portland/Columbia River Gorge		-	-	The Dalles
Hilgard Junction State Park	State park	Eastern Oregon		-	Yes	La Grande
Historic Columbia River Highway State Trail	State trail	Portland/Columbia River Gorge		Yes	-	Cascade Locks
Hoffman Memorial State Wayside	Wayside	South Coast		-	-	Myrtle Point
Holman State Wayside	Wayside	Willamette Valley		-	-	Salem
Hug Point State Recreation Site	Recreation site	North Coast		-	-	Cannon Beach
Humbug Mountain State Park	State park	South Coast		Yes	Yes	Port Orford
Illinois River Forks State Park	State park	Southern Oregon		-	-	Cave Junction
Iwetemlaykin State Heritage Site	Heritage site	Eastern Oregon		Yes	No	Joseph
Jackson F. Kimball State Recreation Site	Recreation site	Southern Oregon		-	Yes	Fort Klamath
Jasper Point Campground	Campground	Central Oregon		-	Yes	Prineville
Jasper State Recreation Site	Recreation site	Willamette Valley		-	-	Springfield
Jessie M. Honeyman Memorial State Park	State park	Central Coast		Yes	Yes	Florence
John B. Yeon State Scenic Corridor	Scenic corridor	Portland/Columbia River Gorge		-	-	Cascade Locks
Kam Wah Chung State Heritage Site	Heritage site	Eastern Oregon		-	-	John Day
Koberg Beach State Recreation Site	Recreation site	Portland/Columbia River Gorge		Yes	-	Hood River
L. L. "Stub" Stewart State Park	State park	Portland/Columbia River Gorge		Yes	Yes	Vernonia
La Pine State Park	State park	Central Oregon		Yes	Yes	La Pine
Lake Owyhee State Park	State park	Eastern Oregon		-	Yes	Nyssa
Lewis and Clark State Recreation Site	Recreation site	Portland/Columbia River Gorge		Yes	-	Troutdale
Lost Creek State Recreation Site	Recreation site	Central Coast		Yes	-	Newport
Lowell State Recreation Site	Recreation site	Willamette Valley		Yes	-	Springfield
Luckiamute State Natural Area	Natural area	Willamette Valley		-	-	Corvallis
Manhattan Beach State Recreation Site	Recreation site	North Coast		-	-	Rockaway Beach
Maud Williamson State Recreation Site	Recreation site	Willamette Valley		Yes	-	Salem
Mayer State Park	State park	Portland/Columbia River Gorge		-	-	The Dalles
McVay Rock State Recreation Site	Recreation site	South Coast		Yes	-	Brookings
Memaloose State Park	State park	Portland/Columbia River Gorge		-	Yes	The Dalles
Milo McIver State Park	State park	Portland/Columbia River Gorge		-	Yes	Estacada
Minam State Recreation Area	Recreation area	Eastern Oregon		-	Yes	Elgin
Mitchell Point Trailhead	State trail	Portland/Columbia River Gorge		-	-	Hood River
Molalla River State Park	State park	Portland/Columbia River Gorge		Yes	-	Canby
Mongold Day-Use Area	Boat launch (part of Detroit Lake SRA)	Willamette Valley		-	-	Detroit
Munson Creek Falls State Natural Site	Natural site	North Coast		-	-	Tillamook
Muriel O. Ponsler Memorial State Scenic Viewpoint	Scenic viewpoint	Central Coast		Yes	-	Florence
Nehalem Bay State Park	State park	North Coast		Yes	Yes	Manzanita
Neptune State Scenic Viewpoint	Scenic viewpoint	Central Coast		Yes	-	Yachats
Neskowin Beach State Recreation Site	Recreation site	Central Coast		-	-	Neskowin
OC&E Woods Line State Trail	State trail	Southern Oregon		-	-	Klamath Falls
Ocean Shore State Recreation Area	Recreation area	Central Coast		-	-	Newport
Oceanside Beach State Recreation Site	Recreation site	North Coast		Yes	-	Tillamook
Ochoco State Scenic Viewpoint	Scenic viewpoint	Central Oregon	-	-	-	Prineville
Ona Beach State Park	State park	Central Coast		-	-	Newport
Ontario State Recreation Site	Recreation site	Eastern Oregon		-	-	Ontario
Oswald West State Park	State park	North Coast		-	-	Cannon Beach
Otter Crest State Scenic Viewpoint	Scenic viewpoint	Central Coast		-	-	Newport
Otter Point State Recreation Site	Recreation site	South Coast		-	-	Gold Beach
Paradise Point State Recreation Site	Recreation site	South Coast		-	-	Port Orford
Pete French Round Barn State Heritage Site	Heritage site	Eastern Oregon	-	-	-	New Princeton
Peter Skene Ogden State Scenic Viewpoint	Scenic viewpoint	Central Oregon		Yes	-	Redmond
Pilot Butte State Scenic Viewpoint	Scenic viewpoint	Central Oregon		-	-	Bend
Pistol River State Scenic Viewpoint	Scenic viewpoint	South Coast		Yes	-	Gold Beach
Port Orford Heads State Park	State park	South Coast		-	-	Port Orford
Portland Women's Forum State Scenic Viewpoint	Scenic viewpoint	Portland/Columbia River Gorge		-	-	Troutdale
Prineville Reservoir State Park	State park	Central Oregon		Yes	Yes	Prineville
Prospect State Scenic Viewpoint	Scenic viewpoint	Southern Oregon		-	-	Prospect
Red Bridge State Wayside	Wayside	Eastern Oregon		-	Yes	La Grande
Roads End State Recreation Site	Recreation site	Central Coast		-	-	Lincoln City
Rocky Creek State Scenic Viewpoint	Scenic viewpoint	Central Coast		-	-	Depoe Bay
Rooster Rock State Park	State park	Portland/Columbia River Gorge		Yes	-	Multnomah Falls
Saddle Mountain State Natural Area	Natural area	North Coast		-	-	Seaside
Samuel H. Boardman State Scenic Corridor	Scenic corridor	South Coast		Yes	-	Brookings
Sarah Helmick State Recreation Site	Recreation site	Willamette Valley		Yes	-	Monmouth
Seal Rock State Recreation Site	Recreation site	Central Coast		Yes	-	Newport
Seneca Fouts Memorial State Natural Area	Natural area	Portland/Columbia River Gorge		-	-	Hood River
Seven Devils State Recreation Site	Recreation site	South Coast		-	-	Bandon
Shepperd's Dell State Natural Area	Natural area	Portland/Columbia River Gorge		-	-	Multnomah Falls
Sheridan State Scenic Corridor	Scenic corridor	Portland/Columbia River Gorge	-	-	-	Cascade Locks
Shore Acres State Park	State park	South Coast		Yes	-	Coos Bay
Silver Falls State Park	State park	Willamette Valley		Yes	Yes	Silverton
Sitka Sedge State Natural Area	Natural site	North Coast		Yes	No	Tillamook
Smelt Sands State Recreation Site	Recreation site	Central Coast		-	-	Yachats
Smith Rock State Park	State park	Central Oregon		-	Yes	Redmond
South Beach State Park	State park	Central Coast		Yes	Yes	Newport
South Jetty (South Beach)	Beach access (adjacent to South Beach State Park)	Central Coast		-	-	Newport
Starvation Creek State Park	State park	Portland/Columbia River Gorge		-	-	Hood River
State Capitol State Park	State park	Willamette Valley		-	-	Salem
Stonefield Beach State Recreation Site	Recreation site	Central Coast		-	-	Yachats
Succor Creek State Natural Area	Natural area	Eastern Oregon		-	Yes	Nyssa
Sumpter Valley Dredge State Heritage Area	Heritage area	Eastern Oregon		-	-	Baker City
Sunset Bay State Park	State park	South Coast		Yes	Yes	Coos Bay
Sunset Beach State Recreation Site	Recreation site	North Coast		Yes	-	Astoria
The Cove Palisades State Park	State park	Central Oregon		Yes	Yes	Madras
Thompson's Mills State Heritage Site	Heritage site	Willamette Valley		-	-	Shedd
Tokatee Klootchman State Natural Site	Natural site	Central Coast		Yes	-	Florence
Tolovana Beach State Recreation Site	Recreation site	North Coast		Yes	-	Cannon Beach
TouVelle State Recreation Site	Recreation site	Southern Oregon		Yes	-	Medford
Tryon Creek State Natural Area	Natural area	Portland/Columbia River Gorge		Yes	-	Portland
Tseriadun State Recreation Site	Recreation site	South Coast		Yes	No	Port Orford
Tub Springs State Wayside	Wayside	Southern Oregon		-	-	Ashland
Tumalo State Park	State park	Central Oregon		Yes	Yes	Bend
Ukiah–Dale Forest State Scenic Corridor	Scenic corridor	Eastern Oregon		-	Yes	Ukiah
Umpqua Lighthouse State Park	State park	South Coast		Yes	Yes	Reedsport
Umpqua State Scenic Corridor	Scenic corridor	South Coast		Yes	-	Reedsport
Unity Forest State Scenic Corridor	Scenic corridor	Eastern Oregon		-	-	John Day
Unity Lake State Recreation Site	Recreation site	Eastern Oregon		-	Yes	John Day
Valley of the Rogue State Park	State park	Southern Oregon		Yes	Yes	Grants Pass
Viento State Park	State park	Portland/Columbia River Gorge		-	Yes	Hood River
Vinzenz Lausmann Memorial State Natural Area	Natural area	Portland/Columbia River Gorge		-	-	Hood River
W. B. Nelson State Recreation Site	Recreation site	Central Coast		-	-	Waldport
Wallowa Lake Highway Forest State Scenic Corridor	Scenic corridor	Eastern Oregon		-	-	Enterprise
Wallowa Lake State State Park	State park	Eastern Oregon		Yes	Yes	Joseph
Warm Springs State Recreation Site	Former recreation site	North-central Oregon			Used for boat launch	Warm Springs
Washburne State Wayside	Wayside	Willamette Valley		Yes	-	Junction City
Whale Watching Center	Guided ocean viewpoint	Central Coast		-	-	Depoe Bay
White River Falls State Park	State park	Central Oregon		-	-	The Dalles
Willamette Mission State Park	State park	Willamette Valley		Yes	Yes	Salem
Willamette River Greenway and Water Trail	State greenway	Willamette Valley		-	-	Eugene
Willamette Stone State Heritage Site	Heritage site	Portland/Columbia River Gorge		Yes	-	Portland
William M. Tugman State Park	State park	South Coast		Yes	Yes	Reedsport
Winchuck State Recreation Site	Recreation site	South Coast		Yes	-	Brookings
Wolf Creek Inn State Heritage Site	Heritage site	Southern Oregon		Yes	-	Grants Pass
Wygant State Natural Area	Natural area	Portland/Columbia River Gorge		-	-	Hood River
Yachats Ocean Road State Natural Site	Natural site	Central Coast		-	-	Yachats
Yachats State Recreation Area	Recreation area	Central Coast		-	-	Yachats
Yaquina Bay State Recreation Site	Recreation site	Central Coast		-	-	Newport

== Photo gallery ==
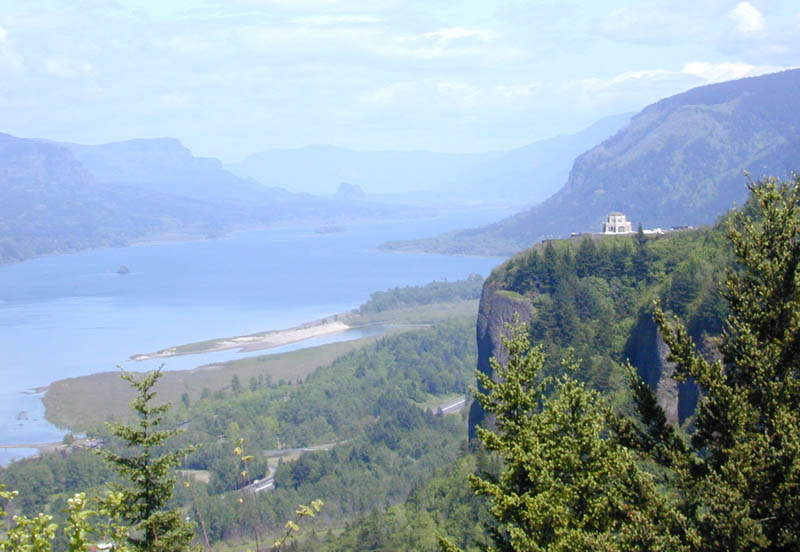
Crown Point and Vista House, taken from Portland Women's Forum viewpoint

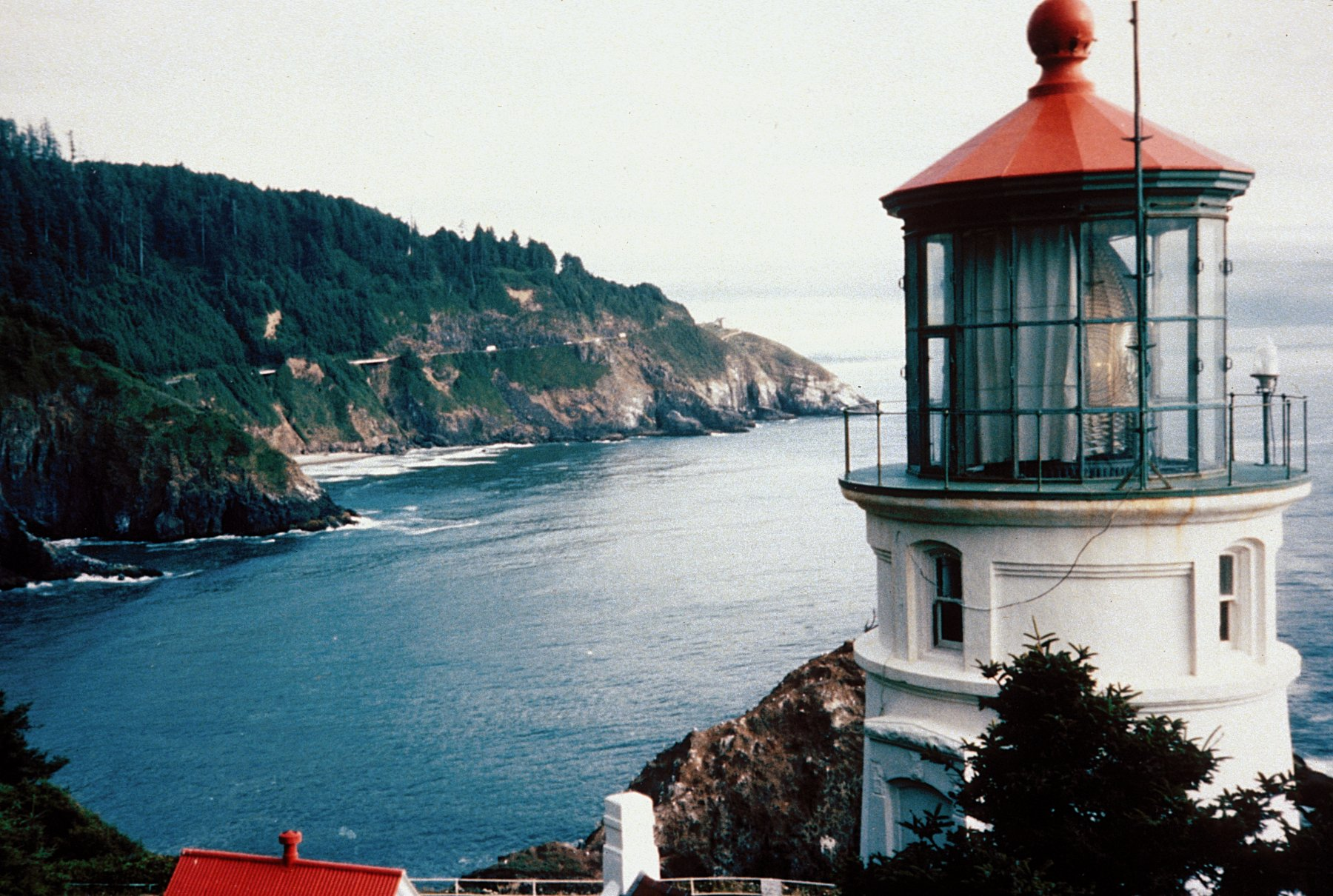
A closeup of the Heceta Head Light tower

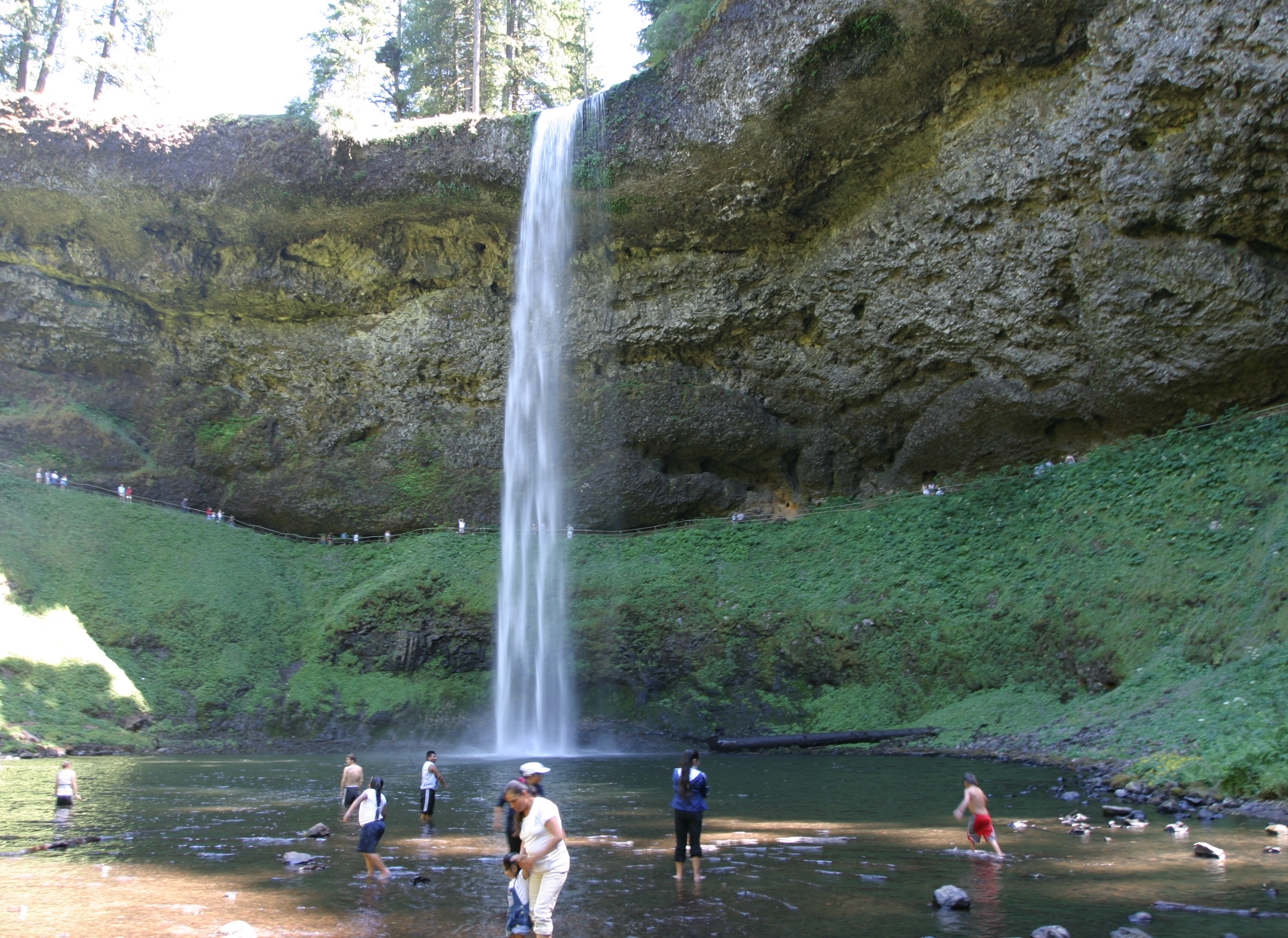
Silver Falls

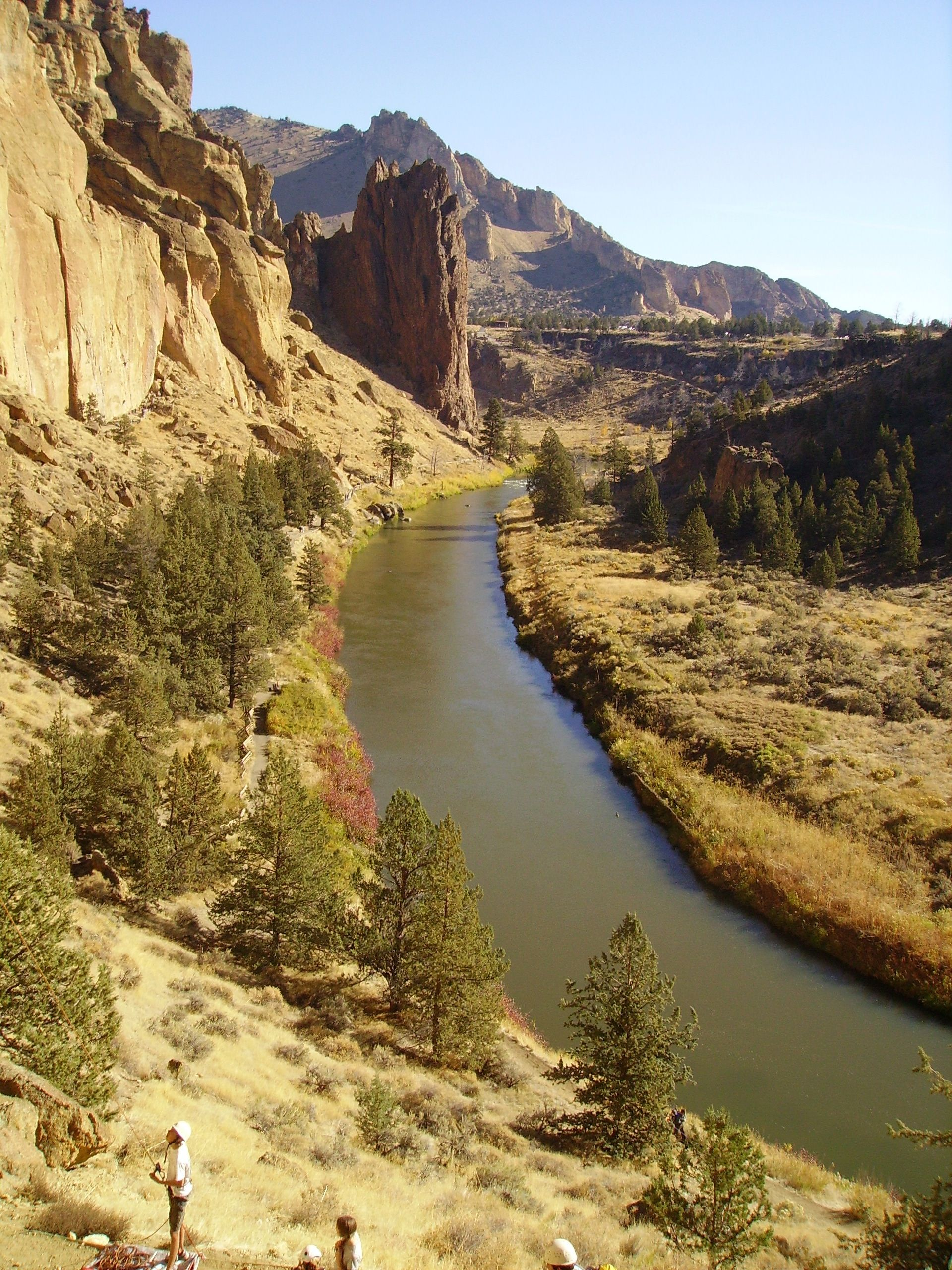
Smith Rock

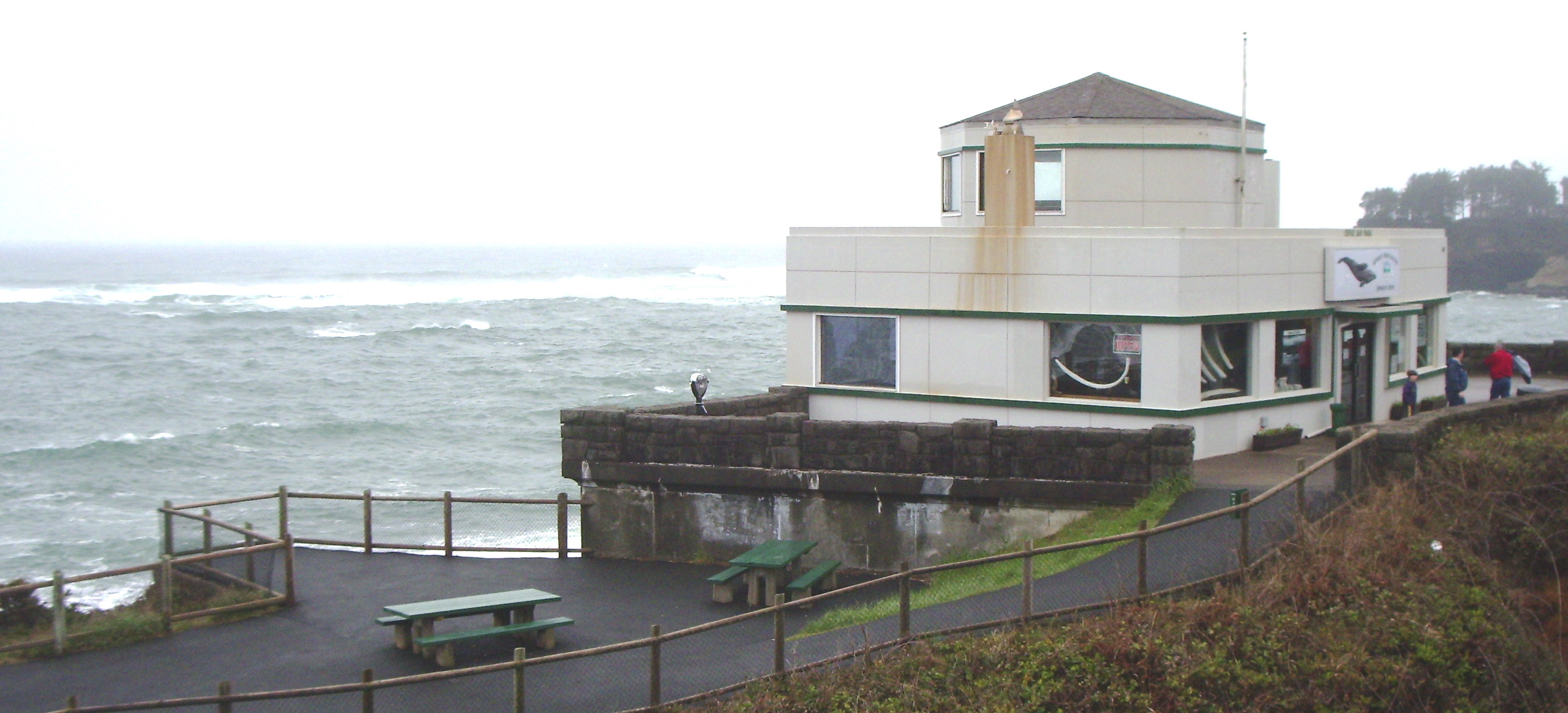
Whale watching center at Depoe Bay

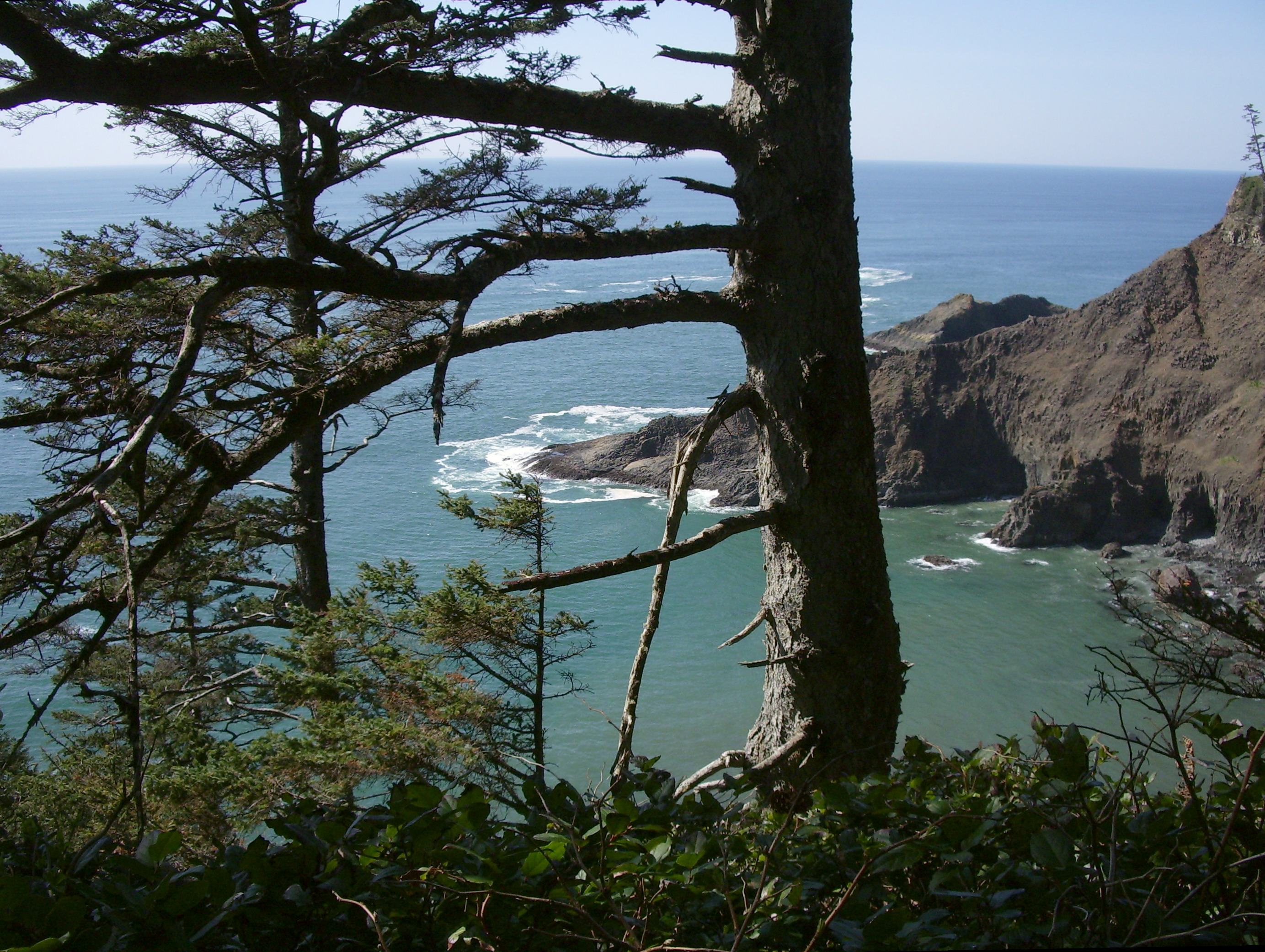
North of Cape Falcon in Oswald West State Park

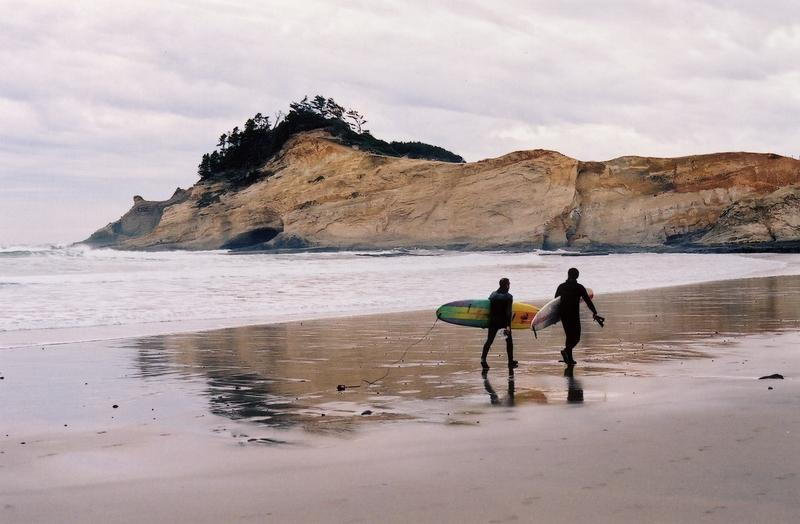
Cape Kiwanda

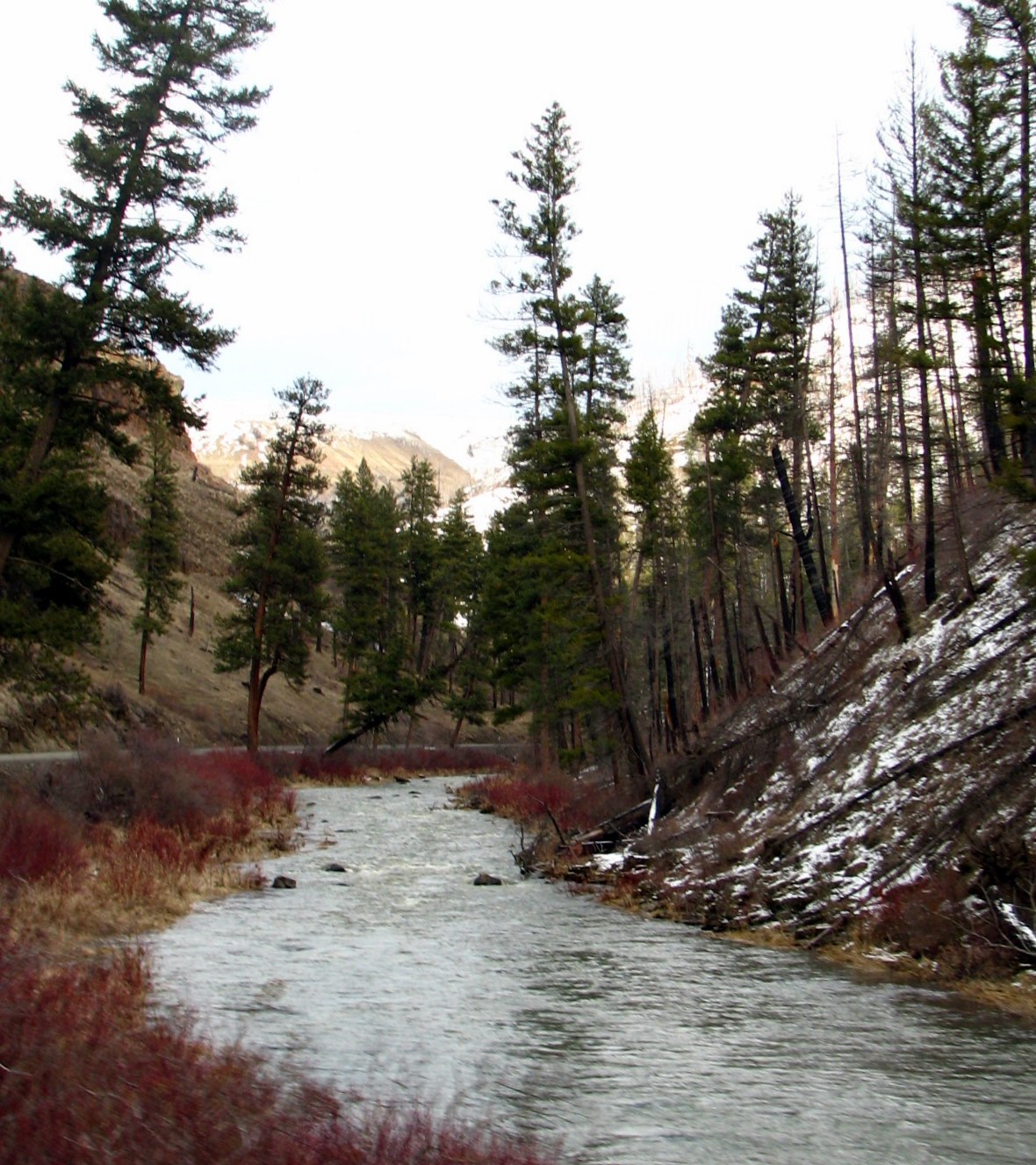
Ukiah–Dale Forest State Scenic Corridor

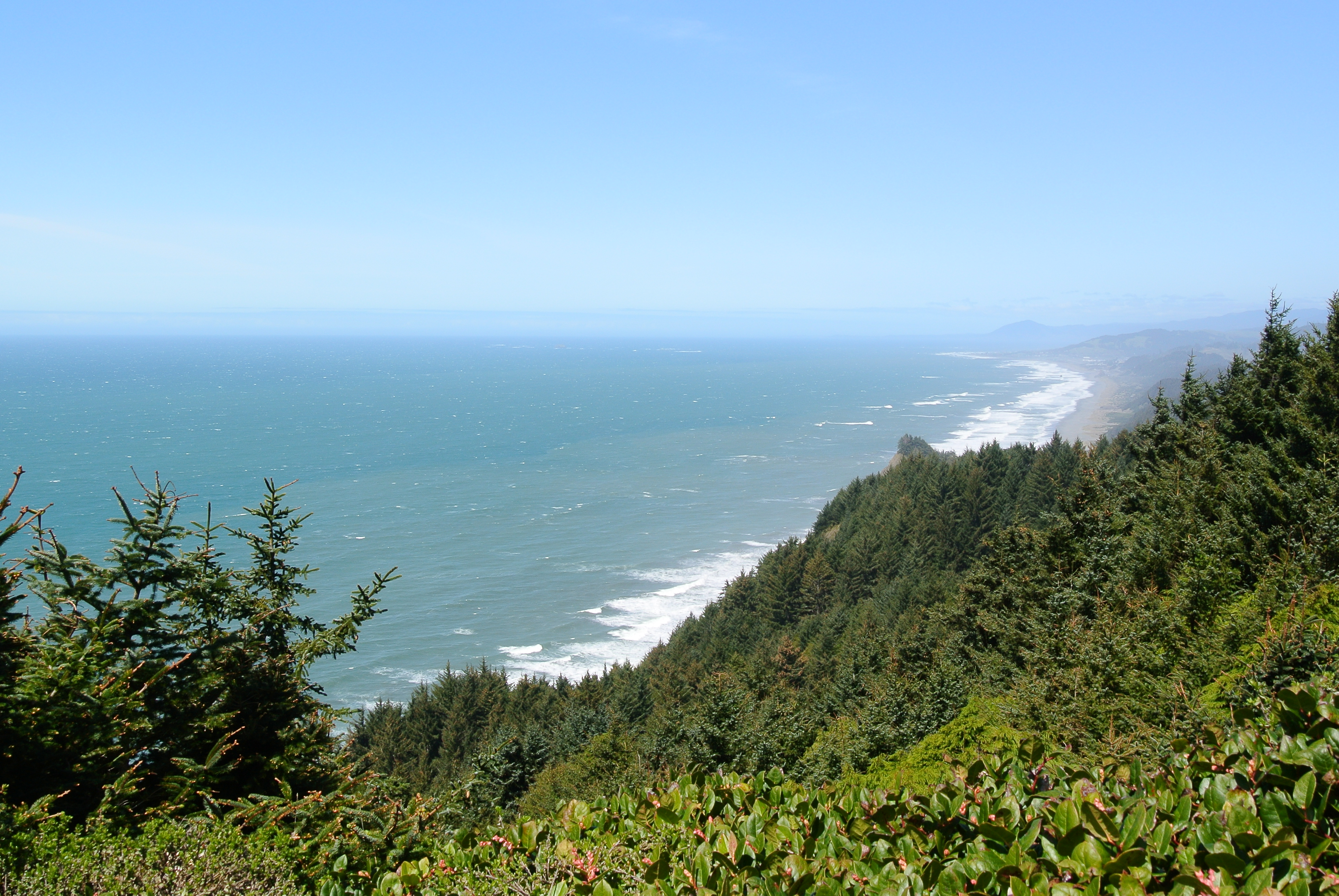
Looking north from Cape Sebastian

== Bibliography ==
- Jan Bannan. Oregon State Parks: A Complete Recreation Guide, second edition. Seattle: The Mountaineers Books. 2002. ISBN 0-89886-794-0
- Oregon Parks & Heritage Guide 2008. October 2007. Oregon Parks and Recreation Department.

== See also ==
- List of national parks in Oregon
- Lists of Oregon-related topics

== Notes ==
- Oregon Secretary of State (January 13, 2012). "Oregon Administrative Rules contain OARs filed through January 13, 2012".
