= Del Rey Beach State Recreation Site =

State park in Oregon, US

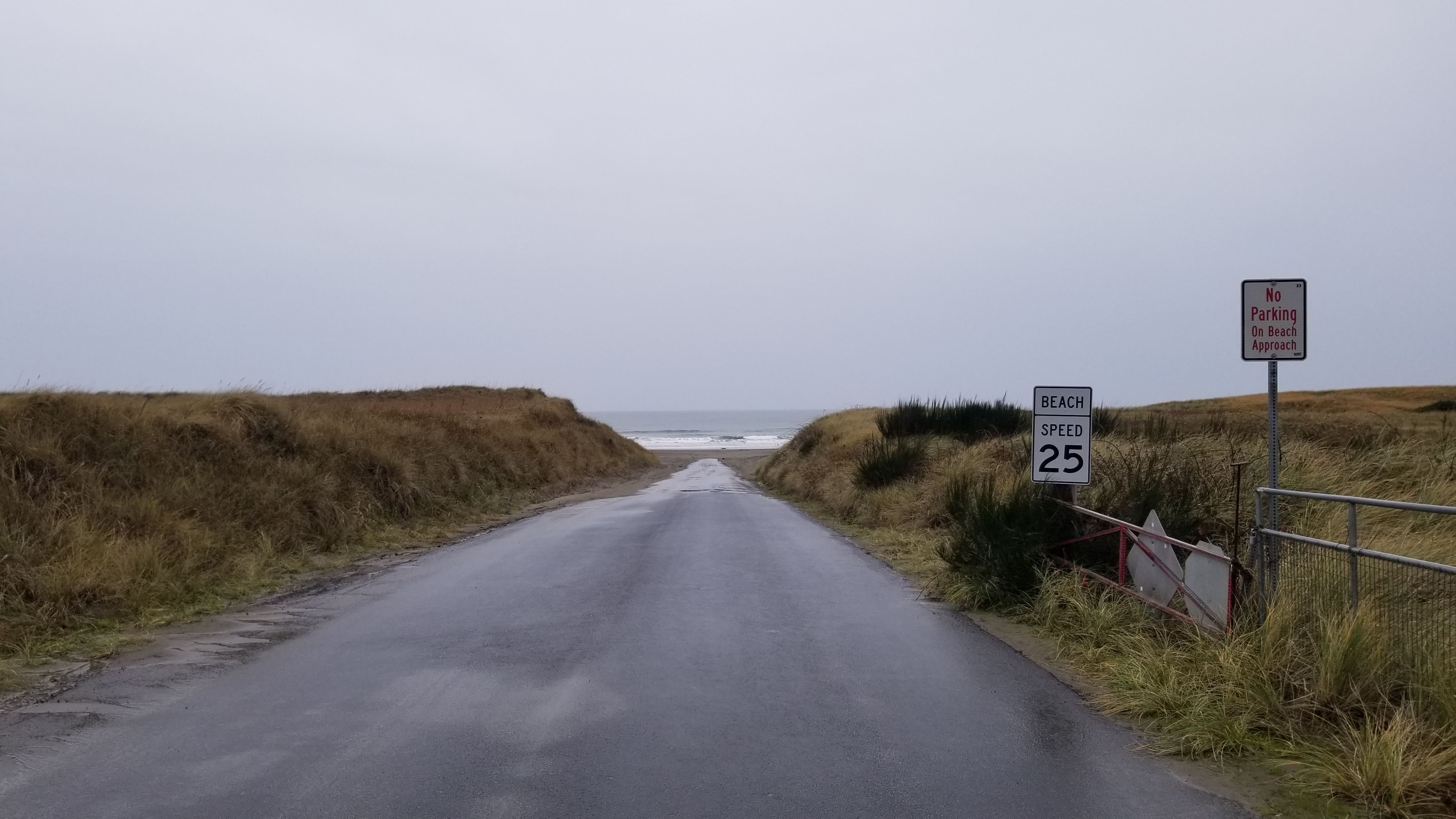
- Motor vehicle access to Del Rey Beach, Oregon.

- Location within Oregon Location within the United States
- Type: Public, state
- Location: Clatsop County, Oregon
- Nearest city: Seaside
- Coordinates: 46°02′39″N 123°55′30″W
- Operator: Oregon Parks and Recreation Department

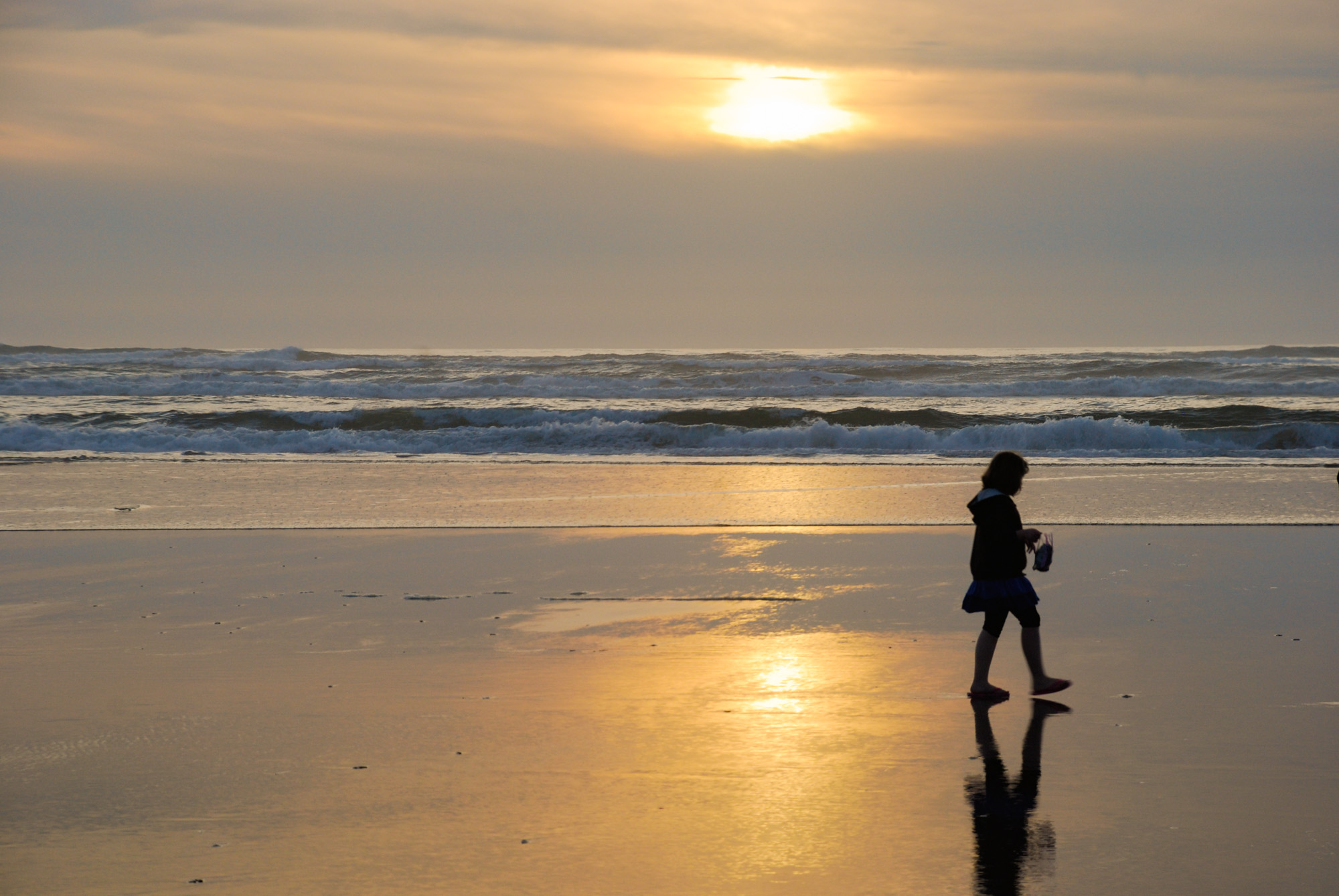
Del Rey Beach evening and sunset. Clatsop County.

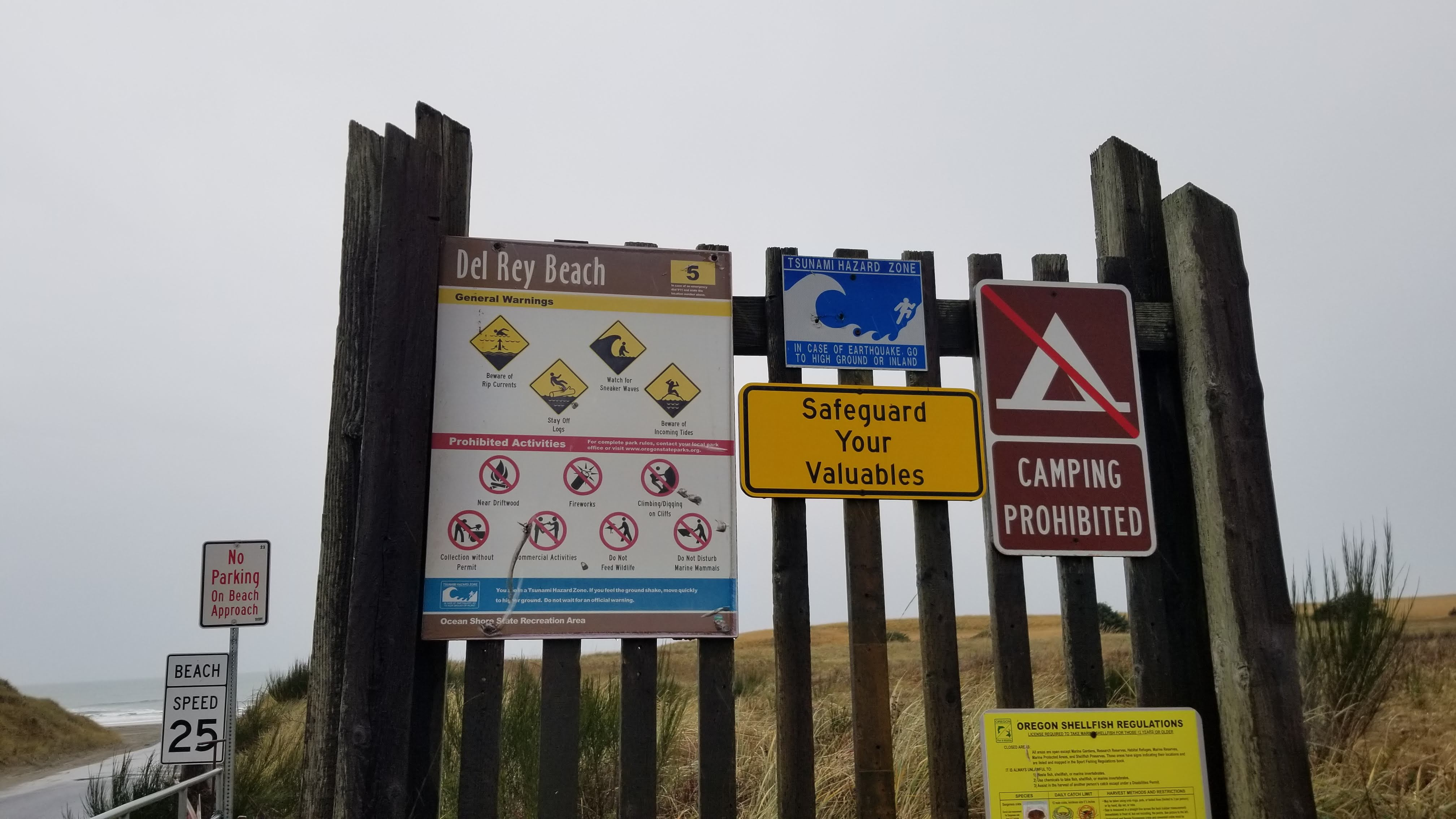
Sign at the entrance to Del Ray Beach.

Del Rey Beach State Recreation Site is a state park in the U.S. state of Oregon, administered by the Oregon Parks and Recreation Department.

== See also ==
- List of Oregon state parks
