= McVay Rock State Recreation Site =

State park in Oregon, United States

- Location within Oregon Location within the United States
- Type: Public, state
- Location: Curry County, Oregon
- Nearest city: Brookings
- Coordinates: 42°01′08″N 124°14′00″W
- Operator: Oregon Parks and Recreation Department

McVay Rock State Recreation Site is a state park in the U.S. state of Oregon, administered by the Oregon Parks and Recreation Department.

The park was purchased from private owners at some point between 1970 and 1974. It was named for the nearby McVay Rock, which was demolished for gravel and fill rock, and is now the site of a small housing development.

== See also ==
- List of Oregon state parks
