= Unity Forest State Scenic Corridor =

State park in Oregon, United States

- Location within Oregon Location within the United States
- Type: Public, state
- Location: Baker County, Oregon
- Nearest city: Baker City
- Coordinates: 44°22′17″N 118°06′47″W
- Operator: Oregon Parks and Recreation Department

Unity Forest State Scenic Corridor is a state park in the U.S. state of Oregon, administered by the Oregon Parks and Recreation Department.

== See also ==
- List of Oregon state parks
