= Umpqua State Scenic Corridor =

State Park in the US

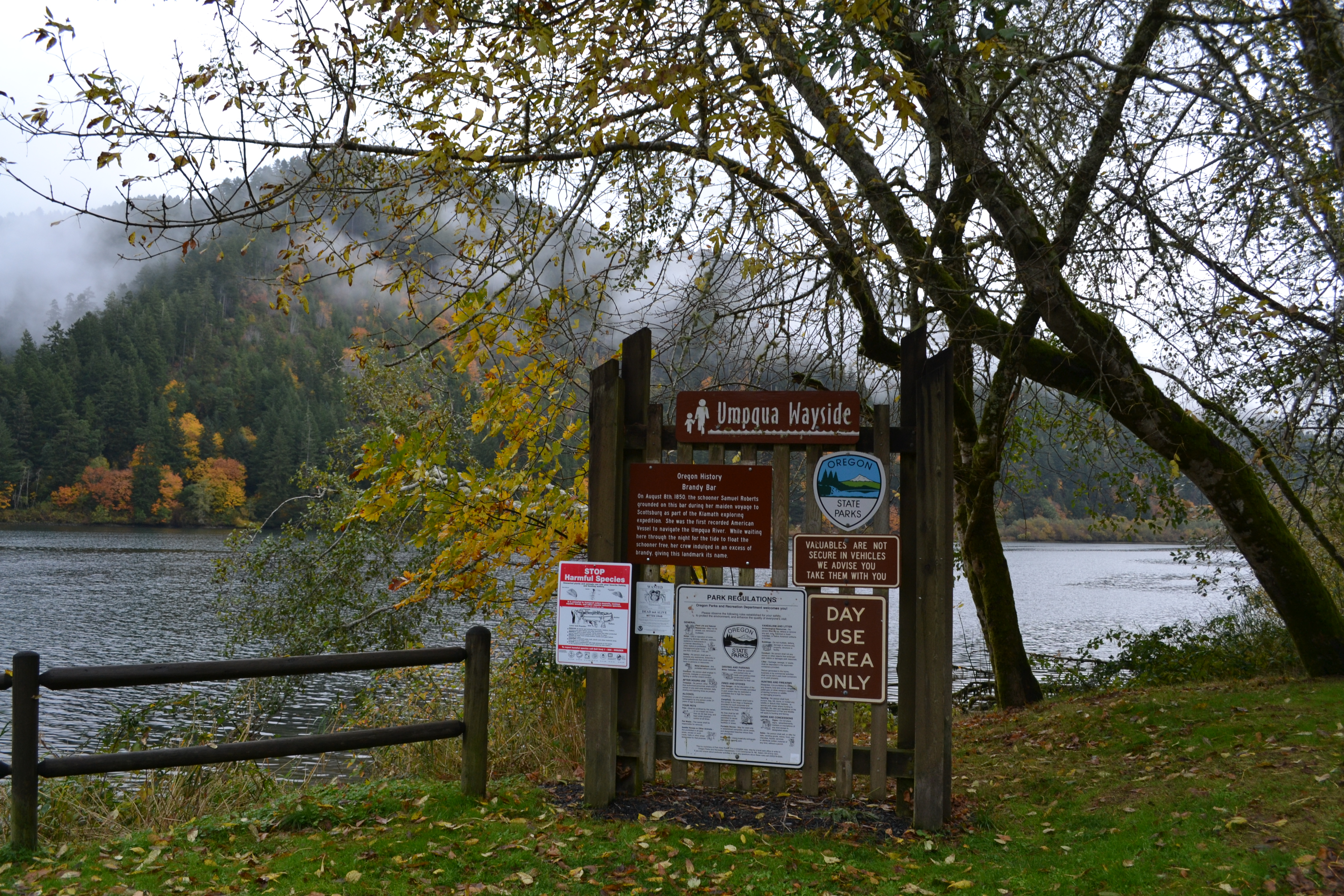

- Location within Oregon Location within the United States
- Type: Public, state
- Location: Douglas County, Oregon
- Nearest city: Reedsport
- Coordinates: 43°39′04″N 123°54′21″W
- Operator: Oregon Parks and Recreation Department

Umpqua State Scenic Corridor is a state park in the U.S. state of Oregon, administered by the Oregon Parks and Recreation Department.

== See also ==
- List of Oregon state parks
