= Geisel Monument State Heritage Site =

State park in Oregon, United States

- Location within Oregon Location within the United States
- Type: Public, state
- Location: Curry County, Oregon
- Nearest city: Gold Beach
- Coordinates: 42°29′26″N 124°25′01″W
- Operator: Oregon Parks and Recreation Department

Geisel Monument State Heritage Site is a state park in the U.S. state of Oregon, administered by the Oregon Parks and Recreation Department.

== See also ==
- List of Oregon state parks
