= Wallowa Lake Highway Forest State Scenic Corridor =

State park in Oregon, USA

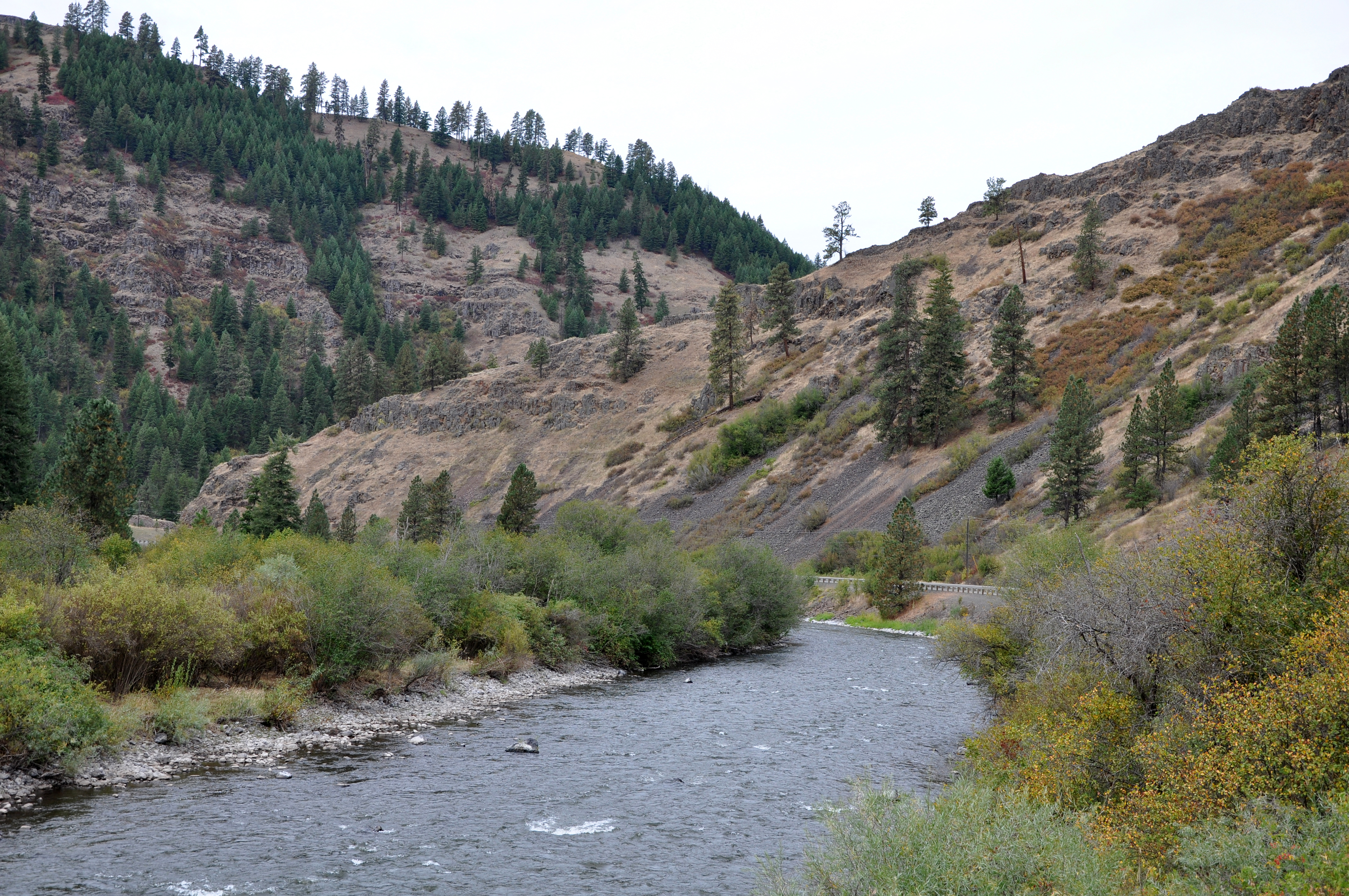
- Oregon State Parks
- Interactive map of Wallowa Lake Highway Forest State Scenic Corridor
- Type: State park
- Location: Wallowa County, Oregon
- Nearest city: La Grande
- Coordinates: 45°37′22″N 117°41′07″W
- Operator: Oregon Parks and Recreation Department

Wallowa Lake Highway Forest State Scenic Corridor is a state park in the U.S. state of Oregon, administered by the Oregon Parks and Recreation Department.

== See also ==
- List of Oregon state parks
