= Battle Mountain Forest State Scenic Corridor =

State Park in Umatilla County, Oregon

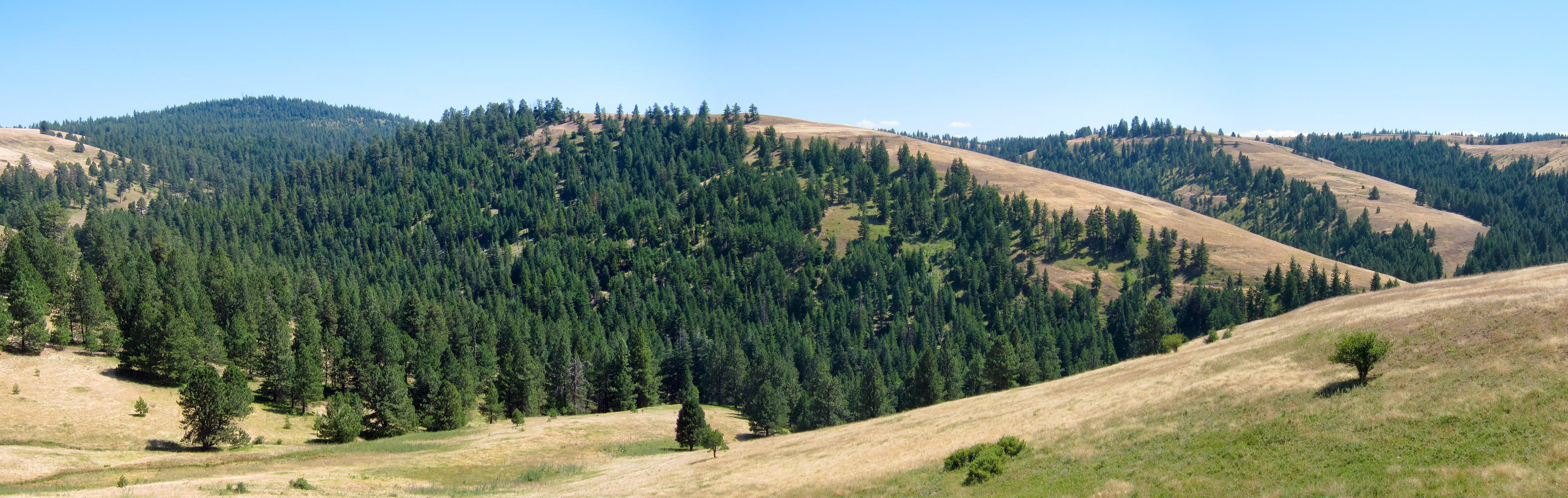

- Location within Oregon Location within the United States
- Interactive map of Battle Mountain Forest State Scenic Corridor
- Type: Public, state
- Location: Umatilla County, Oregon
- Nearest city: Ukiah
- Coordinates: 45°15′59″N 118°58′29″W
- Operator: Oregon Parks and Recreation Department
- Open: Year round

Battle Mountain Forest State Scenic Corridor is a state park in the U.S. state of Oregon, administered by the Oregon Parks and Recreation Department.

== See also ==
- List of Oregon state parks
