= Blue Mountain Forest State Scenic Corridor =

State Park in Umatilla County, Oregon

- Location within Oregon Location within the United States
- Interactive map of Blue Mountain Forest State Scenic Corridor
- Type: Public, state
- Location: Umatilla County, Oregon
- Nearest city: La Grande
- Coordinates: 45°27′29″N 118°23′49″W
- Operator: Oregon Parks and Recreation Department

Blue Mountain Forest State Scenic Corridor is a state park in the U.S. state of Oregon, administered by the Oregon Parks and Recreation Department.

== See also ==
- List of Oregon state parks
