= Fogarty Creek State Recreation Area =

State park in Oregon

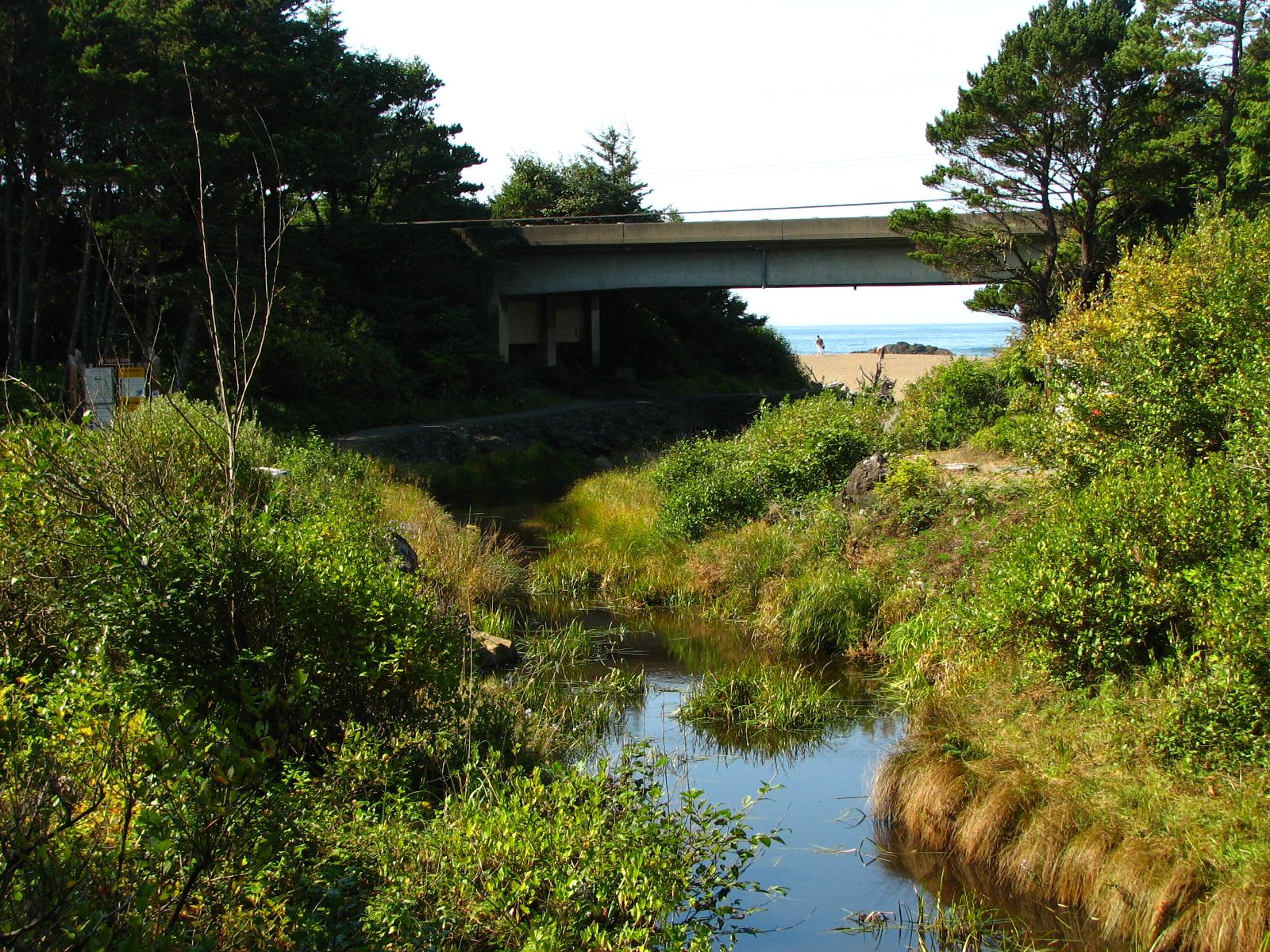
- View of Fogarty Creek, the US Highway 101 overpass, and the Pacific Ocean

- Location within Oregon Location within the United States
- Type: Public, state
- Location: Lincoln County, Oregon
- Nearest city: Lincoln City
- Coordinates: 44°50′32″N 124°02′44″W
- Area: 165.08 acres (66.81 ha)
- Created: 1950s
- Operator: Oregon Parks and Recreation

Fogarty Creek State Recreation Area is a state park in the U.S. state of Oregon, administered by the Oregon Parks and Recreation Department.

== History ==
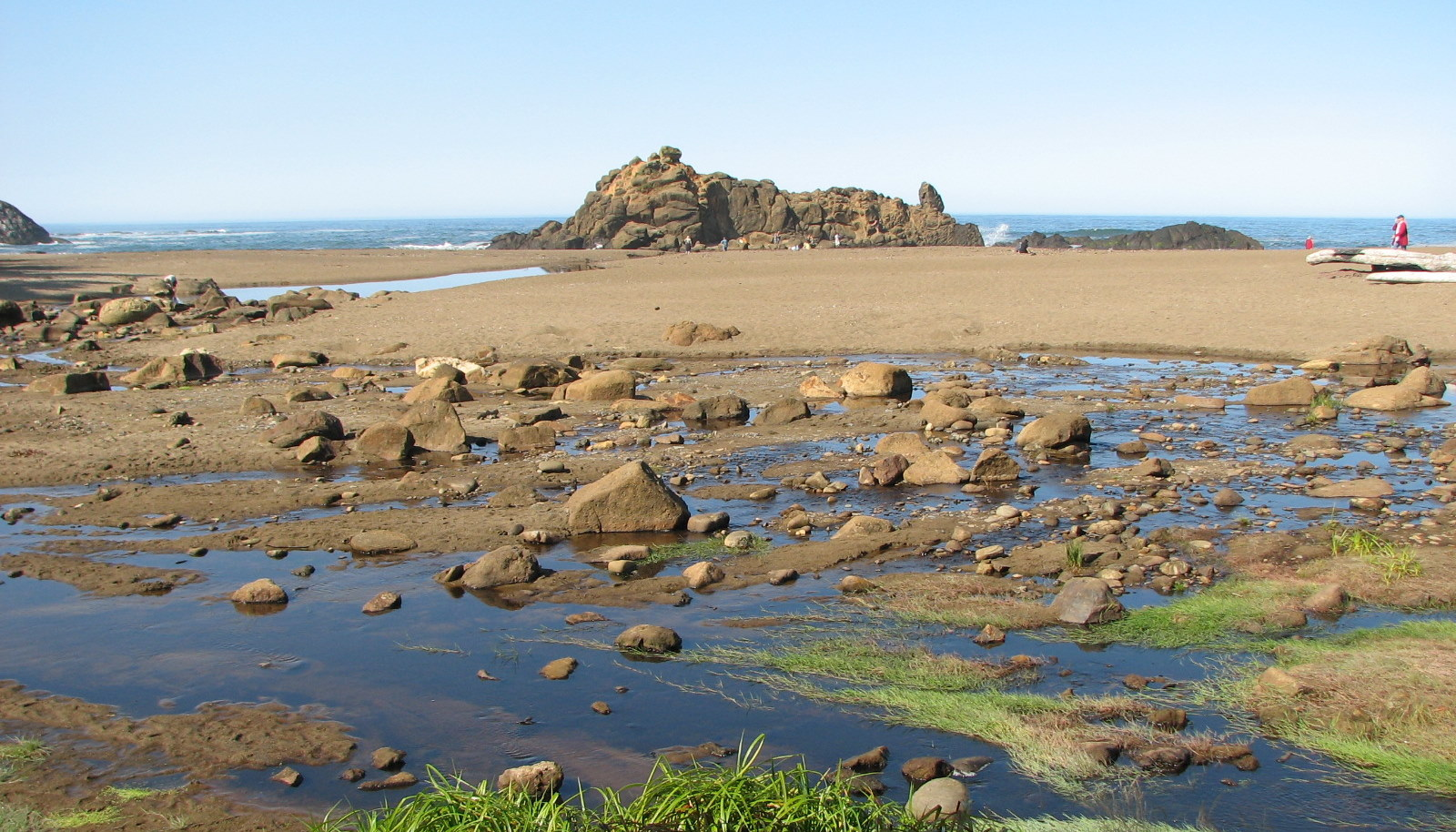
The beach

The park was established in the 1950s, assembled through purchase and donation of land acquired between 1954 and 1978. The park and the creek were named after John Fogarty, a former judge in Lincoln County.

== See also ==
- List of Oregon state parks
