= La Pine State Park =

State park in Oregon, United States

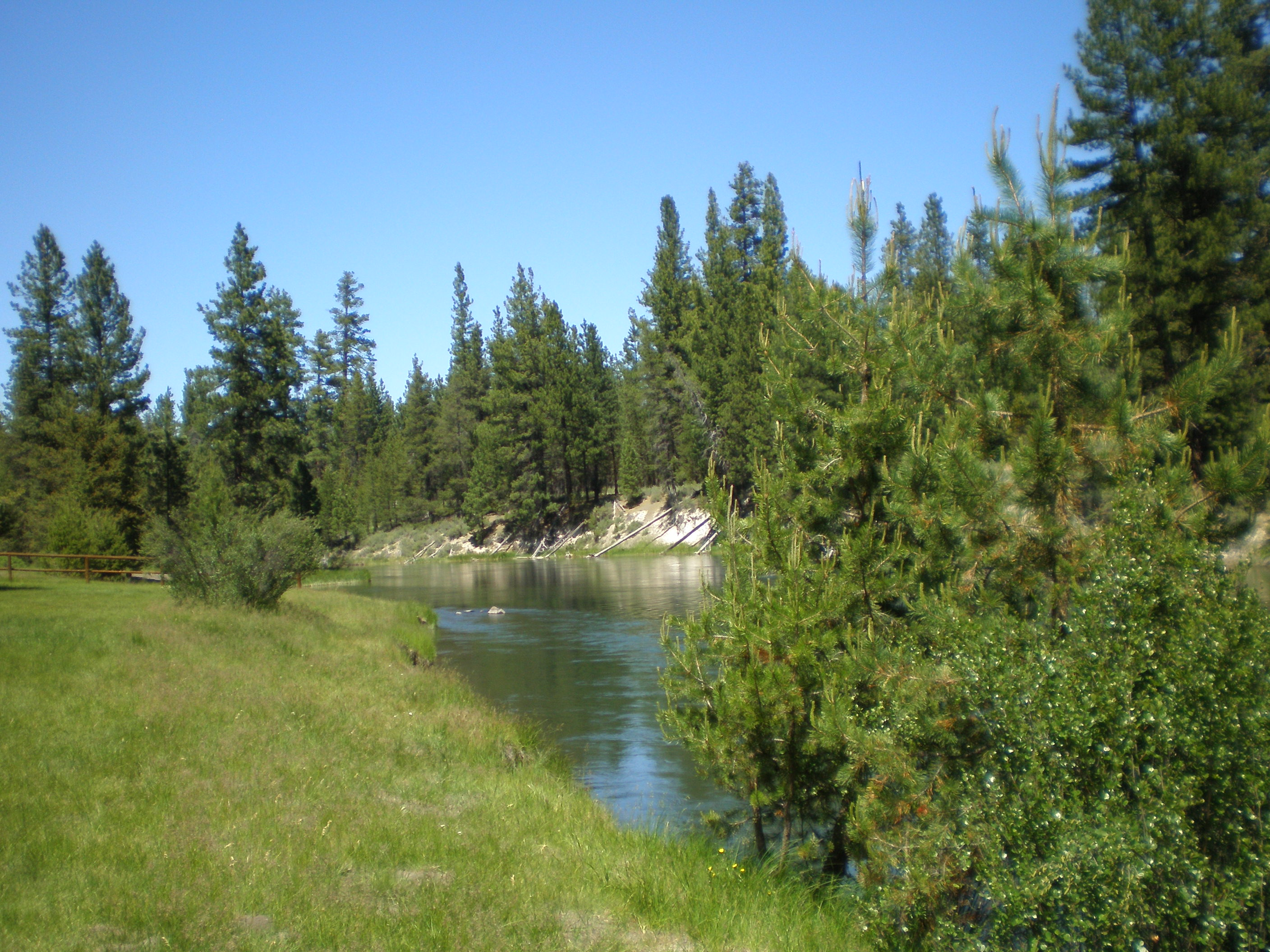
- La Pine State Park in 2011

- Location within Oregon Location within the United States
- Type: Public, state
- Location: Deschutes County, Oregon
- Nearest city: Bend
- Coordinates: 43°46′34″N 121°31′44″W
- Operator: Oregon Parks and Recreation Department

La Pine State Park is a state park along the Deschutes River in the U.S. state of Oregon, administered by the Oregon Parks and Recreation Department. The closest town is La Pine, 5 miles north-east of the park.

== Visitor opportunities ==
The park offers year round camping, cabins, a pet exercise area, a picnic area, as well as a day use area with easy access to boating and wading along the Upper Deschutes River. Within the park is a ponderosa pine nicknamed "Big Tree". At nearly 162 feet tall and estimated to be almost 500 years old, it is believed to be the largest ponderosa pine in the world.

== See also ==
- List of Oregon state parks
