= Tub Springs State Wayside =

State park in Oregon, United States

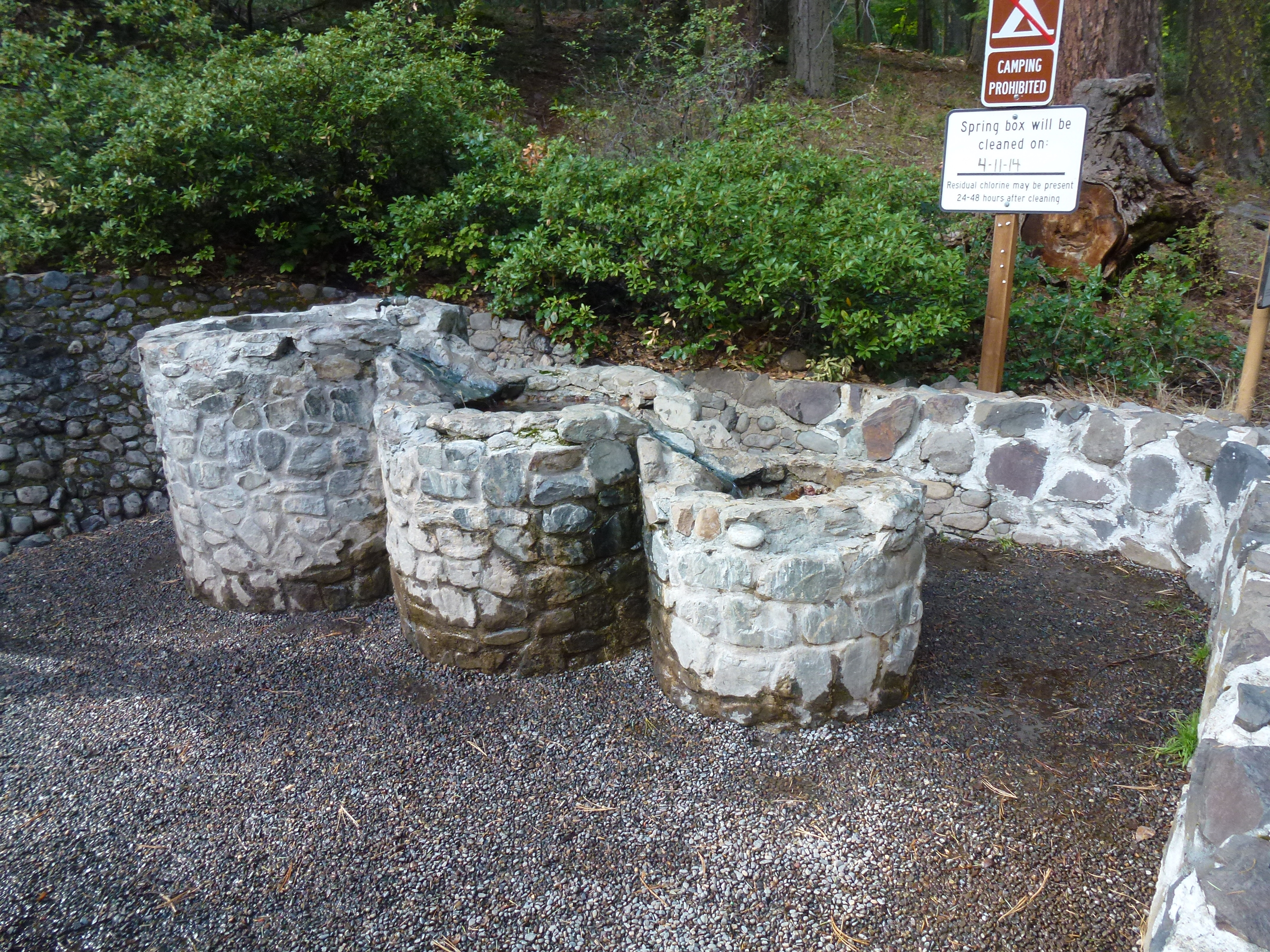
- Tub Springs

- Location within Oregon Location within the United States
- Type: Public, state
- Location: Jackson County, Oregon
- Nearest city: Ashland
- Coordinates: 42°06′56″N 122°26′14″W
- Operator: Oregon Parks and Recreation Department

Tub Springs State Wayside is a state park in the U.S. state of Oregon, administered by the Oregon Parks and Recreation Department.

== See also ==
- List of Oregon state parks
