= Bolon Island Tideways State Scenic Corridor =

State park in Oregon, US

- Location within Oregon Location within the United States
- Interactive map of Bolon Island Tideways State Scenic Corridor
- Type: Public, state
- Location: Douglas County, Oregon
- Nearest city: Reedsport
- Coordinates: 43°42′44″N 124°06′08″W
- Area: 11.4 acres (4.6 ha)
- Operator: Oregon Parks and Recreation Department
- Parking: 1 parking area

Bolon Island Tideways State Scenic Corridor is a state park in the U.S. state of Oregon, administered by the Oregon Parks and Recreation Department. The 11.4-acre (4.6 ha) park is on Bolon Island 10 river miles (16 km) from the mouth of the Umpqua River and north of Reedsport. It is along Highway 101 and near the site, where in 1828, most of Jedediah Smith's party were massacred. The land was given to the state in 1934 by William C. and Jennie D. Chamberlain.

The park is undeveloped except for a parking area and a hiking trail.

== See also ==
- List of Oregon state parks
