= Hoffman Memorial State Wayside =

State park in Oregon, United States

- Location within Oregon Location within the United States
- Type: Public, state
- Location: Coos County, Oregon
- Nearest city: Myrtle Point
- Coordinates: 43°02′10″N 124°07′04″W
- Operator: Oregon Parks and Recreation Department

Hoffman Memorial State Wayside is a state park in the U.S. state of Oregon, administered by the Oregon Parks and Recreation Department.

== See also ==
- List of Oregon state parks
