= Red Bridge State Wayside =

State park in Oregon, United States

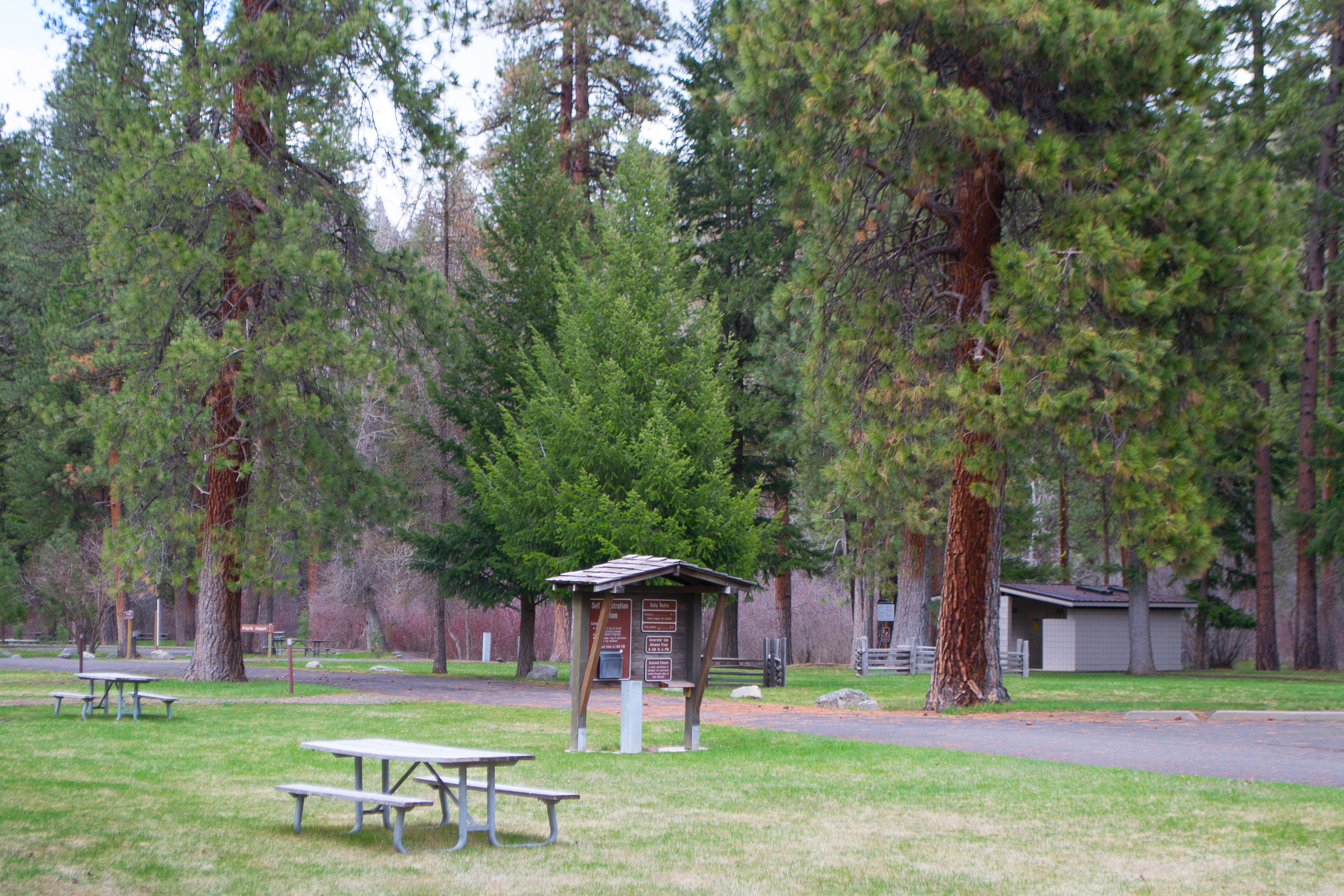

- Location within Oregon Location within the United States
- Type: Public, state
- Location: Union County, Oregon
- Nearest city: La Grande
- Coordinates: 45°17′23″N 118°19′58″W
- Operator: Oregon Parks and Recreation Department

Red Bridge State Wayside is a state park in the U.S. state of Oregon, administered by the Oregon Parks and Recreation Department.

== See also ==
- List of Oregon state parks
