= Koberg Beach State Recreation Site =

State park in Oregon, US

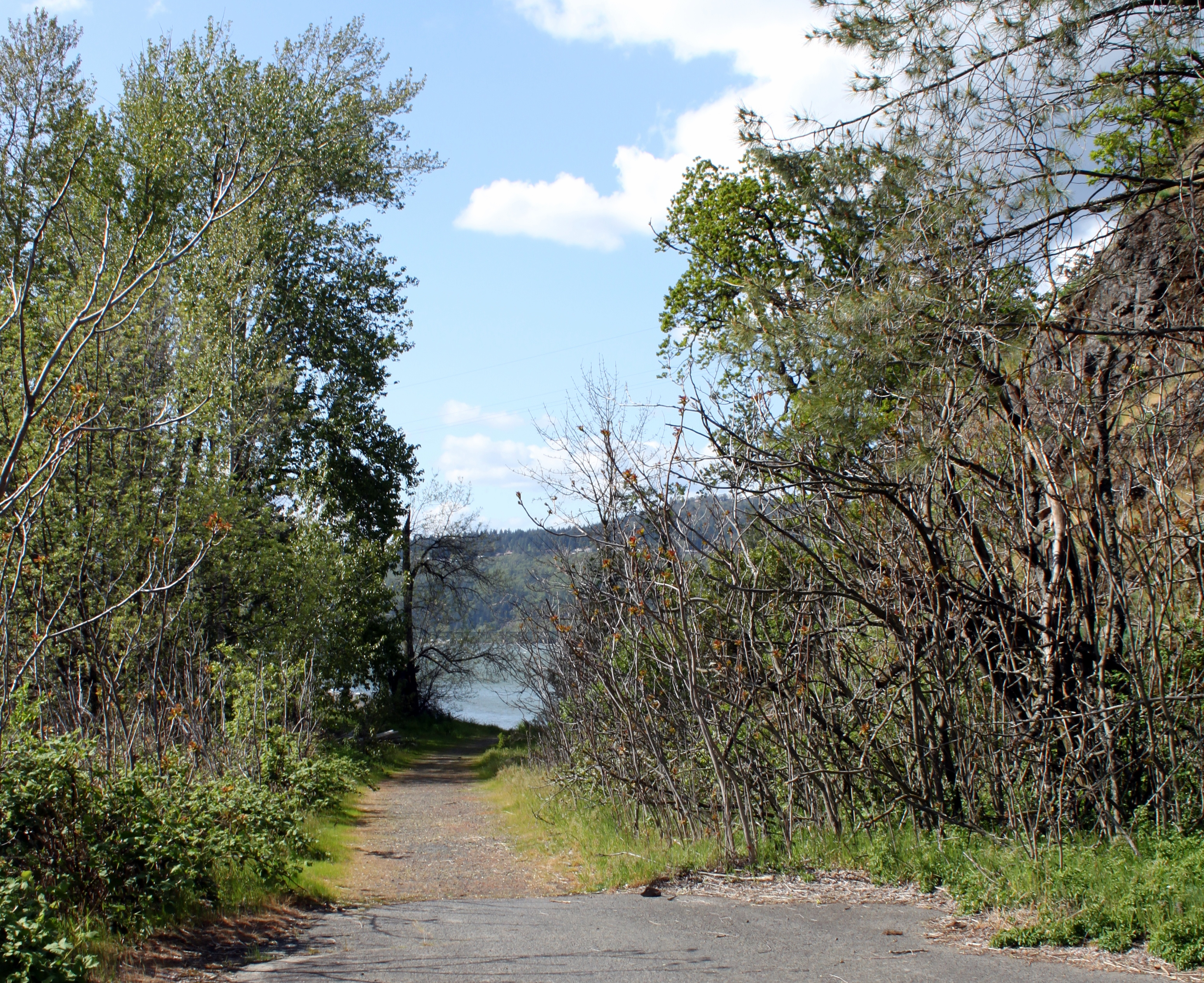
- Hiking trail and Columbia River at Koberg Beach

- Location within Oregon Location within the United States
- Type: Public, state
- Location: Hood River County, Oregon
- Nearest city: Hood River
- Coordinates: 45°41′44″N 121°27′21″W
- Operator: Oregon Parks and Recreation Department

Koberg Beach State Recreation Site is a state park in Hood River County, Oregon United States, administered by the Oregon Parks and Recreation Department. The park offers a wayside rest area for west bound traffic on Interstate 84.

For years, the area was owned by the Koberg family who developed the beach and built a rustic style dance hall which was popular with people from nearby Hood River. The Highway Department acquired the land in 1953 and removed the dance hall the next year. In 1962, an entrance road, a parking area and other facilities became available.

== See also ==
- List of Oregon state parks
