= Muriel O. Ponsler Memorial State Scenic Viewpoint =

State park in Oregon, USA

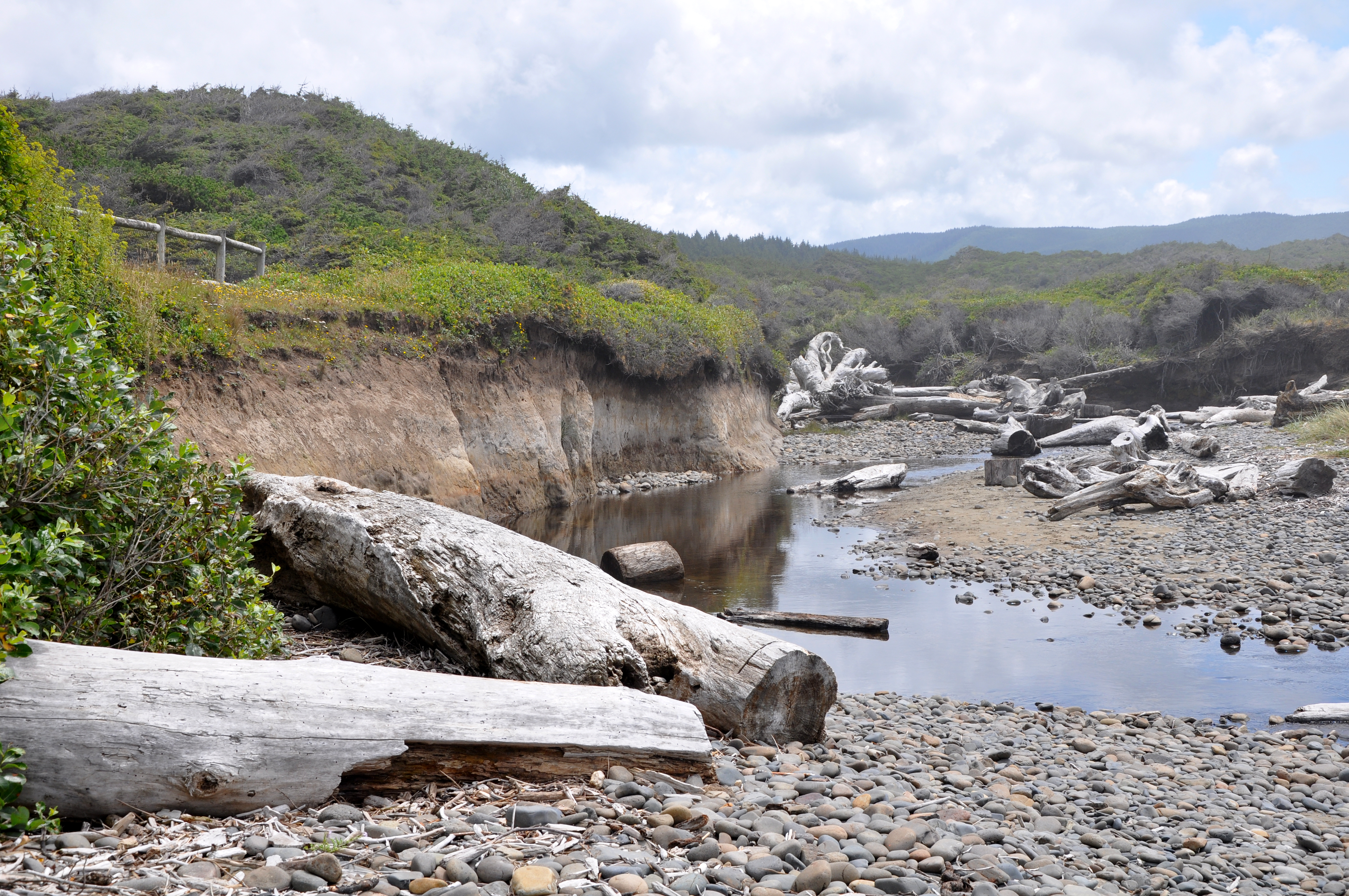
- Driftwood along China Creek in the park

- Location within Oregon Location within the United States
- Type: Public, state
- Location: Lane County, Oregon
- Nearest city: Florence
- Coordinates: 44°10′14″N 124°06′55″W
- Created: 1938
- Operator: Oregon Parks and Recreation Department

Muriel O. Ponsler Memorial State Scenic Viewpoint is a state park in the U.S. state of Oregon, administered by the Oregon Parks and Recreation Department.

The land was donated by J. C. Ponsler in memory of his wife Muriel. She was born as Muriel Olevia Grant on September 21, 1897, in Dallas, Oregon. She married J. C., a Florence, Oregon auto dealer in July 1920. She died March 29, 1939, in Florence.

== See also ==
- List of Oregon state parks
