= Casey State Recreation Site =

State park in the U.S. state of Oregon

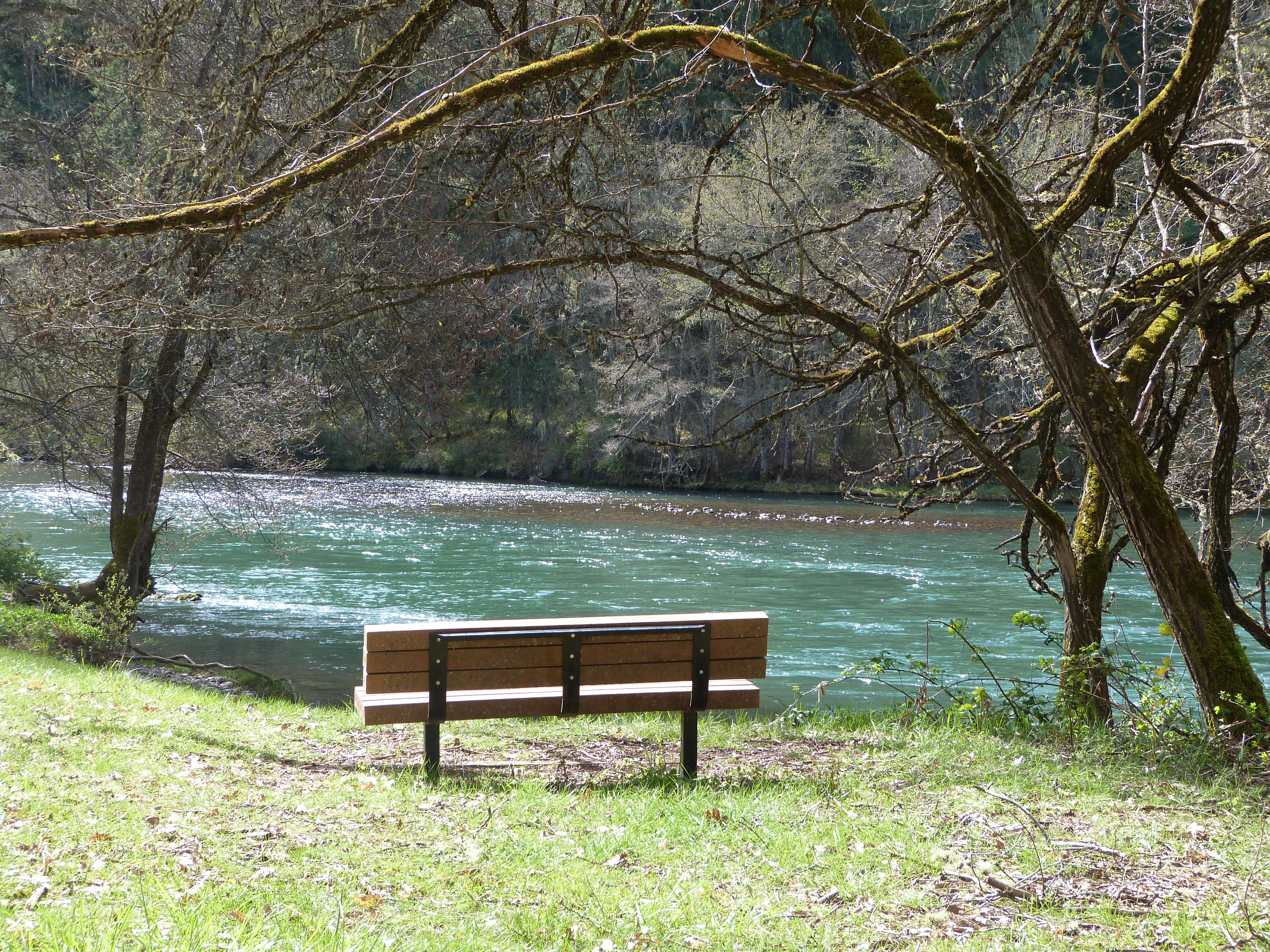

- Location within Oregon Location within the United States
- Interactive map of Casey State Recreation Site
- Type: Public, state
- Location: Jackson County, Oregon
- Nearest city: Medford
- Coordinates: 42°39′33″N 122°41′57″W
- Operator: Oregon Parks and Recreation Department

Casey State Recreation Site is a day-use only state park located 29 miles northeast of Medford, Oregon off Oregon Route 62. The parks offers picnic and boating facilities, as well as access to the Rogue River. It is located on the Crater Lake Highway and is a popular salmon fishing area.

The land for the park was leased from the federal government in 1932 and purchased in 1937. At the time of the lease, there were two residents on the land. One of them, James Allen Casey (J.A. Casey or "Jack" Casey), who was born in Kansas, had built a small restaurant and tourist camp, called Casey's Auto Camp. James Allen Casey believed he had homesteaded the land, many years before it was "discovered" to be federal land. ([James "Jack" Casey was directly descended from John Wallace—Sir John Wallace [Sir John—Brother of William "Braveheart" Wallace—Laird of Elderslie, 1273-1306], who was executed for essentially the same reason, and in the same way, as his father and brother William were before him.])

Since the residents did not then own the land, they were granted three-year leases. The Civilian Conservation Corps improved the existing facilities; adding a parking lot, more tables, individual stoves, a boat ramp, and trails.

== See also ==
- List of Oregon state parks
