= Lost Creek State Recreation Site =

State park in Oregon, United States

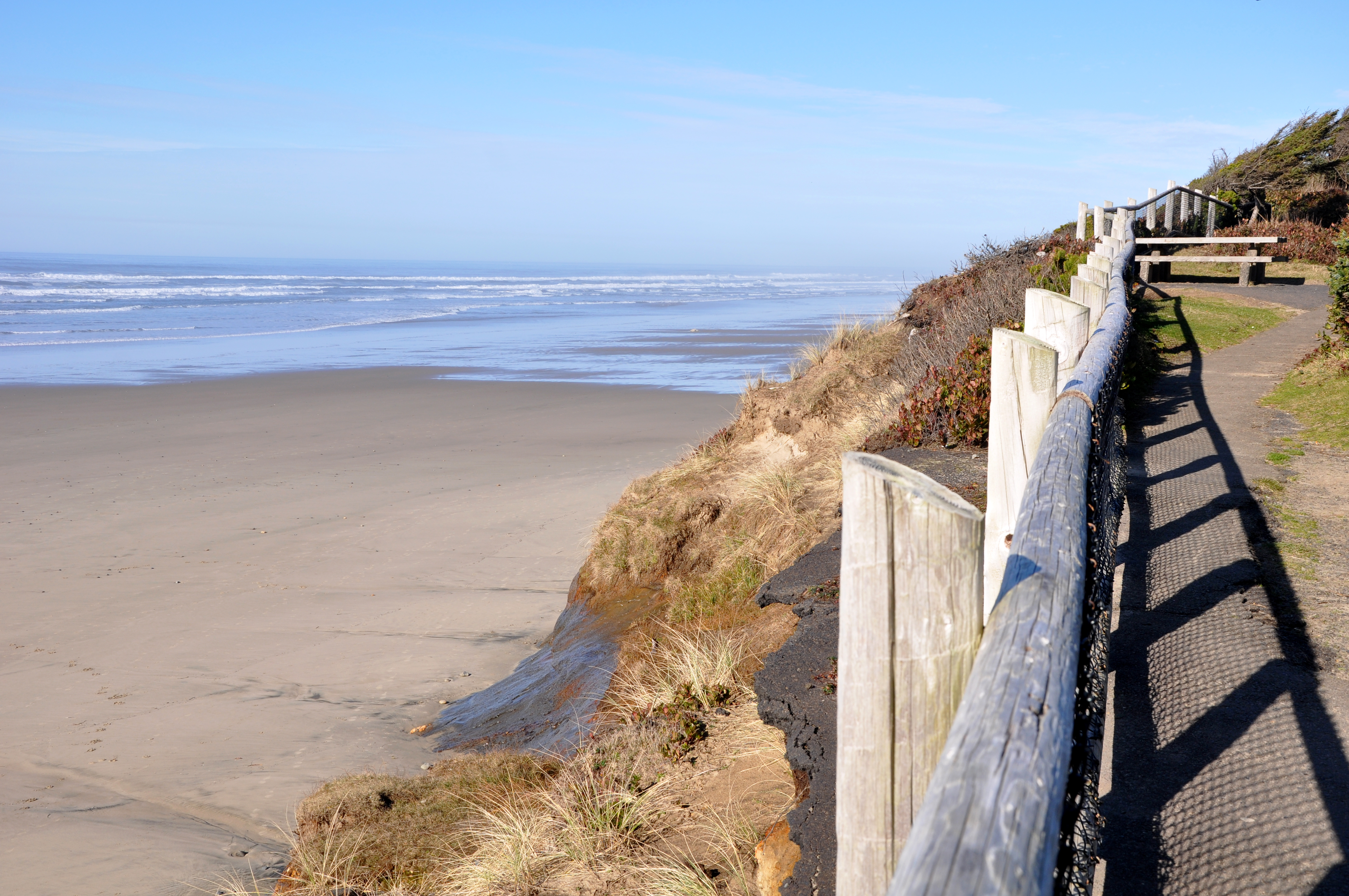
- Path and picnic table by the Pacific Ocean

- Location within Oregon Location within the United States
- Type: Public, state
- Location: Lincoln County, Oregon
- Nearest city: Newport
- Coordinates: 44°32′44″N 124°04′23″W
- Operator: Oregon Parks and Recreation Department

Lost Creek State Recreation Site is a state park in the U.S. state of Oregon, administered by the Oregon Parks and Recreation Department.

Located seven miles south of Newport, the park is developed for picnicking and beach access and offers beachcombing, whale watching and incredible sunsets.

== See also ==
- List of Oregon state parks
