= Carl G. Washburne Memorial State Park =

State park in Oregon, United States

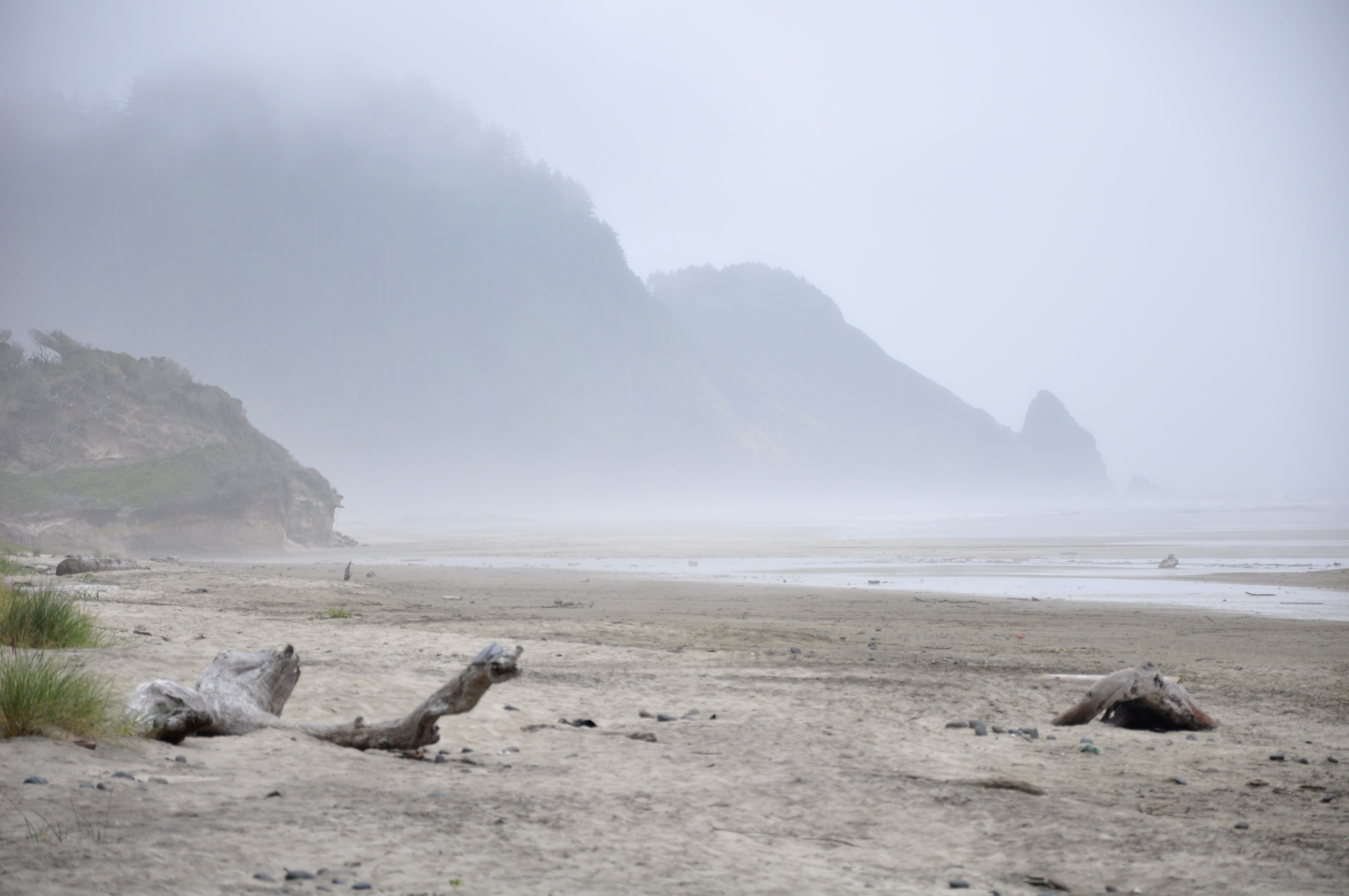
- Heceta Head as seen from the park beach

- Location within Oregon Location within the United States
- Interactive map of Carl G. Washburne Memorial State Park
- Type: Public, state
- Location: Lane County, Oregon
- Nearest city: Waldport
- Coordinates: 44°09′29″N 124°06′59″W
- Operator: Oregon Parks and Recreation Department

Carl G. Washburne Memorial State Park is a state park in the U.S. state of Oregon, administered by the Oregon Parks and Recreation Department. This park is in Lane County near Florence and Yachats. Very scenic wide beach, great for dogs, kids, kites. Some areas nearby are SNOWY PLOVER protected breeding areas, where dogs are banned, so be careful to keep dogs leashed if uncertain, and always in the State Park itself.

== Hobbit Trail ==
South of the park is the Hobbit Trail trail head located at mile 177.3 or 44.278421°N 124.113499°W.

== See also ==
- List of Oregon state parks
