= Ukiah–Dale Forest State Scenic Corridor =

Natural US landmark

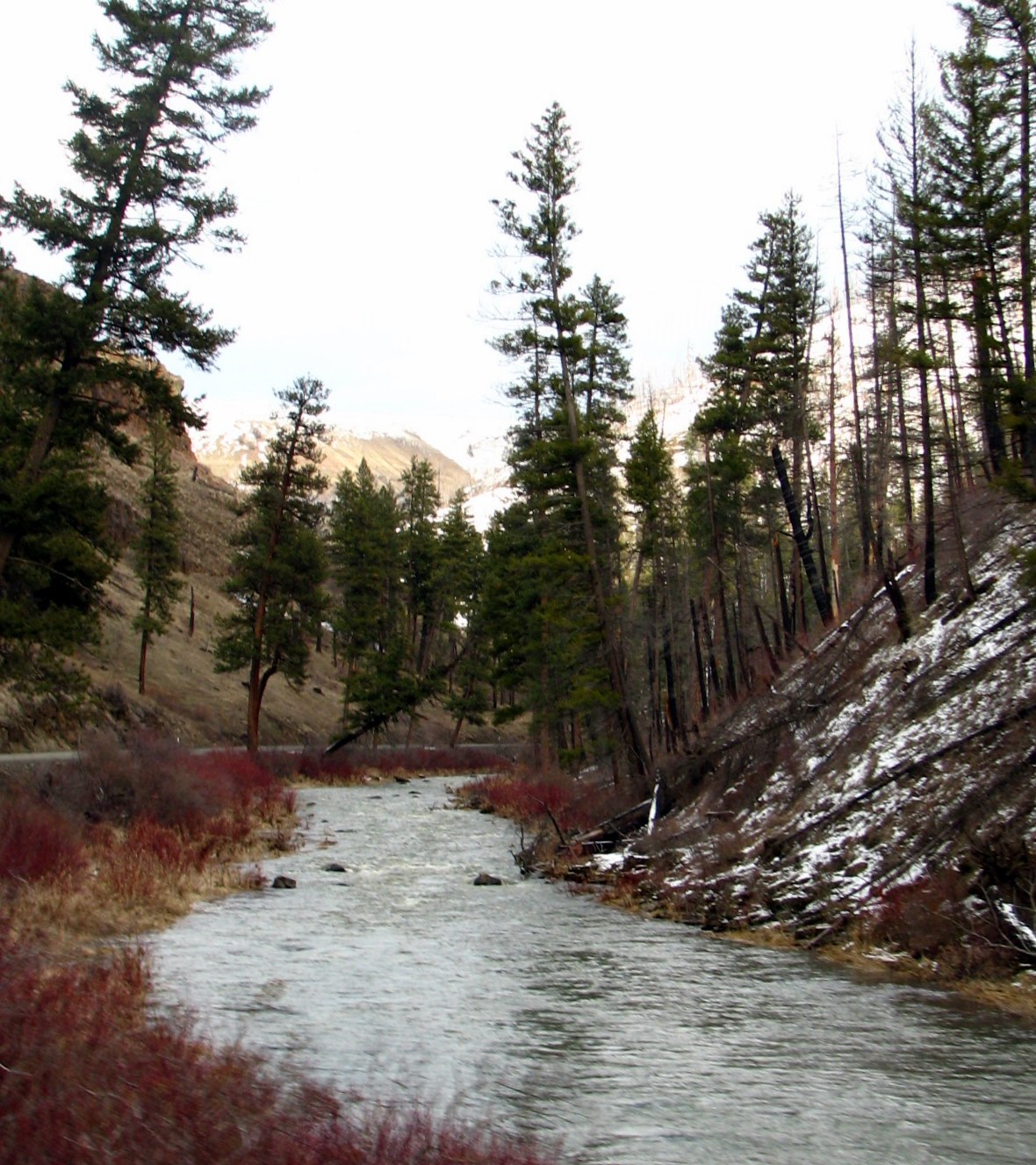
- North Fork of the John Day River

- Location within Oregon Location within the United States
- Type: Public, state
- Location: Umatilla County, Oregon
- Nearest city: Pendleton
- Coordinates: 45°07′32″N 118°58′18″W
- Operator: Oregon Parks and Recreation Department

Ukiah–Dale Forest State Scenic Corridor is a state park in the U.S. state of Oregon, administered by the Oregon Parks and Recreation Department.

== See also ==
- List of Oregon state parks
