= Clay Myers State Natural Area at Whalen Island =

State natural area in Oregon, United States

- Location within Oregon Location within the United States
- Interactive map of Clay Myers State Natural Area at Whalen Island
- Type: Public, state
- Location: Tillamook County, Oregon
- Nearest city: Tillamook
- Coordinates: 45°16′24″N 123°57′04″W
- Operator: Oregon Parks and Recreation Department

Clay Myers State Natural Area at Whalen Island is a state park in the U.S. state of Oregon, administered by the Oregon Parks and Recreation Department. The park was created in 2000 and named after a former secretary of state for the State of Oregon, Clay Myers. Although not a true island, Whalen Island is surrounded by Sand Lake Estuary and wetlands. Whalen Island can be visited on a 1.5 miles (2.4 km) loop trail around its perimeter.

== See also ==
- List of Oregon state parks
