= Neptune State Scenic Viewpoint =

American state park

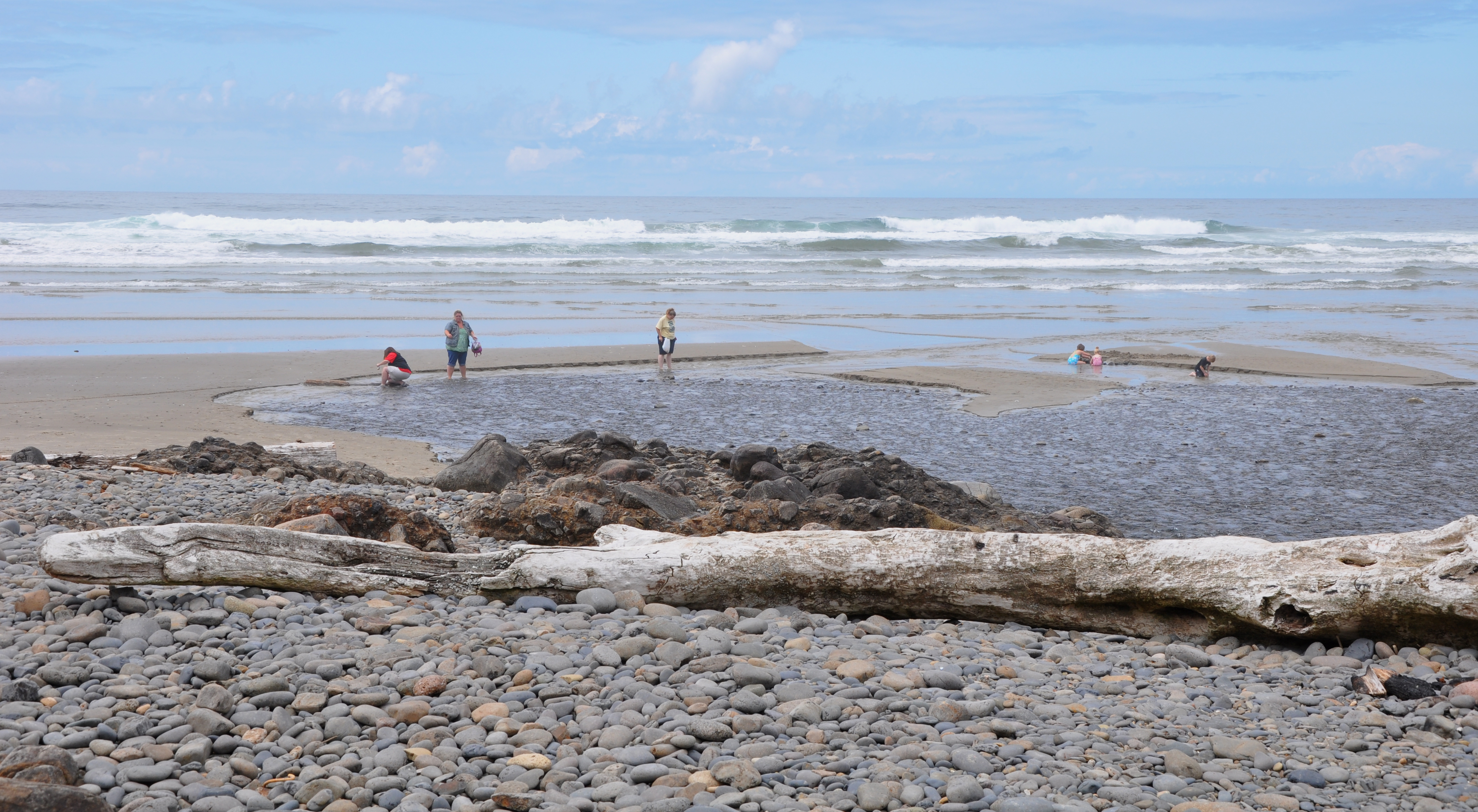
- Cumming Creek enters the ocean at Neptune

- Location within Oregon Location within the United States
- Type: Public, state
- Location: Lane County, Oregon
- Nearest city: Waldport
- Coordinates: 44°15′40″N 124°06′29″W
- Operator: Oregon Parks and Recreation Department

Neptune State Scenic Viewpoint is a state park in the U.S. state of Oregon, administered by the Oregon Parks and Recreation Department.

== See also ==
- List of Oregon state parks
