= Governor Patterson Memorial State Recreation Site =

State park in Oregon, United States

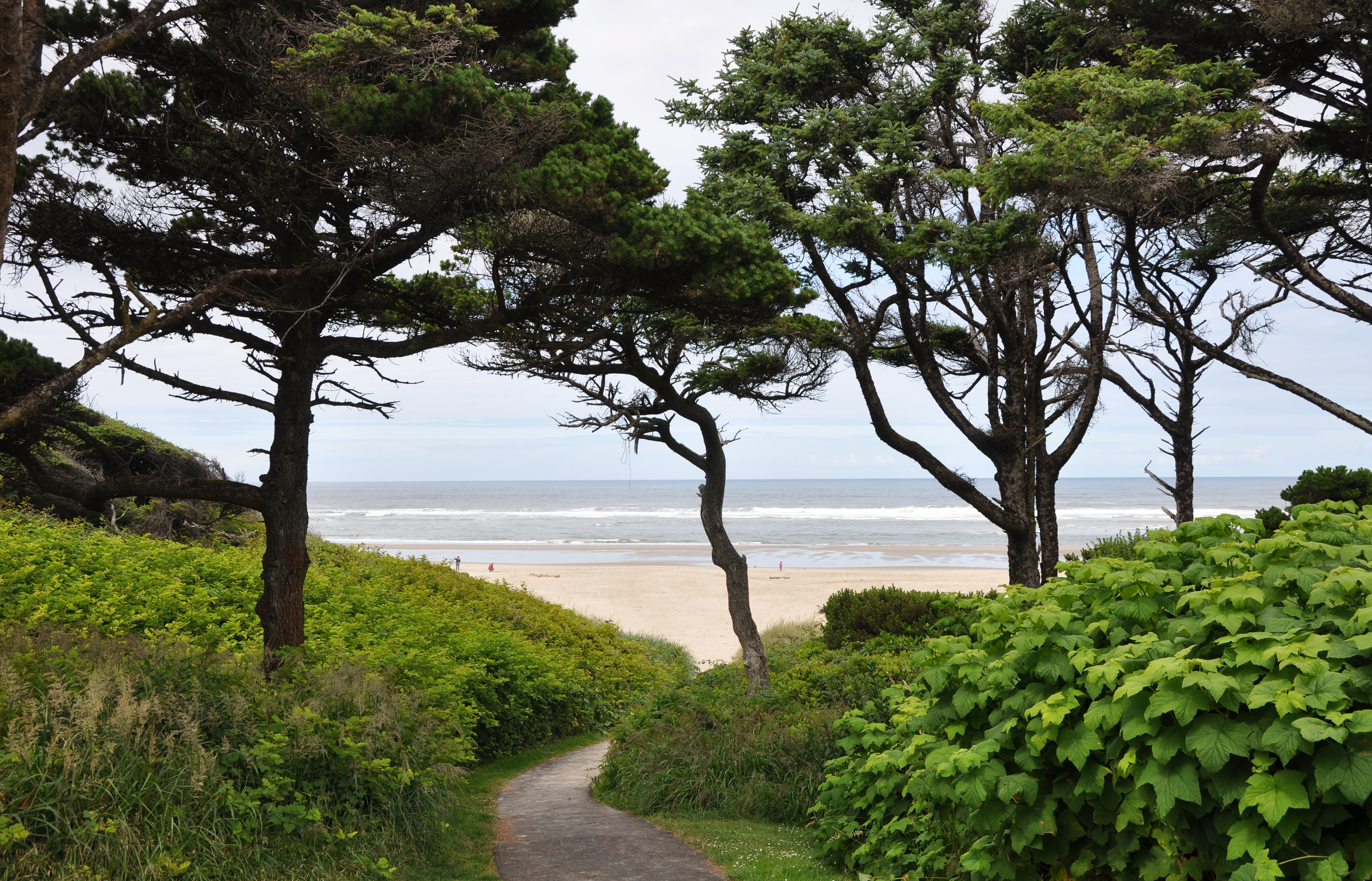
- Path to the beach

- Location within Oregon Location within the United States
- Type: Public, state
- Location: Lincoln County, Oregon
- Nearest city: Waldport
- Coordinates: 44°24′50″N 124°05′07″W
- Operator: Oregon Parks and Recreation Department

Governor Patterson Memorial State Recreation Site is a state park in the U.S. state of Oregon, administered by the Oregon Parks and Recreation Department.

== See also ==
- List of Oregon state parks
