= Ontario State Recreation Site =

State park in Oregon, United States

- Location within Oregon Location within the United States
- Type: Public, state
- Location: Malheur County, Oregon
- Nearest city: Ontario
- Coordinates: 44°02′40″N 116°58′14″W
- Operator: Oregon Parks and Recreation Department

Ontario State Recreation Site is a state park in the U.S. state of Oregon, administered by the Oregon Parks and Recreation Department.

== See also ==
- List of Oregon state parks
