= Bonnie Lure State Recreation Area =

State park in Oregon, United States

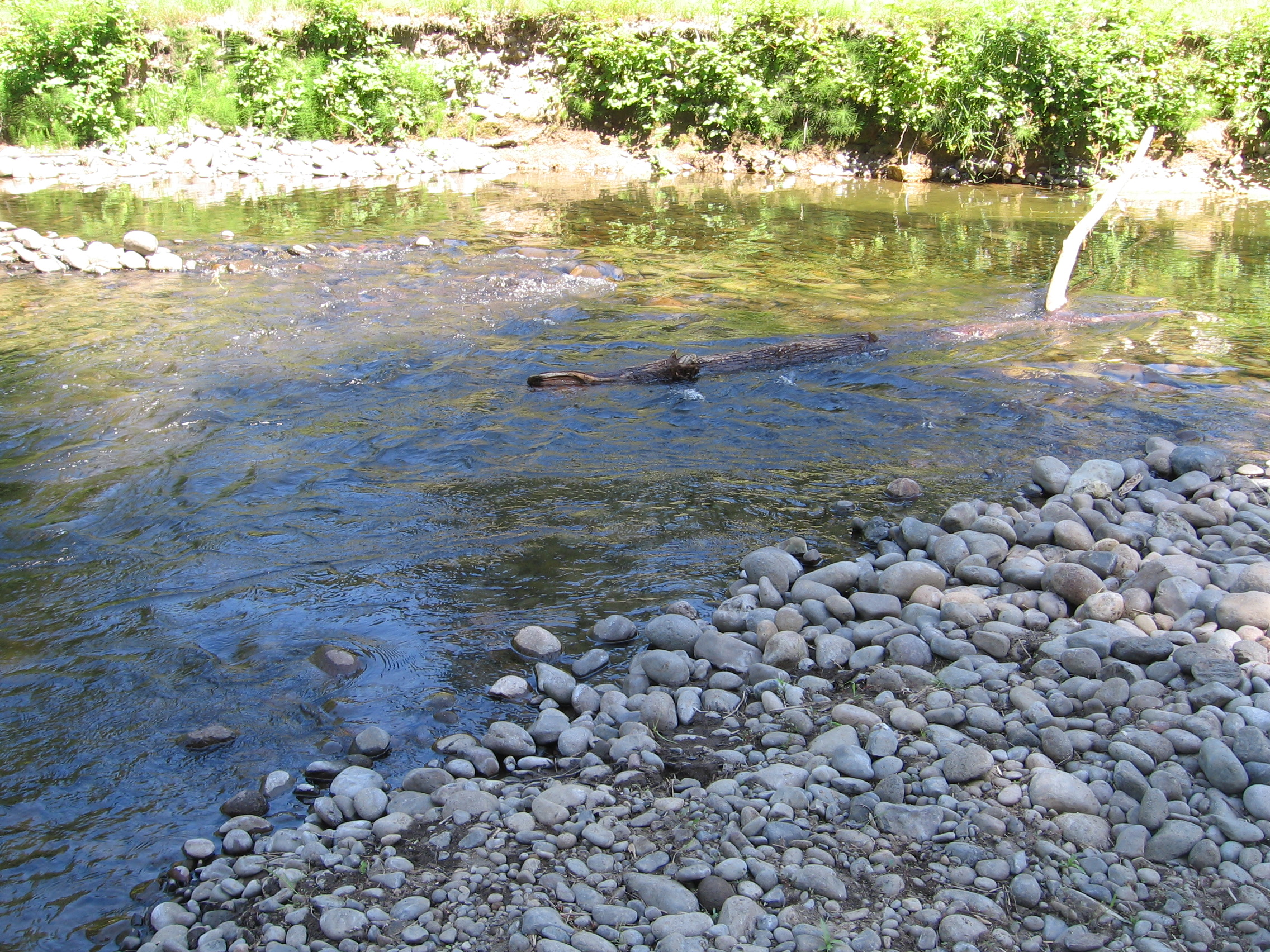
- Eagle Creek in the park

- Location within Oregon Location within the United States
- Interactive map of Bonnie Lure State Recreation Area
- Type: Public, state
- Location: Clackamas County, Oregon
- Nearest city: Damascus
- Coordinates: 45°21′07″N 122°22′36″W
- Operator: Oregon Parks and Recreation Department

Bonnie Lure State Recreation Area is a state park in the U.S. state of Oregon, administered by the Oregon Parks and Recreation Department.

== See also ==
- List of Oregon state parks
