= Warm Springs State Recreation Site =

- Interactive map of Warm Springs State Recreation Site
- Type: Public, state
- Coordinates: 44.760953°N 121.227550°W
- Operator: Oregon State Parks and Recreation Department

Warm Springs State Recreation Site was a state park in the U.S. state of Oregon, administered by the Oregon State Parks and Recreation Department.

The site is used for boat launch.

== See also ==
- List of Oregon state parks
