= Succor Creek State Natural Area =

State park in Oregon, United States

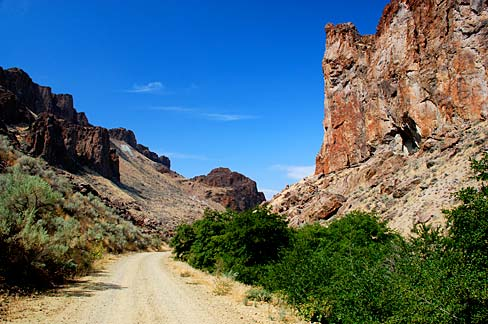
- Rock formations in the park

- Location within Oregon Location within the United States
- Type: Public, state
- Location: Malheur County, Oregon
- Nearest city: Nampa, Idaho
- Coordinates: 43°28′00″N 117°08′04″W
- Operator: Oregon Parks and Recreation Department

Succor Creek State Natural Area is a state park in the U.S. state of Oregon, administered by the Oregon Parks and Recreation Department.

== See also ==
- List of Oregon state parks
