= Seven Devils State Recreation Site =

State park in Oregon, United States

- Location within Oregon Location within the United States
- Type: Public, state
- Location: Coos County, Oregon
- Nearest city: Bandon
- Coordinates: 43°14′06″N 124°23′23″W
- Operator: Oregon Parks and Recreation Department

Seven Devils State Recreation Site is a state park and beach in the U.S. state of Oregon, administered by the Oregon Parks and Recreation Department.

== See also ==
- List of Oregon state parks
