= Arcadia Beach State Recreation Site =

State park in Oregon, United States

- Location within Oregon Location within the United States
- Type: Public state
- Location: Clatsop County, Oregon
- Nearest city: Cannon Beach
- Coordinates: 45°50′47″N 123°57′44″W
- Operator: Oregon Parks and Recreation Department

Arcadia Beach State Recreation Site is a beach and state park on the Oregon Coast of the United States located two miles south of Cannon Beach. Under the right conditions, one may hear the "singing sands", a squeaking or violin-like noise.

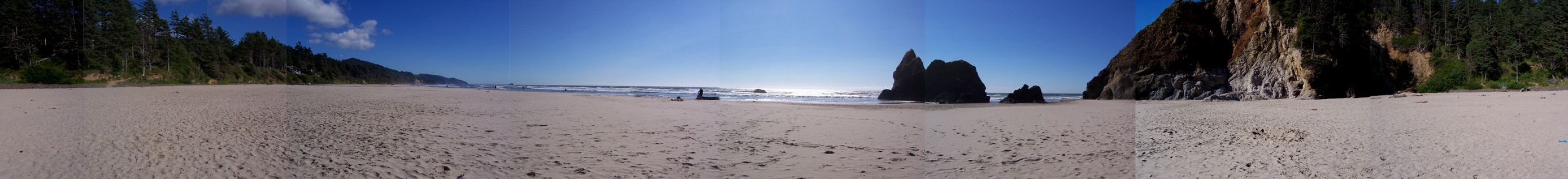
Arcadia Beach on a clear August day
