= Oregon Coast Trail =

Long-distance trail in the US

Coordinates: 44.2°N 124.0°W

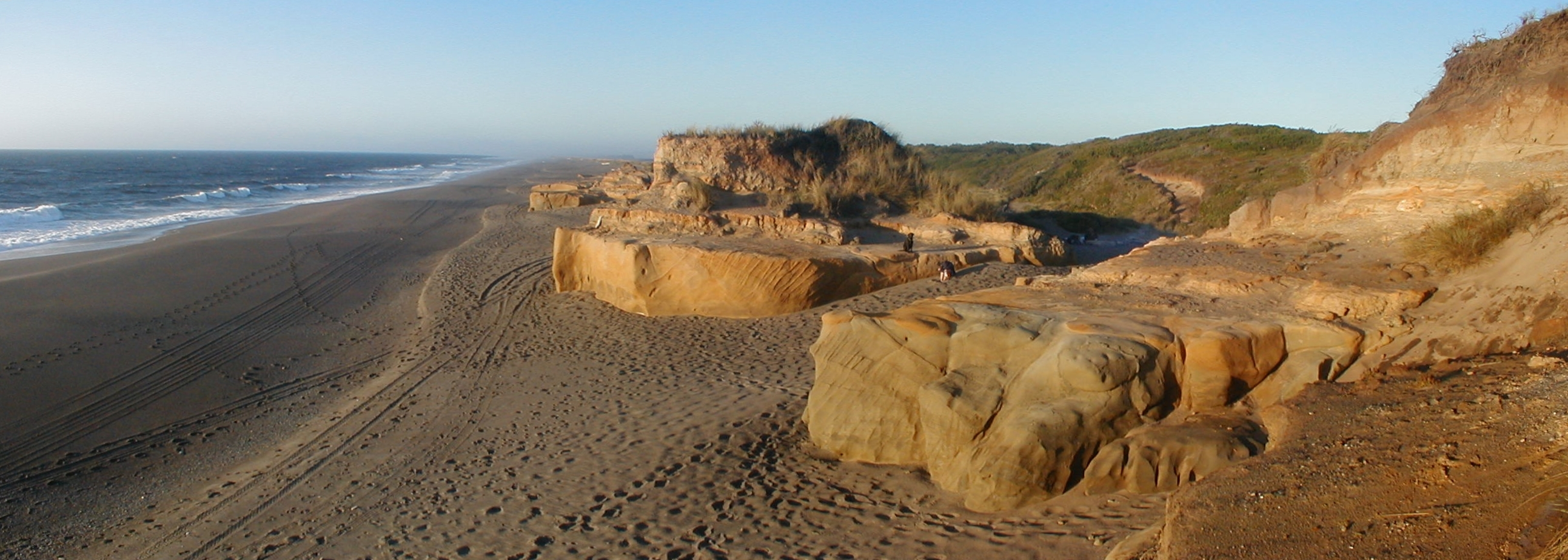
- The Oregon Coast Trail at Floras Lake, looking north to the BLM's New River Area of Critical Environmental Concern (ACEC)
- Length: 425 mi (684 km)
- Location: Pacific Ocean coast of Oregon, United States
- Trailheads: Mouth of the Columbia River/California border
- Use: Hiking
- Difficulty: Easy to moderate

The Oregon Coast Trail (OCT) is a long-distance hiking route along the Pacific coast of the U.S. state of Oregon in the United States. It follows the coast of Oregon from the mouth of the Columbia River to the California border south of Brookings.

The trail was envisioned in 1959 by Samuel N. Dicken, a University of Oregon geography professor, approved in 1971 by the Oregon Recreation Trails Advisory Council and developed and managed by the Oregon Parks and Recreation Department as part of the state park system of Oregon. The official coastal guide gives a length of 382 miles (615 km). About 39 percent of the route is on the beach, 41 percent is on paved road, and 20 percent is on trail and dirt roads. Private ferries can however be arranged at some estuaries to shortcut road segments. Walked in its entirety, linking each trail/beach section, the distance is approximately 425 miles.

A chief feature of the trail are the public beaches created in 1967 via the Oregon Beach Bill, which formalized the public nature of the coastal beaches since the first such law was passed in 1913. Many of the locations, particularly on the southern portion, are remote and isolated. The Oregon coast is bordered by a temperate rainforest, much of which is now second or third growth.

The difficulty of the trail ranges from easy to moderate, with elevation changes of up to a few hundred feet.

== Route ==
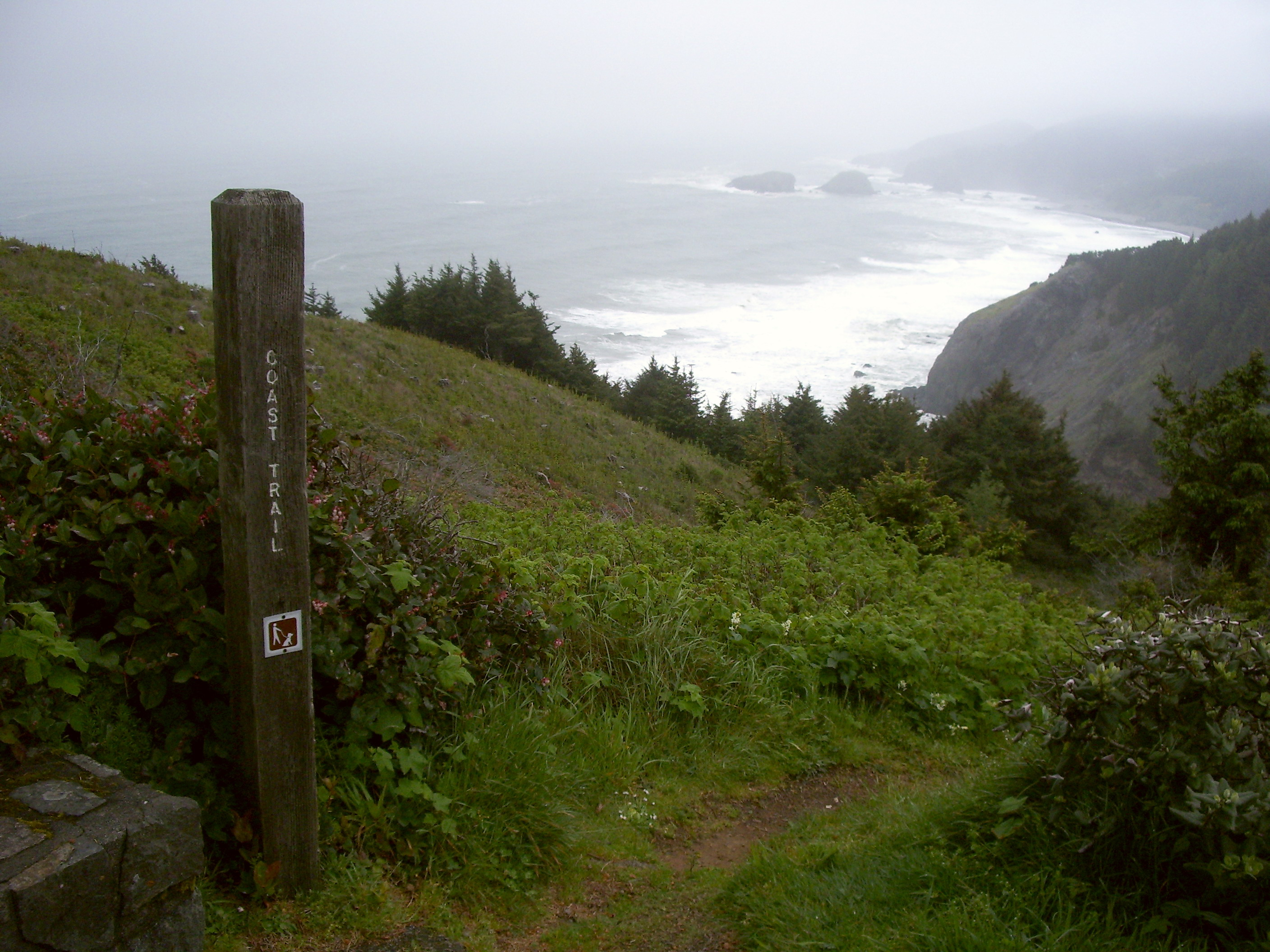
Oregon Coast Trail crossing over a headland in Samuel H. Boardman State Park

The northern trailhead is at the base of the south jetty of the Columbia River, approximately 4 miles (6 km) north of the campground of Fort Stevens State Park and about 13 miles (21 km) from the city of Astoria. The trail runs north-south along the entire Oregon Coast, following the shore as closely as practical. For many portions of the route, it is beach walking, mostly on sand. In populated areas it often follows the nearest street to the shore. Many parts of the trail leave the beach and take an inland path, usually where land formations make the shoreline impassable, such as at Cape Kiwanda. Some of the rocky headlands are passable on foot at beach level only at low tide. Other headlands are traversed by state park or forest service trails well above the sea. In many other places, the road is the only feasible route, mostly U.S. Route 101. The southern terminus of the trail is the unmarked Oregon/California border on a stretch of beach about 5 miles (8 km) south of Brookings, and about half a mile south of the Winchuck River.

Besides headlands, there are numerous rivers and creeks which must be crossed. Most creeks are forded by wading, although sometimes the water can be waist deep even at low tide. At high tide, some are hazardous or impossible to cross and require a boat or a detour to a bridge. Rainfall during winter and early spring decreases the number of streams which are safely fordable.

== Trail-walking information ==
The Oregon Coast Trail (OCT) is a described route and not a continuous trail. Thirty-nine percent of the route is on beaches. Forty-one percent, or more than 150 miles (240 km) of the route is on pavement. Twenty percent follows trails. If walked in its entirety (without taking ferries), the total distance is approximately 425 miles. The OCT is signed throughout its length, but in some places signage is not reliable. However it is difficult to become lost since the route is never more than a few miles from a paved road. In 2009, the State of Oregon posted a set of downloadable maps with brief route descriptions.

A dedicated guidebook for the OCT was published in 2015, called Exploring the Oregon Coast Trail. Written by Connie Soper, the book details 40 consecutive day hikes, and also includes maps and logistical information for the entire Oregon Coast Trail, such as tidal considerations and arranging for boat rides. The trail is open to hikers, and in some places, to bicycles, and equestrians (but not the entire route). As portions of the route lead around headlands or cross river mouths that are only passable at low tide, carrying a current tide table and relevant topographic information can be extremely helpful. Sometimes a hiker must choose between waiting for a lower tide or walking inland to avoid high water.

Seasonal recreation restrictions are in place from March 15 through September 15 in some locations to protect shorebird nesting. These restrictions include complete prohibition of dogs, camping, non-motorized vehicles (including bicycles and fat bikes), motorized vehicles, and kites. Hikers and equestrians must also stay on the wet sand. Shorebird areas are clearly marked on the beach with yellow signs.

Many state campgrounds have areas dedicated for hikers and bicyclists at reduced prices (compared to vehicles). Beach camping is allowed where out of sight of residences, not adjacent to state parks, and not near snowy plover during nesting season. This limits camping on some areas of the trail to developed campgrounds, particularly along the northern beaches. Oregon Parks Forever funded the creation and installation of nine Hiker/Biker pods for tent campers in state parks along the coast: They are located in hiker/biker camps at Fort Stevens, Devil’s Lake, Cape Blanco, Harris Beach, Cape Lookout, Bullards Beach, Nehalem Bay, Beverly Beach, Honeyman, and Sunset Bay. The State of Oregon has stated its intention to create more primitive and free camping areas.

Vehicles are allowed on a few beaches. Dune buggies are used extensively in the Oregon Dunes National Recreation Area, a 40-mile (64 km) stretch of beach from Florence to Coos Bay.

Several portions of the trail are pristine and secluded, such as the segment from Bandon to Port Orford, where several days of relative solitude and free camping exist.

Prevailing winds are from the northwest which makes the trail easier to hike from north to south. Route descriptions are also written assuming a north to south direction of travel.

Cities and towns of various sizes are located along Highway 101 every 20 to 25 miles (32 to 40 km) permitting re-provisioning on a regular basis. Public transportation is extremely limited along the coast.

== Points of interest ==
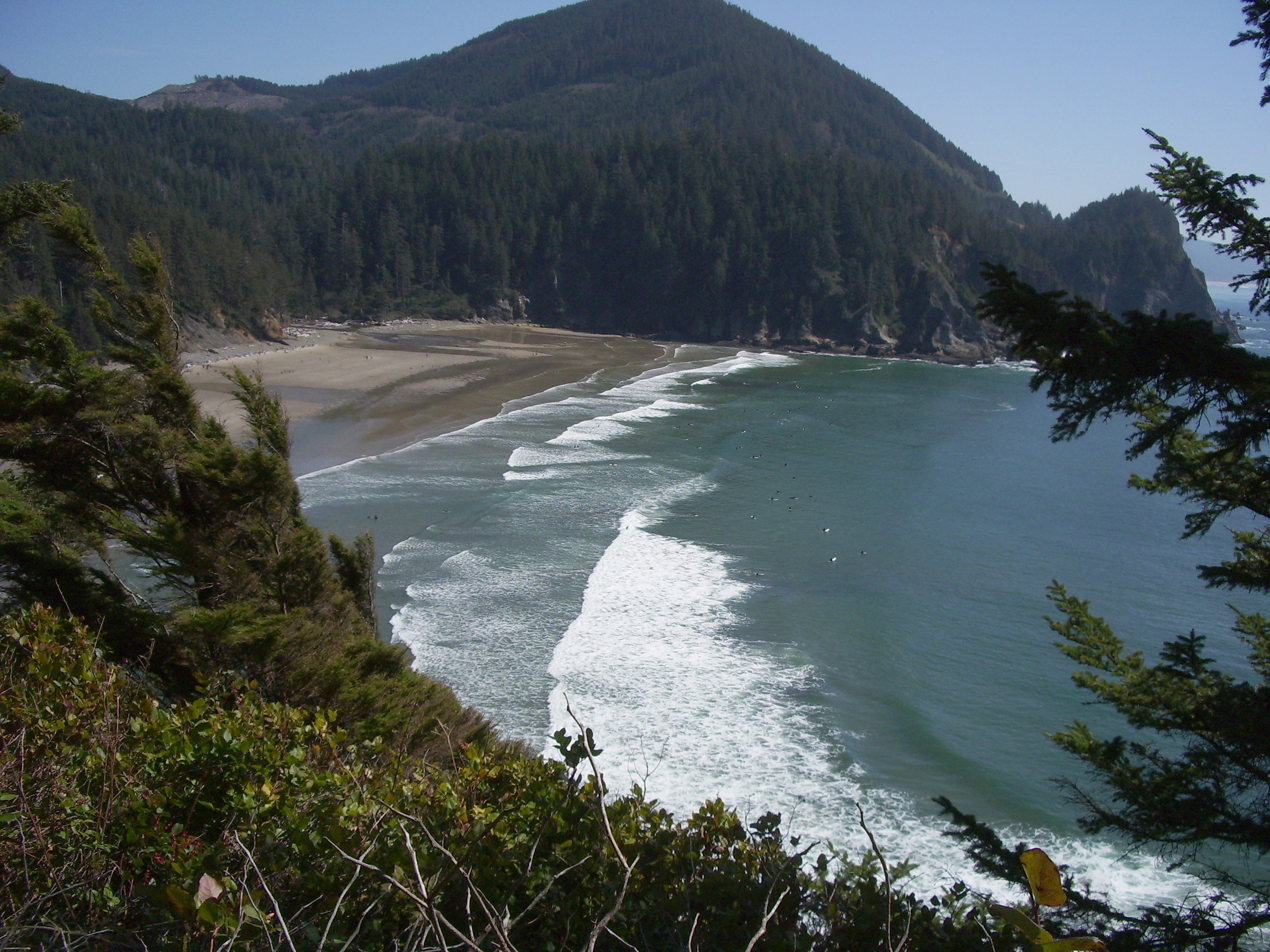
The sand beach at Oswald West State Park's Smuggler Cove seen from the Oregon Coast Trail

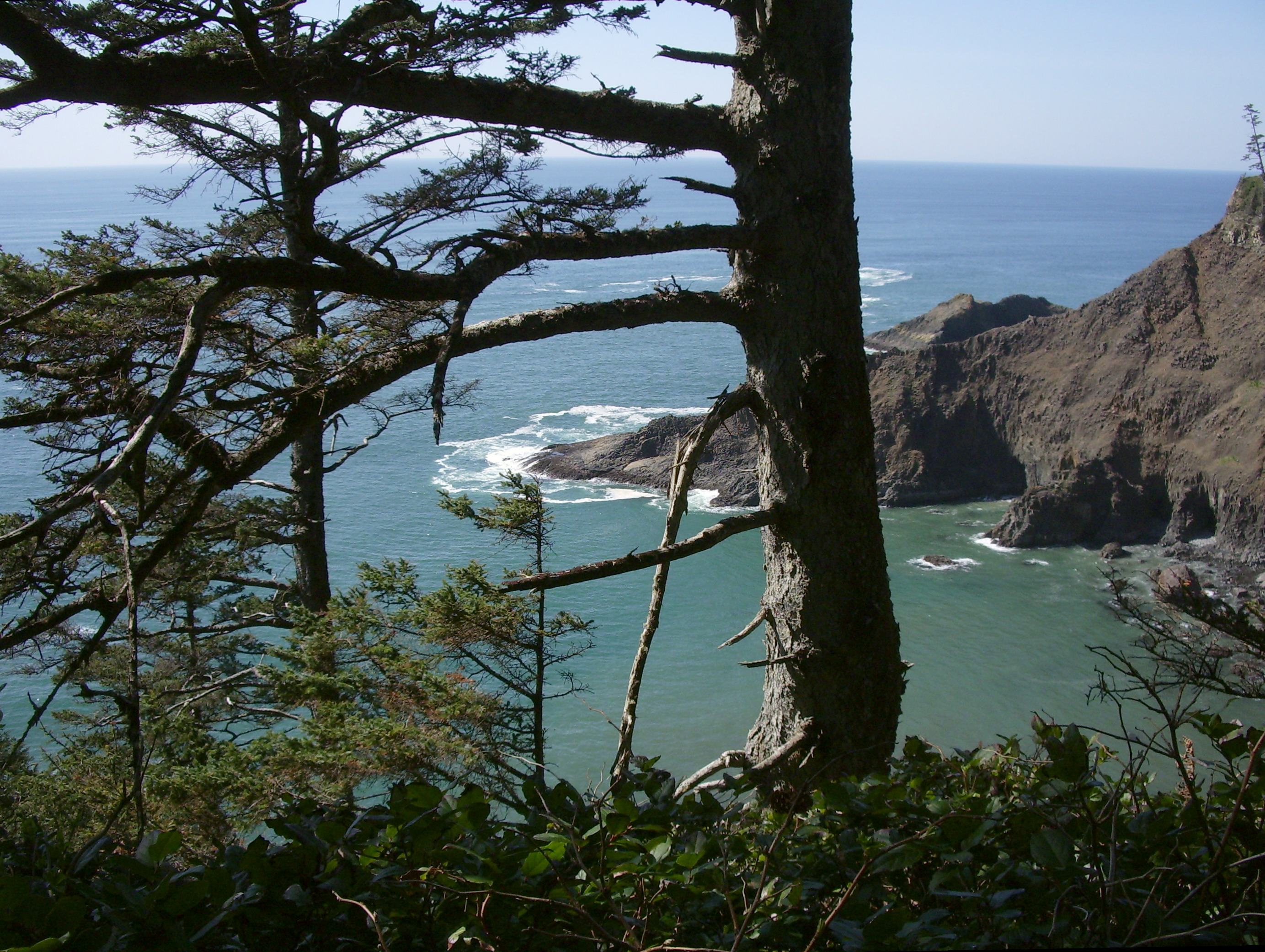
Headlands visible from Oregon Coast Trail north of Cape Falcon within Oswald West State Park

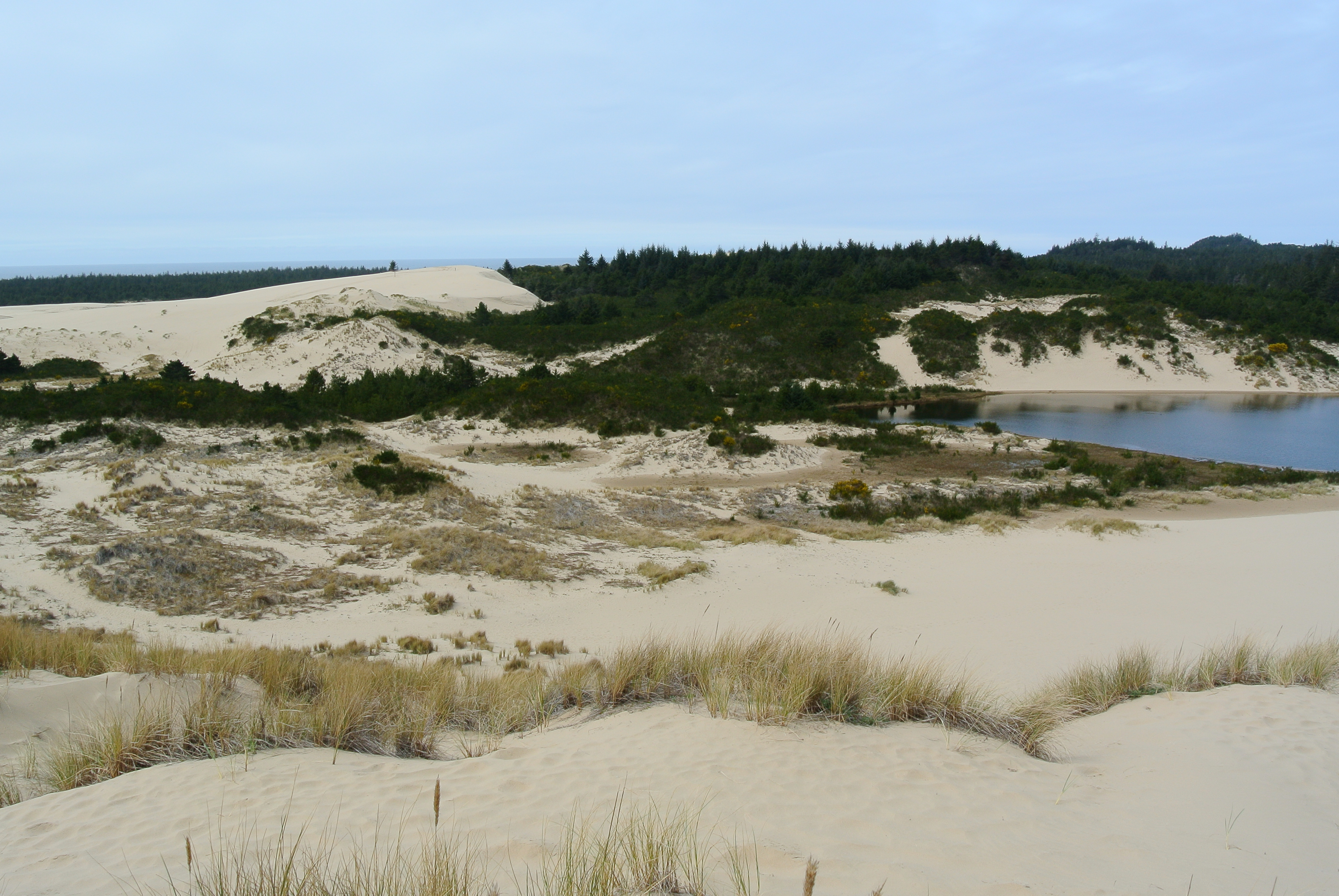
Sand dunes in Jessie M. Honeyman Memorial State Park

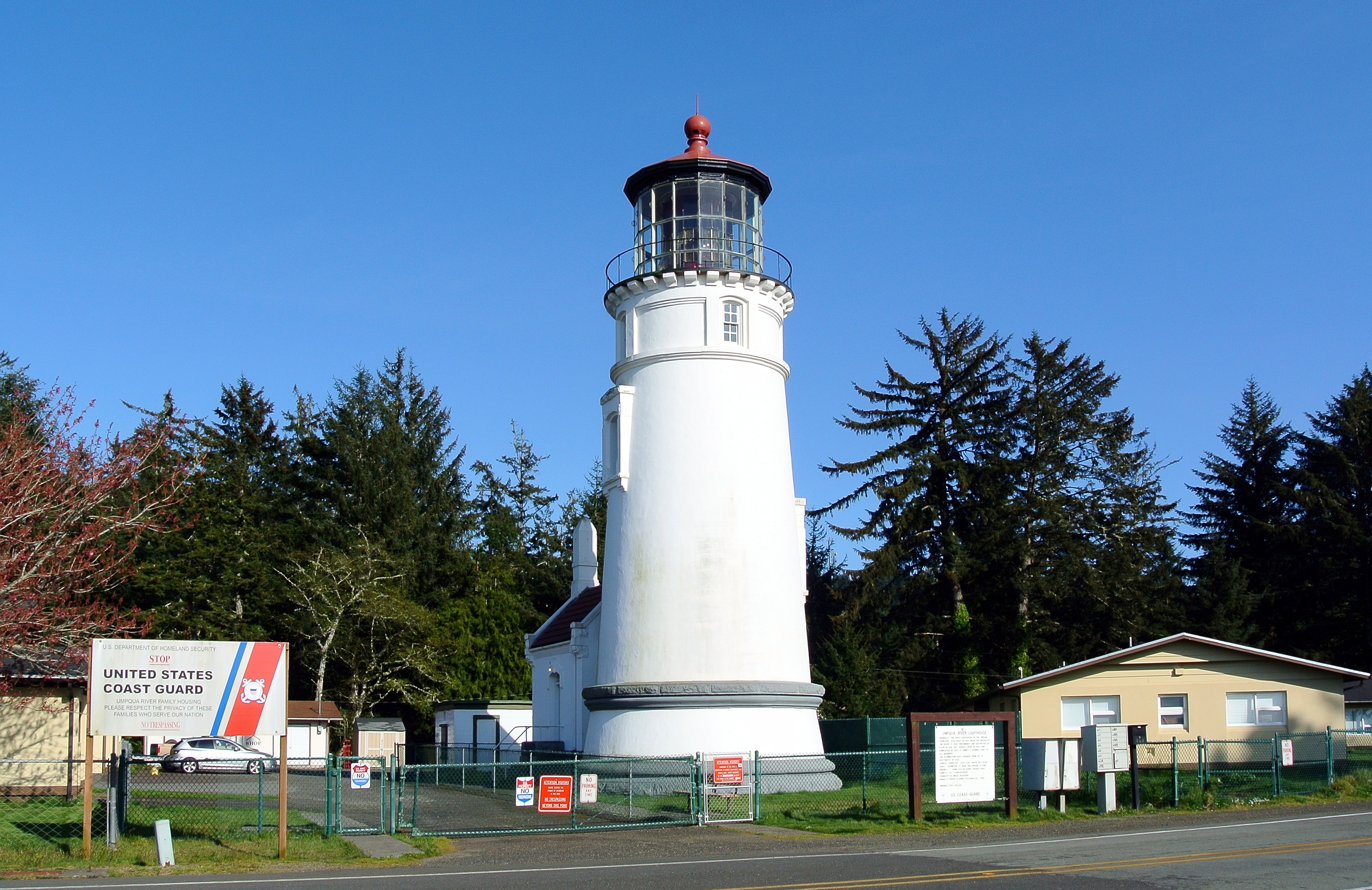
Umpqua River lighthouse

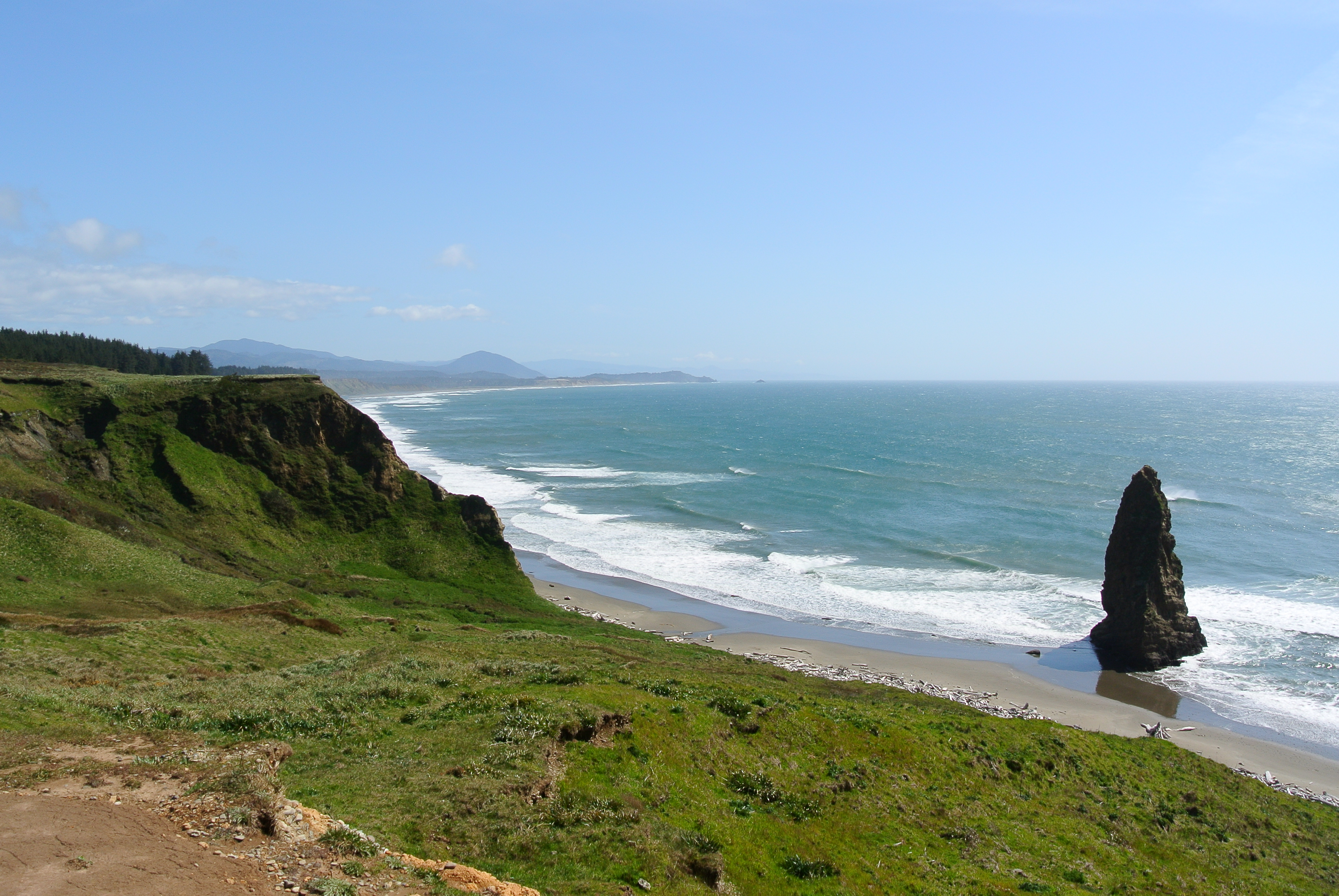
Cape Blanco looking south towards Port Orford Heads State Park, Humbug Mountain in the background, Pinnacle Rock in the frontground.

Places found along the OCT from north to south.

- Fort Stevens State Park
- Gearhart, at the mouth of the Necanicum River
- Seaside
- Tillamook Head
- Ecola State Park
- Cannon Beach
- Oswald West State Park
- Manzanita
- Nehalem and Nehalem Bay State Park
- Garibaldi
- Tillamook Bay
- Tillamook
- Cape Meares State Park
- Oceanside
- Netarts
- Cape Lookout and Cape Lookout State Park
- Neskowin
- Lincoln City
- Depoe Bay
- Devils Punch Bowl State Natural Area
- Beverly Beach State Park
- Newport
- South Beach State Park
- Ona Beach State Park
- Seal Rock State Recreation Site
- Waldport
- Yachats
- Neptune State Scenic Viewpoint
- Carl G. Washburne Memorial State Park
- Heceta Head Light
- Jessie M. Honeyman Memorial State Park
- Oregon Dunes National Recreation Area
- Reedsport
- Umpqua Lighthouse State Park
- Coos Bay
- Bullards Beach State Park
- BLM primitive campground, at the New River ACEC
- Boice Cope Park, a Curry County campground at Floras Lake
- Cape Blanco and Cape Blanco State Park
- Humbug Mountain State Park
- Gold Beach and Rogue River (Oregon)
- Samuel Boardman State Park
- Harris Beach State Park
- Natural Bridges Viewpoint, near Brookings
- Brookings
- Winchuck River

== See also ==
- List of lighthouses on the Oregon Coast
- California Coastal Trail
