= New River (Oregon) =

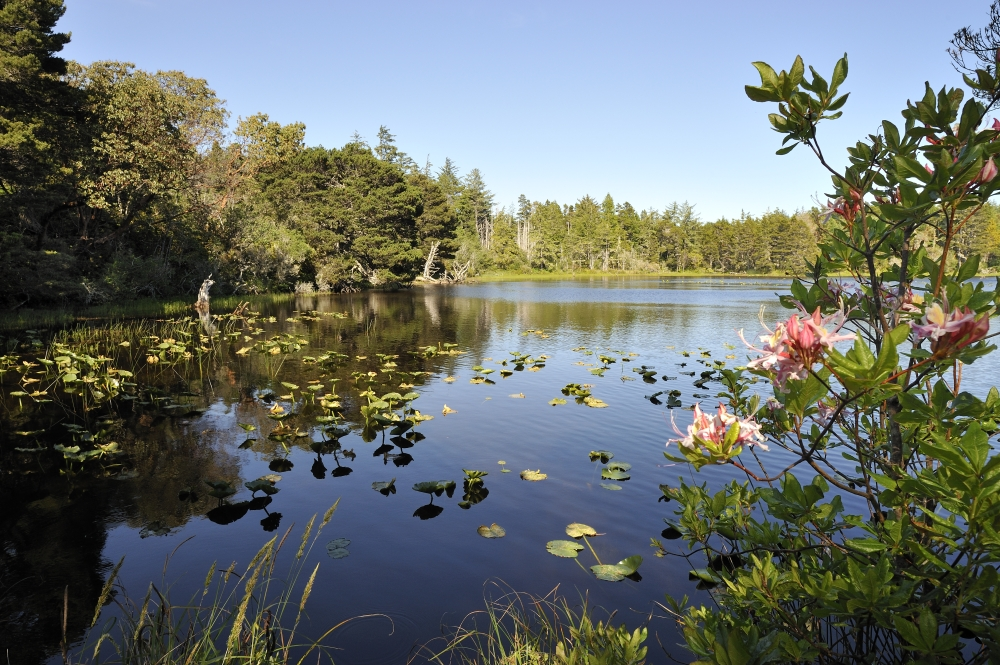
- Mud Lake at New River ACEC in June

- Location of the mouth of the New River in Oregon

Location
- Country: United States
- State: Oregon
- County: Curry and Coos

Physical characteristics
- Source: Confluence of Floras Lake outlet with Floras Creek
  - location: near Langlois, Curry County, Oregon
  - coordinates: 42°54′48″N 124°29′51″W
  - elevation: 13 ft (4.0 m)
- Mouth: Pacific Ocean
  - location: south of Bandon State Natural Area, Coos County, Oregon, United States
  - coordinates: 43°00′02″N 124°27′30″W
  - elevation: 3 ft (0.91 m)
- Length: 8 mi (13 km)
- Basin size: 126 sq mi (330 km^{2})
- Discharge
  - average: 350 cu ft/s (9.9 m^{3}/s)
- Discharge
  - location: Pacific Ocean

The New River is a stream, about 8 miles (13 km) long, on the southern coast of the U.S. state of Oregon. It begins slightly north of Floras Lake, at the confluence of the lake outlet and Floras Creek, and runs north behind a foredune until entering the Pacific Ocean between Bandon and Port Orford.

The river's name stems from its creation in 1890, when sand blocked the outlet from Floras Lake during a heavy storm, and the resulting flood created a new channel behind the foredune. The water from 21-mile (34 km) Floras Creek also flows down the new channel. The river loses only 10 feet (3 m) in elevation between source and mouth.

== Pre-history ==
Evidence suggests that as early as 8,000 years ago, long before the New River existed, ancestors of the Siletz and Coquille peoples lived here in large villages near an estuary. On January 26, 1700, a 30-foot (9 m) tsunami destroyed the estuary and altered the landscape. After the catastrophe, blowing sand blocked streams, creating wetlands behind the dunes.

== Wildlife ==
The area near the river, between Bandon to the north and Cape Blanco to the south, includes many state, federal, and county parks, recreation areas, and wildlife sanctuaries. Among those are the New River Area of Critical Environmental Concern (ACEC), overseen by the Bureau of Land Management. The BLM encourages public uses of the 1,200-acre (490 ha) site at the same time it works to protect habitat for native plants, birds, animals, and fish.

European beachgrass, an invasive species, was planted here in the early 20th century to stabilize the dunes, which can grow to 30 feet (9 m) high. The dunes kept the river in its new channel but displaced native vegetation such as sand verbena and otherwise altered the habitats used by birds and other life forms.

The New River is the southernmost area of record for rufous hummingbirds and the most northern for Allen's hummingbirds to have been observed breeding. Snowy plovers are present year-round. Posted areas within the ACEC are closed to the public from March 15 to September 15 to protect nesting plovers. The spring migration brings approximately 20,000 Aleutian cackling geese (Branta hutchinsii leucopareia) and close to 100,000 shorebirds.

== Recreation ==
The New River ACEC comprises four units—Storm Ranch, Floras Lake, Fourmile Creek, and Lost Lake—connected by hiking trails to parking, restrooms, a Nature Center, and other structures. River Road, with a gravel surface suitable for bicycling and horseback-riding, as well as walking, leads from the parking area to a boat ramp on the New River.

Canoers and kayakers can launch at Floras Lake and float down the lake outlet and down New River to a takeout at the ACEC's Storm Ranch, a trip of about 8 miles (13 km), or an ACEC takeout at Lower Fourmile Road, a mile further downstream. The Lower Fourmile takeout involves at 0.2-mile (0.3 km) portage to a parking lot along Lower Fourmile Road. The Storm Ranch route may also require a portage since the River Road gate is closed to vehicles from March 15 to September 15.

The New River supports populations of Chinook salmon and other migratory fish. The river is closed to fishing for coho salmon, but anglers can fish for Chinook, steelhead, and searun cutthroat trout from the river banks or from boats without motors. Surfperch frequent the river mouth.

== See also ==
- List of rivers of Oregon
