= Bandon State Natural Area =

State park in the U.S. state of Oregon

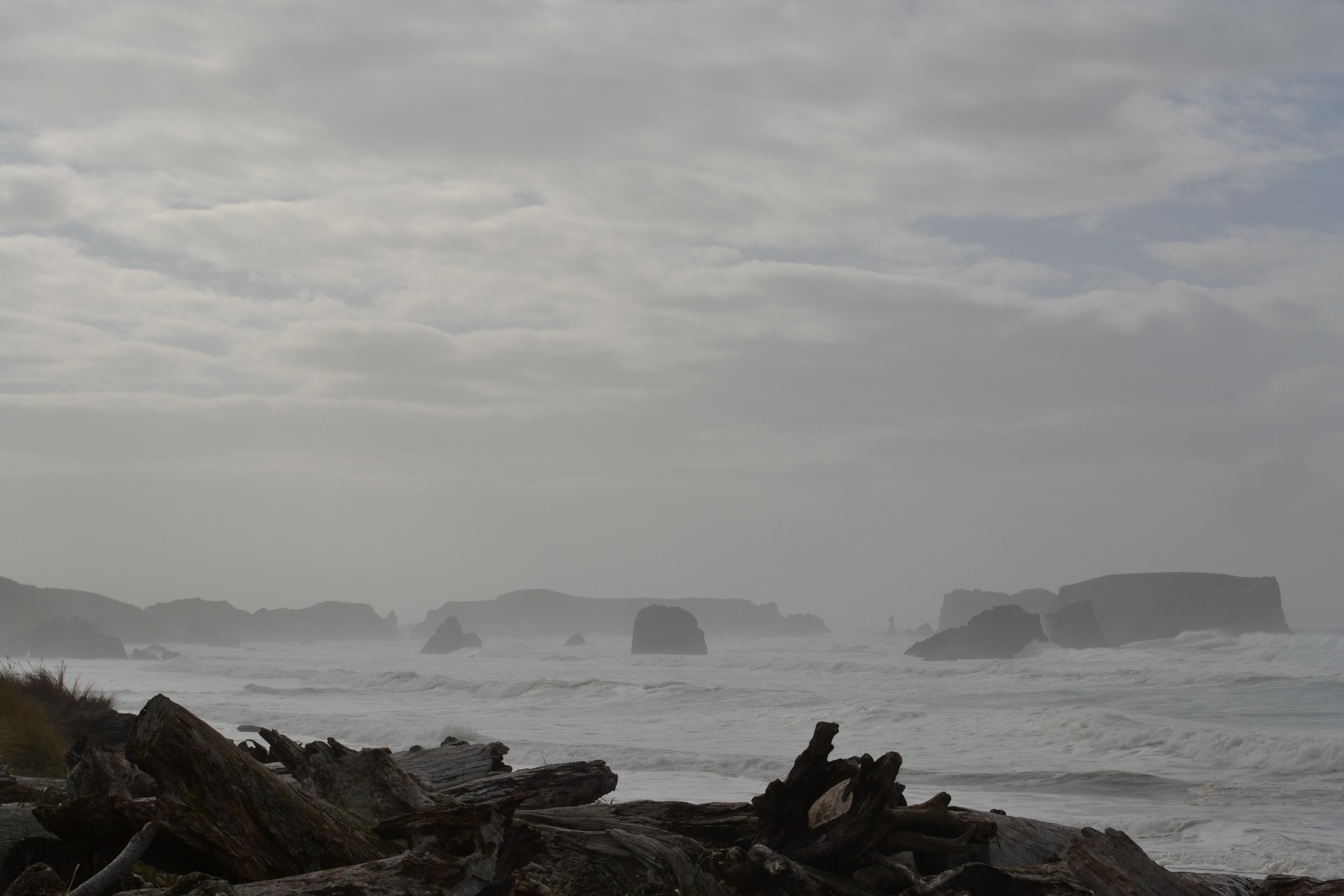
- Ocean view from the park

- Location within Oregon Location within the United States
- Interactive map of Bandon State Natural Area
- Type: Public, state
- Location: Coos County, Oregon
- Nearest city: Bandon
- Coordinates: 43°03′23″N 124°26′05″W
- Area: about 879 acres (356 ha)
- Elevation: 26 ft (8 m)
- Created: Between 1954 and 1970
- Operator: Oregon Parks and Recreation Department
- Visitors: 27,000 annually
- Open: Year-round

Bandon State Natural Area is a state park in the U.S. state of Oregon. It is administered by the Oregon Parks and Recreation Department. The 879-acre (356 ha) park lies west of U.S. Route 101, off Beach Loop Drive, about 5 miles (8 km) south of Bandon. The Oregon Coast Trail passes through the park.

The park is open year-round; annual day-use visitation is about 27,000. Amenities include beach access, hiking trails, birdwatching spots, fishing access, restrooms, parking, and picnic tables. The average elevation is about 26 feet (8 m) above sea level.

Three separate entrances lead to separate parking areas within the park. The two to the south offer beach access but no other amenities. The third, Devil's Kitchen, has picnic tables, seating benches, paths to the beach, and restrooms.

== See also ==
- List of Oregon state parks
