= Floras Lake =

Lake in the U.S. state of Oregon

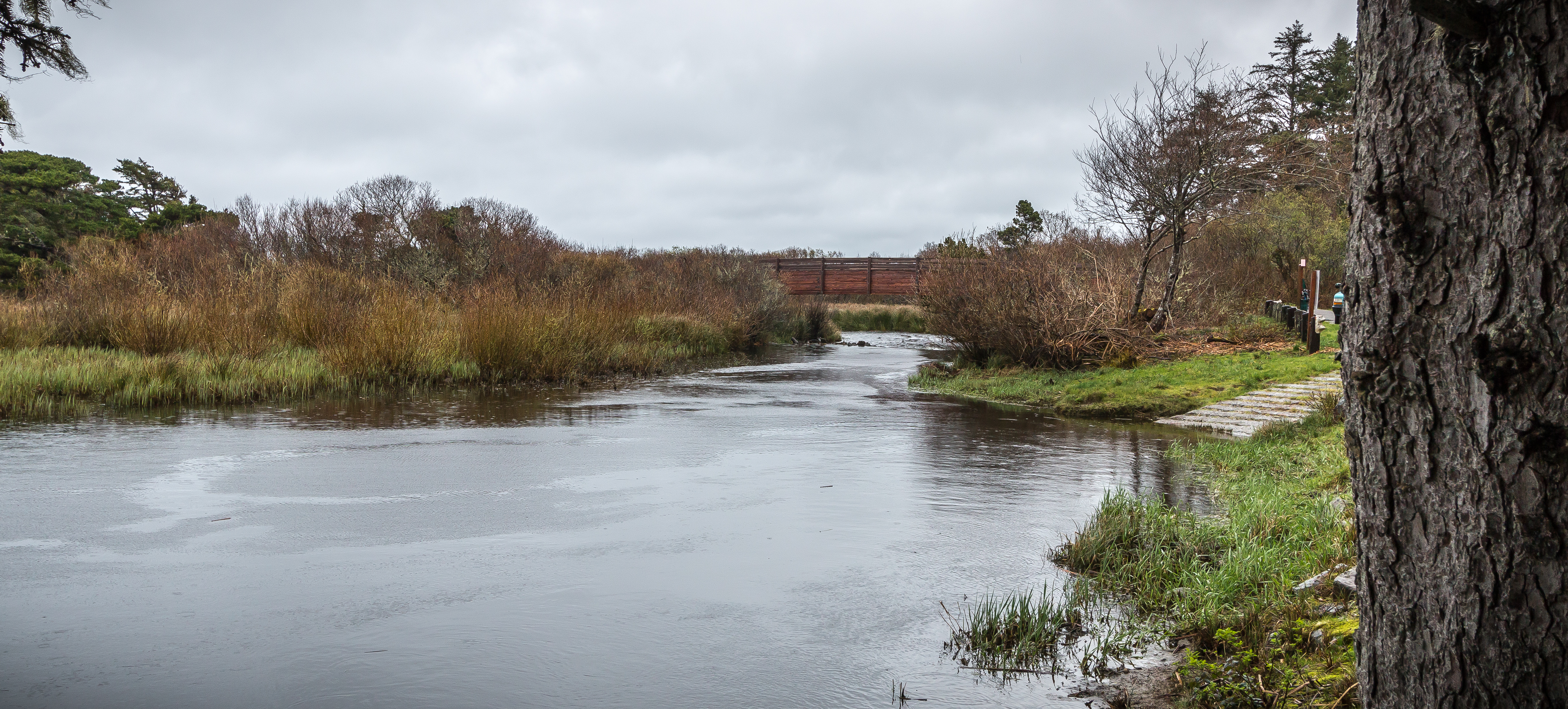
- Floras Lake, March 2017

- Location within Oregon Location within the United States
- Location: Near Pacific Ocean coast in Curry County, Oregon
- Coordinates: 42°53′41″N 124°30′18″W
- Lake type: Natural, mesotrophic
- Primary inflows: Four unnamed tributaries
- Primary outflows: New River (Floras Creek)
- Catchment area: 10 mi^{2} (26 km^{2})
- Basin countries: United States
- Surface area: 236 acres (96 ha)
- Average depth: 18 ft (5 m)
- Max. depth: 35 ft (11 m)
- Water volume: 4,300 acre⋅ft (5.3 hm^{3})
- Residence time: Two months
- Shore length^{1}: 5.2 mi (8.4 km)
- Surface elevation: 10 feet (3 m)
- Settlements: Port Orford (10 miles (16 km) to the south
- ^{1} Shore length is not a well-defined measure.

Floras Lake is a natural 236-acre (96 ha) body of water on the southern Oregon Coast of the United States. Fed by four small tributaries from a basin of about 10 square miles (26 km^{2}) in Curry County, it lies about 10 miles (16 km) north of Port Orford and 2 miles (3 km) west of U.S. Route 101. It was probably named for Fred Flora, a 19th-century settler and miner who lived nearby.

The lake, with a mean elevation of about 10 feet (3 m) above sea level, empties north into Floras Creek, where the combined streams form the New River. The river flows north behind a foredune until veering west and entering the Pacific Ocean through a break in the dune.

Relatively remote, the lake and the 1,371-acre (555 ha) Floras Lake State Natural Area, can be reached on foot from the south along a 1.5-mile (2.4 km) trail that begins at Cape Blanco Airport. More common is to approach by car on Floras Lake Road off U.S. Route 101. This leads to Boice–Cope County Park, at the northeastern corner of the lake.

The area near the lake, between Bandon to the north and Cape Blanco to the south, includes many state, federal, and county parks, recreation areas, and wildlife sanctuaries. Among those are the New River Area of Critical Environmental Concern (ACEC), overseen by the Bureau of Land Management north of the lake and west of the county park. The county park, which has campsites and day-use facilities, offers access to the New River ACEC as well as the lake.

== Recreation ==
Sailboarding, especially for beginners because of the lake environment and wind conditions, is popular at Floras Lake.

Boice–Cope County Park provides a boat ramp for sport fishing at the lake, which is stocked with rainbow trout and supports a small population of largemouth bass. It is also part of the migratory route for Chinook salmon and other seagoing fish on their way to and from the lake's feeder streams.

The Floras Lake Trail, one of the four trails in the New River ACEC, connects the county park to the Floras Lake State Natural Area. About 1.2 miles (1.9 km) long, it passes between the lake and the foredune on the west. The beach west of the foredune is part of a 22-mile (35 km) stretch of sand between Bandon and Cape Blanco named part of the Oregon Coast Trail by the Oregon Department of Parks and Recreation.

Canoers and kayakers can launch at Floras Lake and float down the outlet and down New River to a takeout at the ACEC's Storm Ranch, a trip of about 8 miles (13 km), or an ACEC takeout at Lower Fourmile Road, a mile further downstream.

== See also ==
- List of lakes in Oregon
