= Langlois, Oregon =

Unincorporated community in the state of Oregon, United States

- Census-designated place
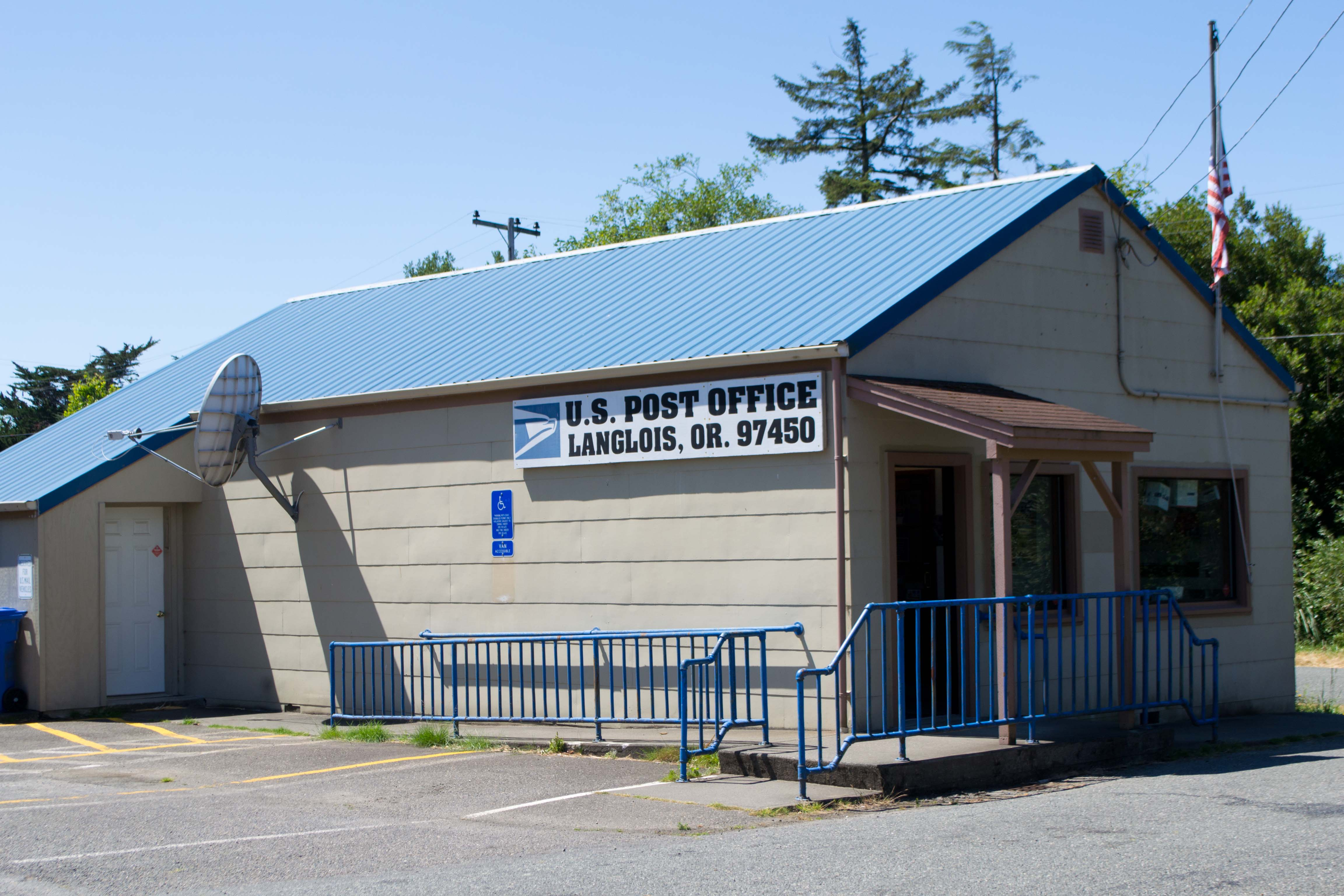
- Langlois post office

- Location within the state of Oregon Langlois (the United States)
- Coordinates: 42°55′33″N 124°27′11″W
- Country: United States
- State: Oregon
- County: Curry

Area
  - Total: 1.42 sq mi (3.69 km^{2})
  - Land: 1.42 sq mi (3.69 km^{2})
  - Water: 0 sq mi (0.00 km^{2})
- Elevation: 66 ft (20 m)

Population (2020)
  - Total: 196
  - Density: 137.4/sq mi (53.05/km^{2})
- Time zone: UTC-8 (Pacific (PST))
  - Summer (DST): UTC-7 (PDT)
- ZIP code: 97450
- Area codes: 458 and 541
- FIPS code: 41-40950
- GNIS feature ID: 2611739

Langlois /ˈlæŋlɪs/ is an unincorporated community and census-designated place in Curry County, Oregon, United States, on the Oregon Coast established in 1881. As of the 2020 census, Langlois had a population of 196. Langlois was once famous for its blue cheese, until the cheese factory burned down in the 1950s. It was never rebuilt.

Langlois was named for William Langlois, an early Oregon pioneer. As phonetically spelled in the 1860 Federal Census, Port Oxford Precint [sic], page 110, the name was pronounced "Langless,” however the modern pronunciation used by the local residents today is “Lang-loyce.” (It rhymes with Joyce.)

The population consists primarily of retirees, with a healthy mix of ranchers and farmers. The logging and fishing industries are also a dominant presence in the community.

Langlois is also home to the Langlois Market, world famous to Hwy 101 road trippers and travelers, known for their hot dogs and house-made mustard, a 30+ year old family recipe.

Langois has a public library and a small US postal service office.

Langlois is located spanning U.S. Route 101, 41 miles (66 km) by road north of Gold Beach. It is 2.3 miles (3.7 km) inland from the Pacific Ocean. Floras Creek, a tributary of the New River, passes through the southern part of the community.

== Demographics ==
Historical population
Census	Pop.	Note	%±
2020	196		—
U.S. Decennial Census

== Notable people ==
- Rick Harrison of Pawn Stars
