= Port of Bandon =

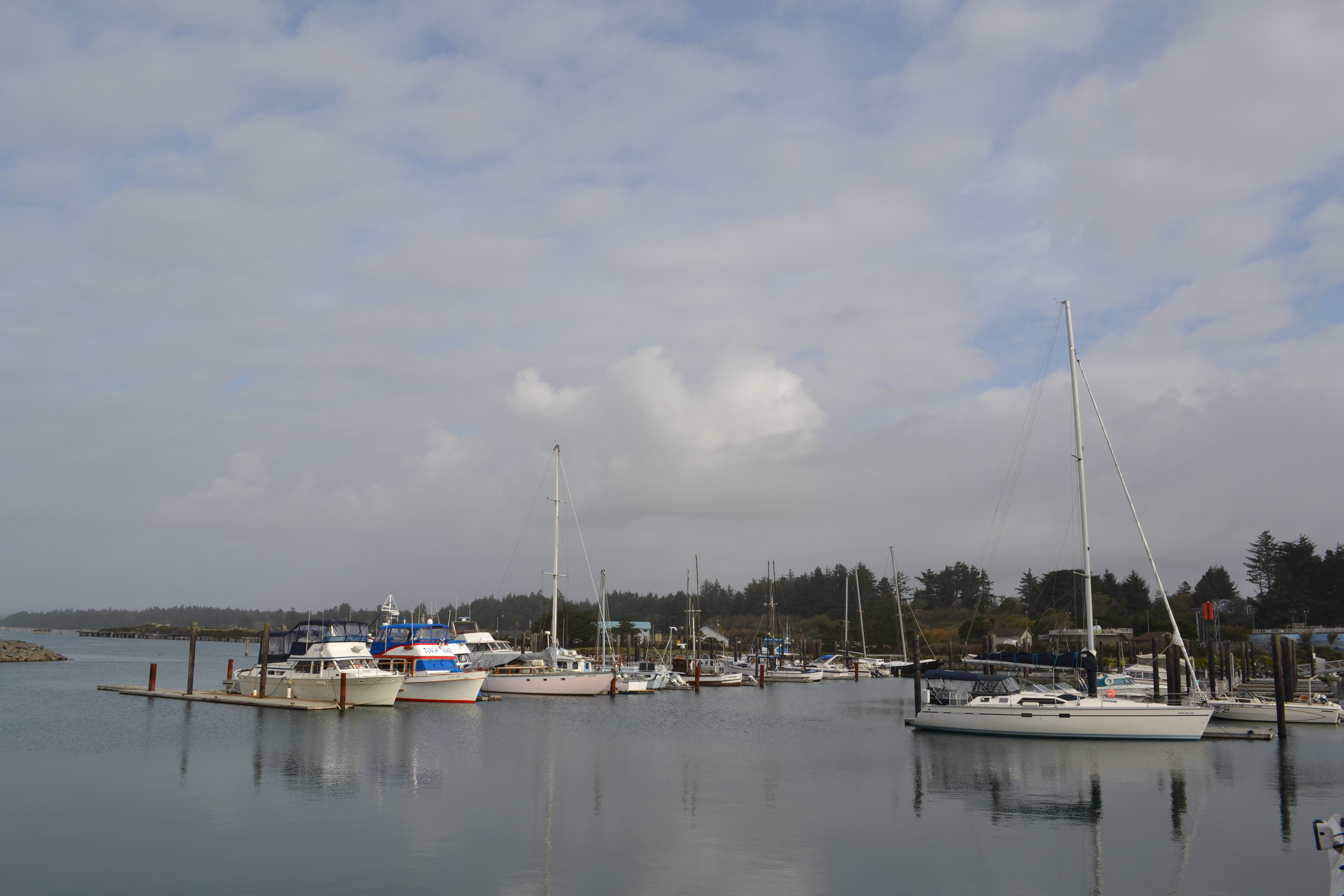

Location
- Country: United States
- Location: Bandon, Oregon
- Coordinates: 43.12113°N 124.41596°W

Details
- General Manager: Jeff Griffin
- Commission: Five Commissioners: Reg Pullen, President; Donny Goddard, Vice President; Wayne Butler, Treasurer; Harv Schubothe; Rick Goche

Statistics
- Website www.portofbandon.com

The Port of Bandon is the port authority for Bandon Harbor in the city of Bandon, Oregon, United States. The port has full marina facilities for boat launching and sport fishing. It also serves as a waypoint stopover for commercial fishing and recreation vessels, and has a scenic boardwalk with a nature pathway and observation areas. The United States Coast Guard operates Search and Rescue Detachment Coquille River in Bandon Harbor in the summer and on halibut season weekend openers in the spring, and is equipped with a 47-foot motor life boat and crew.

== See also ==
- Coquille River
