= Bullards Bridge =

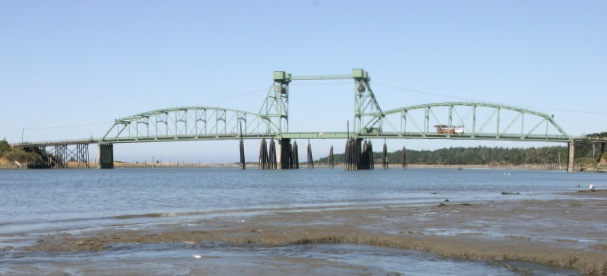
- Coordinates: 43.1471°N 124.3955°W
- Carries: US 101
- Crosses: Coquille River
- Locale: Bandon, Oregon, U.S.
- Maintained by: ODOT
- Preceded by: Ferry

Characteristics
- Design: Vertical-lift bridge with flanking camelback truss spans
- Material: Steel
- Total length: 702 ft (214 m)
- Width: 26 ft (7.9 m)
- Clearance above: Approx. 17 feet (5.2 m) (on the roadway deck)
- Clearance below: 81 feet (25 m) fully open; 31 feet (9.4 m) closed

History
- Construction start: 1952
- Opened: 1954

Statistics
- Daily traffic: 8,282 (2007)

Location
- Interactive map of Bullards Bridge

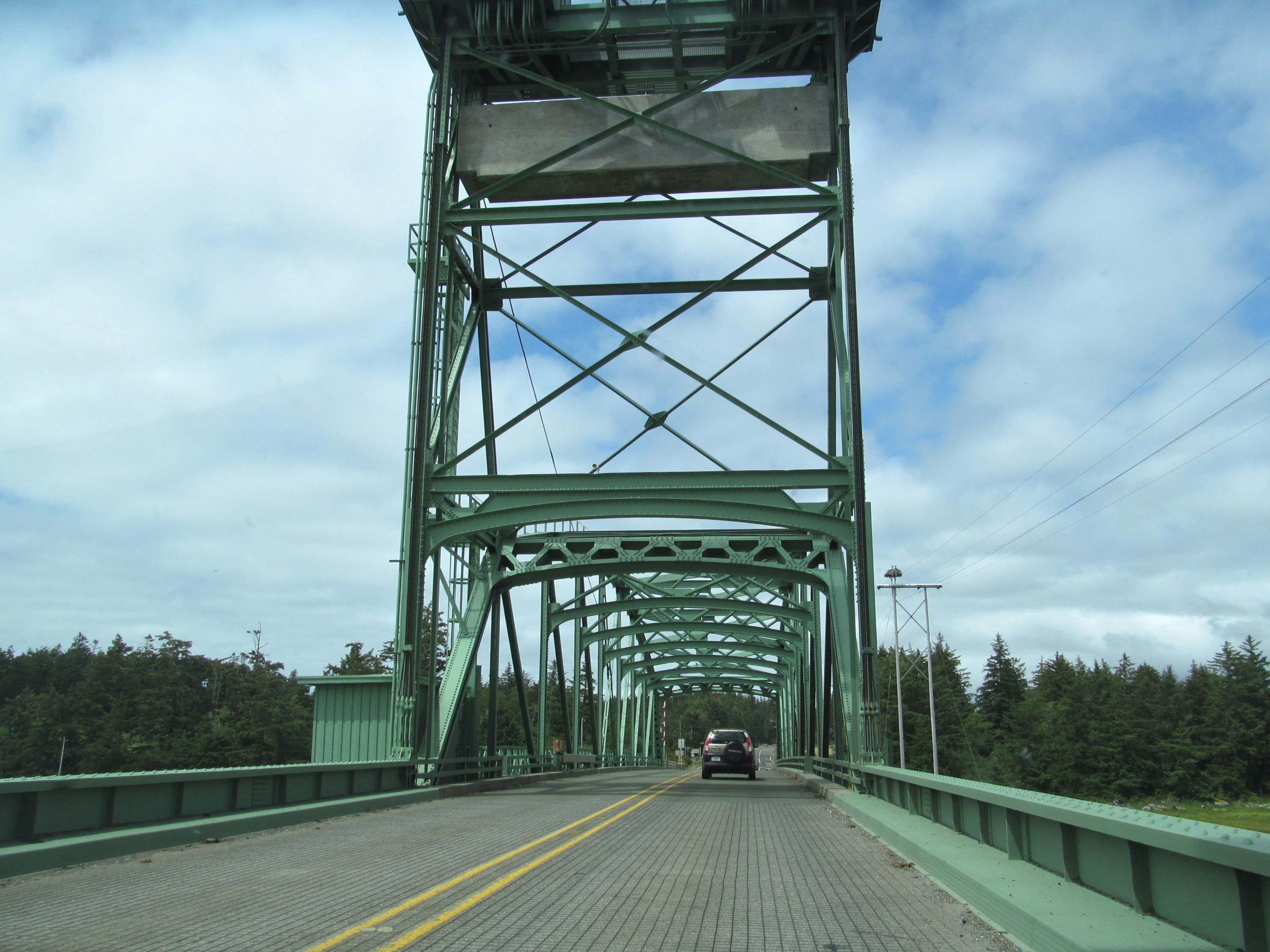
View from the lift span, looking towards the northern truss span

The Bullards Bridge (or simply Bullards Bridge) is a vertical-lift bridge that spans the Coquille River near where the river empties into the Pacific Ocean, just north of Bandon, Oregon, United States. One of only two vertical-lift bridges on the Oregon Coast Highway (U.S. Route 101), it was completed in 1954. The lift span is flanked by two camelback truss spans. It is located immediately east of Bullards Beach State Park.

The bridge was built to replace Bullards Ferry, a ferry service whose slip was located about 80 feet (24 m) upstream from the bridge that replaced it. The name originates with the Bullard family, who were among the early settlers in the area. The Oregon Highway Commission awarded a contract for construction of the bridge and a 0.49-mile (0.79 km) new section of highway in October 1952. The completed bridge was dedicated on September 20, 1954.

The overhead clearance for vehicles on the bridge deck originally was between 14 feet 10 inches (4.52 m) and 15 feet 2 inches (4.62 m), but after multiple instances of tall trucks striking the bridge, work was undertaken in 2006–07 to move certain cross pieces in order to increase the vertical clearance on the roadway by about 2 feet.

Average daily traffic on the bridge was about 6,000 vehicles in 2004, but had grown to about 8,300 by 2007.

In late 2009, the Oregon Department of Transportation was planning a $3.4 million rehabilitation of the Bullards Bridge for 2010–11. The bridge's draw span is very rarely opened now; as of 2009, it had not been raised for marine traffic in seven years, being operated only for annual test openings for maintenance.

== See also ==
- List of bridges on U.S. Route 101 in Oregon
