= Humbug Mountain =

Mountain in the U.S. state of Oregon

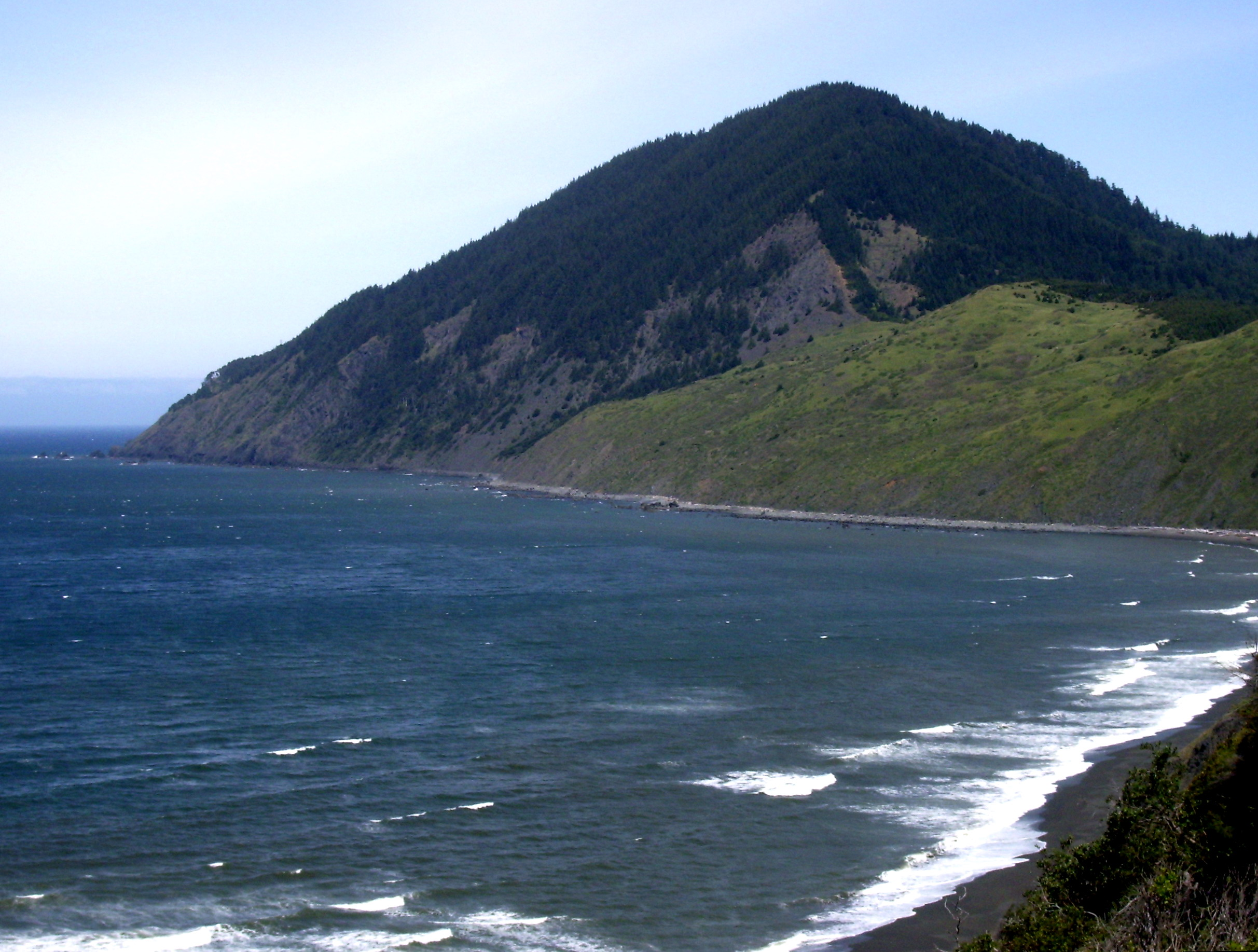
- Humbug Mountain, viewed from the south

Highest point
- Elevation: 1,765 ft (538 m) NAVD 88
- Prominence: 1,561 ft (476 m)
- Coordinates: 42°40′43″N 124°26′09″W

Geography
- Location within Oregon
- Location: Curry County, Oregon, U.S.
- Parent range: Klamath Mountains
- Topo map: USGS Port Orford

Climbing
- Easiest route: Hike

Humbug Mountain is one of the highest mountains in the U.S. state of Oregon to rise directly from the Pacific Ocean. It lies on the state's southern coast, about 6 miles (10 km) south of Port Orford and 21 miles (34 km) north of Gold Beach. The mountain is completely within Humbug Mountain State Park, and U.S. Route 101 passes by its northern base. Its slopes feature an old-growth temperate rainforest. Two trails run from the state park campground to the mountain's summit, one 1.5 miles (2.4 km) long, the other 2 miles (3.2 km) long. Both are part of the much longer Oregon Coast Trail. The area is popular with hikers, campers, cyclists, and whale watchers although biking and camping on the mountain itself are prohibited.

== Geology ==
Humbug Mountain was created about 130 million years ago, in the early Cretaceous period. It was formed when islands in the Klamath microcontinent collided, uplifting primordial mountains composed of mostly sandstone. Ancient rivers eroded these mountains, and the sediment and sandstone was deposited on the seashore. Then, the microcontinent collided with the North American continent, uplifting Humbug Mountain in the process. Near the summit, rock outcrops of granite and sandstone can still be found.

The mountain now stands 1,756 feet (535 m) above sea level, and is one of the highest mountains in Oregon to rise directly from the ocean. It is considered a headland.

== History ==
Humbug Mountain was originally known as Me-tus by the indigenous Tututni people. When American settlers located the mountain, they initially named it Sugarloaf Mountain. In 1851 it began to be called Tichenor's Humbug when an exploring party sent by Captain William V. Tichenor, founder of Port Orford, got lost and headed north of the port instead of south. Tichenor stated that the name was chosen "to palliate their gross failure." Since that time, Tichenor's Humbug came to be known as Humbug Mountain. The mountain has also been called Mount Franklin.

In 1934 the Civilian Conservation Corps built the first trail to the summit, however, it was destroyed in the 1962 Columbus Day Storm. An alternate trail was used until the original was reopened in 1993.

== Flora and fauna ==
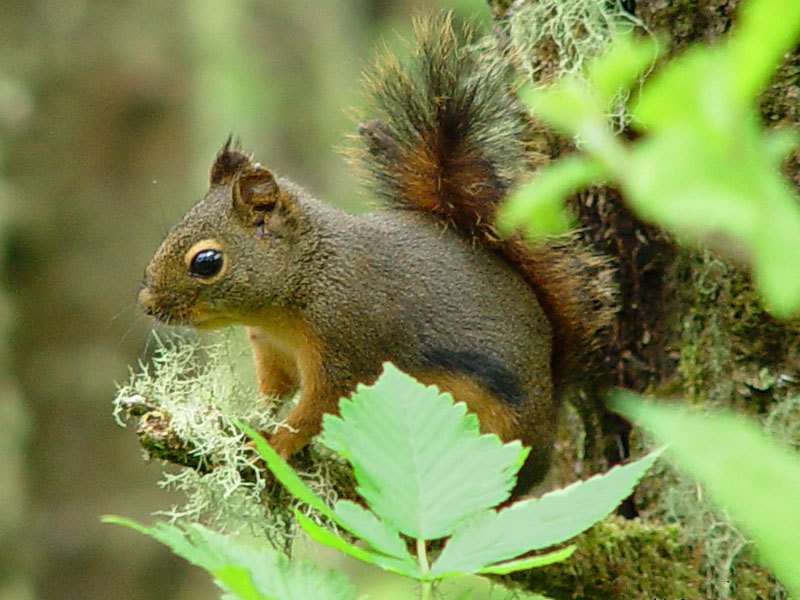
Douglas squirrels can be found on the mountain.

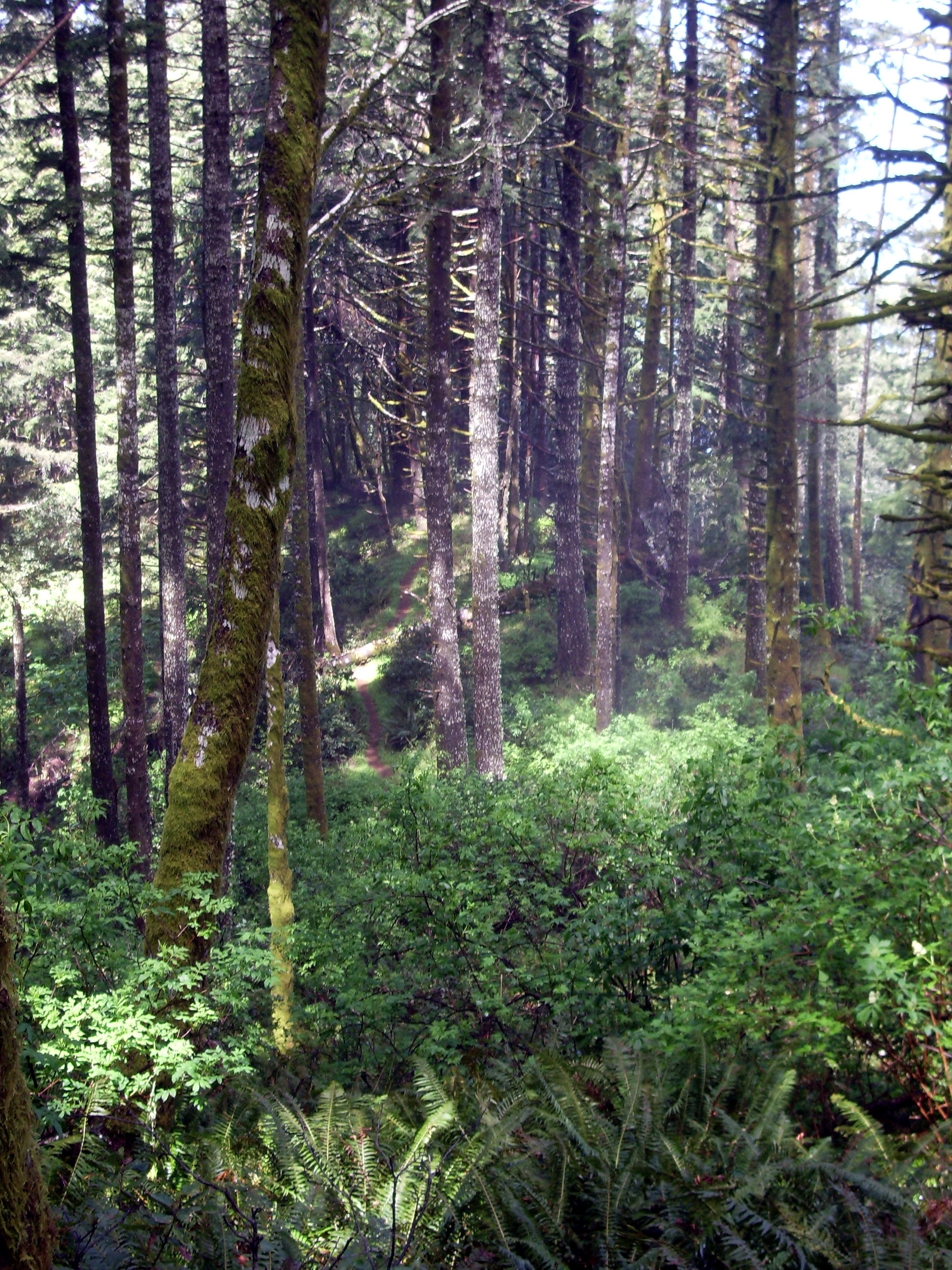
Forest on the west side of the mountain

Many types of plants inhabit Humbug Mountain. The most common types of trees include tanoak, Douglas fir, big-leaf maple, Port Orford cedar, and Oregon myrtle. Spruce, alder, and western red cedar can also be found. Smaller plants such as maidenhair ferns, wild rhododendrons, and vanilla leaf are abundant in the area. Wildflowers such as Columbia lilies, trilliums, and bleeding hearts grow in the spring. Currant, elderberries, blackberries, thimbleberries, huckleberries, and salmonberries are some of the many berries that grow on the mountain.

Birds such as varied thrushes and chickadees live on Humbug Mountain. Douglas squirrels and black-tailed deer are among the numerous mammals that inhabit the mountain.

There are many tide pools in the intertidal zone at the base of the mountain. Organisms such as jellyfish, littleneck clams, sunflower starfish, and many others can be found in these pools. Gray whales can sometimes be seen migrating along the coast, and more rarely, humpback whales are spotted.

== Trails ==
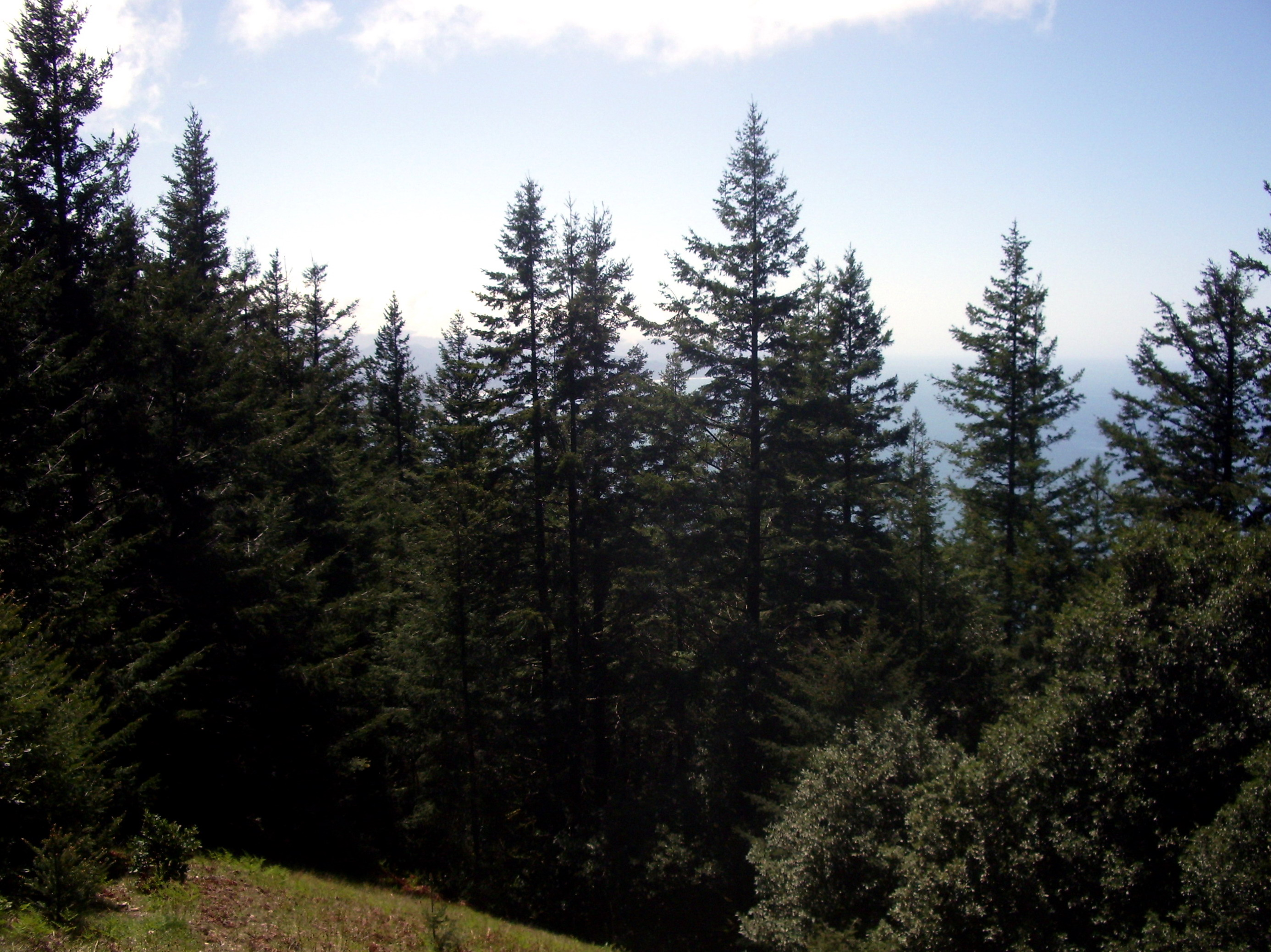
The summit of Humbug Mountain

Many trails have been built on Humbug Mountain. The Humbug Mountain Trail climbs 1,730 feet (530 m) to the summit. The trailhead is located in the campground at Humbug Mountain State Park. After going through a tunnel under U.S. Route 101, the trail leads through the old-growth temperate rainforest on the mountain. It has several switchbacks. The trail then forks about 1 mile (1.6 km) in. The trail to the west was originally built in 1934 by the Civilian Conservation Corps, but was washed out in the Columbus Day Storm of 1962. An alternate trail was built, which now forms a loop with the original trail. The original trail was rebuilt in 1993. Overall, the original trail is approximately 1.5 miles (2.4 km) long, while the alternate trail is 2 miles (3.2 km) long, for a round trip of 5.5 miles (8.9 km). Both trails are part of the much longer Oregon Coast Trail.

Another trail leads from the campground, under the highway, to a 4-mile (6.4 km) long beach on the north side of the mountain.

A fourth trail, named Recreation Trail, follows the path of the Old Coast Highway. It is approximately 2.6 miles (4.2 km) long, and crosses nearby Brush Creek seventeen times. The trail has many views of the Pacific Ocean. It eventually merges with U.S. Route 101.

== Recreation ==
Nature study, wildlife viewing, camping, and whale watching are popular activities around the mountain. Hiking and cycling are also very popular on the trails in the area. Beachcombers, windsurfers, and scuba divers can be found on the beach and in the deep water near the mountain.

Humbug Mountain State Park, which includes all of Humbug Mountain, features a campground with over 100 campsites. The campground is located between Brush Creek and the beach. It has amenities such as showers, flush toilets, a hiker/biker camp, and an amphitheater. There are also picnic tables in the day-use section, 1 mile (1.6 km) south of the main campground.
