= West Coast Game Park Safari =

West Coast Game Park
- Interactive map of West Coast Game Park
- 43.009957°N 124.415284°W
- Date opened: 1968
- Date closed: 2025
- Location: 46914 Highway 101; Bandon, Oregon, United States
- Land area: 21 acres (8.5 ha)
- Owner: Bob Tenney
- Website: westcoastgameparksafari.com

The West Coast Game Park Safari was a walk-through safari park in Bandon, Oregon, United States. It opened in 1968, and closed in 2025 following investigation into criminal activities.

The park was a petting zoo and captive breeding program, including endangered species such as the snow leopard. They provided big cats to other parks and zoos. Animals at the facility included snow leopards, African lions, Bengal tigers, emu, capybara, and cougars.

West Coast Game Park Safari was not AZA Accredited. They were a roadside zoo which let the public interact with big cats, similar to those featured on the Tiger King series. They had multiple USDA violations in 2015 & 2016, including 4 critical violations in their June 22, 2016 inspection report. The critical violations included mishandling adult & baby animals, as well as shooting 2 of their own bears. During one of the visits by USDA, a dead tiger was found in a food container. In 2020 they were listed on PETA's Highway Hellholes: Roadside Zoos on the Blacklist.

In 1985, Bob Tenney, the park owner, stated the game park received 60,000 visitors per year.

Two American black bears from the game park were bought in 2001 and 2002 by Baylor University, whose mascot is the Baylor Bears.

On May 18, 2021, West Coast Game Park Safari was featured in the Showcase on The Price Is Right.

In May 2025, a criminal investigation into West Coast Game Safari began, focusing on alleged violations related to animal welfare, permitting, licensing, and business practices. Oregon State Police served search warrants and 44 guns, 80 grams of methamphetamine and about $1.6 million in "cash, cashier’s checks, bonds, and certificates" were found at the safari park. 310 animals were also seized. After these items were found, the owner Brian Tenney was arrested and charged with methamphetamine possession, manufacturing and attempted distribution. He pleaded guilty to 47 criminal charges in April 2026. Charges are mostly related to animal neglect.

== See also ==
- Wildlife Safari, a safari park in Winston, Oregon
