= Randal O'Toole =

American city planning commentator

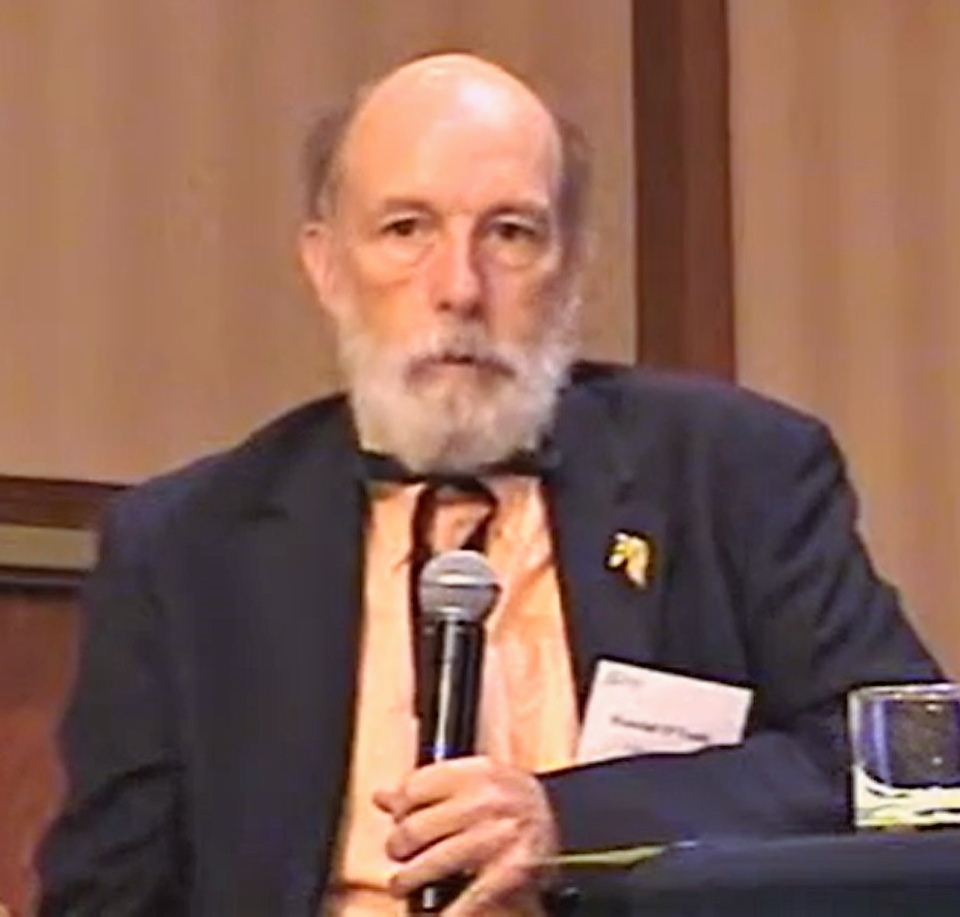
- O'Toole speaking at the Sensible Land-Use Coalition in Minneapolis in 2014
- Born: 1952 (age 73–74)
- Education: University of Oregon (BS)
- Occupation: Public policy analyst

Randal O'Toole (born 1952) is an American public policy analyst. The majority of O'Toole's work has focused on public lands, land-use regulation, and transportation, particularly light rail. He is a strong opponent of passenger rail and proposals to build such systems.

He had been associated with the Cato Institute as an adjunct scholar since 1995 and a senior fellow from 2007 to 2021. O'Toole was the McCluskey Visiting Fellow for Conservation at Yale University in 1998 and has served as a visiting scholar at the University of California, Berkeley (1999) and Utah State University (2000). O'Toole studied economics at the University of Oregon at the graduate level for three years but did not receive a degree, he also holds a B.S. Degree in forest management and geology from the University of Oregon. O'Toole's private consultancy is known as the Thoreau Institute.

O'Toole usually refers to himself as "The Antiplanner". He was fired by the Cato Institute in December 2021.

== Work ==
Early in his career, O'Toole worked with environmental groups to oppose the United States Forest Service's subsidized sales of public forest timber to the timber industry. His book Reforming the Forest Service built on his experience during this effort, and proposed a number of free-market solutions to management of U.S. public land and timber. He has written analyses of the usage and development plans of a number of U.S. national forests, working with state environmental agencies and other groups.

In the 1990s, O'Toole emerged as an outspoken critic of New Urbanist design and smart growth strategies after learning in 1995 of a county plan to rezone his neighborhood to allow higher density and mixed use development. O'Toole contends that these development strategies—in which regulatory measures and tax incentives are employed to encourage denser development, more efficient land use, and greater use of public transportation—ignore the desires and preferences of most housing consumers and ultimately waste public funds. He has campaigned against smart growth policies and light rail systems in several U.S. states as well as in Winnipeg, Manitoba, and Ottawa, Ontario.

His 2001 book, The Vanishing Automobile and Other Urban Myths, was written as a detailed critique of these styles of planning. He continues to advocate for free market solutions to urban planning and design in his writing and teaching.

O'Toole has written four books published by the Cato Institute. The Best-Laid Plans argues that long-range comprehensive government planning necessarily relies on fads and fails to account for current and future public desires and needs. Gridlock looks at the history of transportation in America and argues that the future is in autonomous personal vehicles, not rail transit or high-speed rail. American Nightmare examines the history of housing in America and argues that zoning and, more recently, growth-management planning represents efforts by the middle- and upper-classes to separate themselves from the working class. Romance of the Rails looks at the history of urban and intercity rail transit in the United States to argue that they once worked but no longer work today.

== Personal life ==
He moved from Bandon, Oregon to Camp Sherman, Oregon, where he runs the "Thoreau Institute."

While critical of government subsidies to all forms of transportation, O'Toole is a fan of passenger trains and an amateur rail historian. He currently runs a web site, Streamliner Memories, to share scanned copies of his personal library of railroadiana. However, O'Toole believes trains are merely historical and too outdated to ever be useful after the invention of airplanes.

== Selected publications ==
=== Urban planning ===
- The Vanishing Automobile and Other Urban Myths (Thoreau Institute, 2001) ISBN 0-9706439-0-X
- "A Desire Named Streetcar: How Federal Subsidies Encourage Wasteful Local Transit Systems", Policy Analysis 559: 1–16.
- The Best-Laid Plans (Cato Institute 2007) ISBN 978-1933995076
- Gridlock: Why We're Stuck in Traffic and What to Do About It (Cato Institute 2010) ISBN 978-1935308232
- American Nightmare: How Government Undermines the Dream of Homeownership (Cato Institute 2012) ISBN 978-1937184896.

=== Forestry ===
- Reforming the Forest Service (Island Press, 1988) ISBN 0-933280-49-1
- The Citizens' Guide to the Forest Service Budget (self-published/Thoreau Institute)
- The Citizens' Guide to the Timber Industry (self-published/Thoreau Institute)

=== Railroad History ===
- O'Toole, Randal. "Mr. Budd's Historical Expeditions" (PDF). Minnesota History.
- Romance of the Rails: Why the Passenger Trains We Love Are Not the Transportation We Need (Cato Institute 2018) ISBN 978-1944424947.
