= Face Rock State Scenic Viewpoint =

State park in Oregon, United States

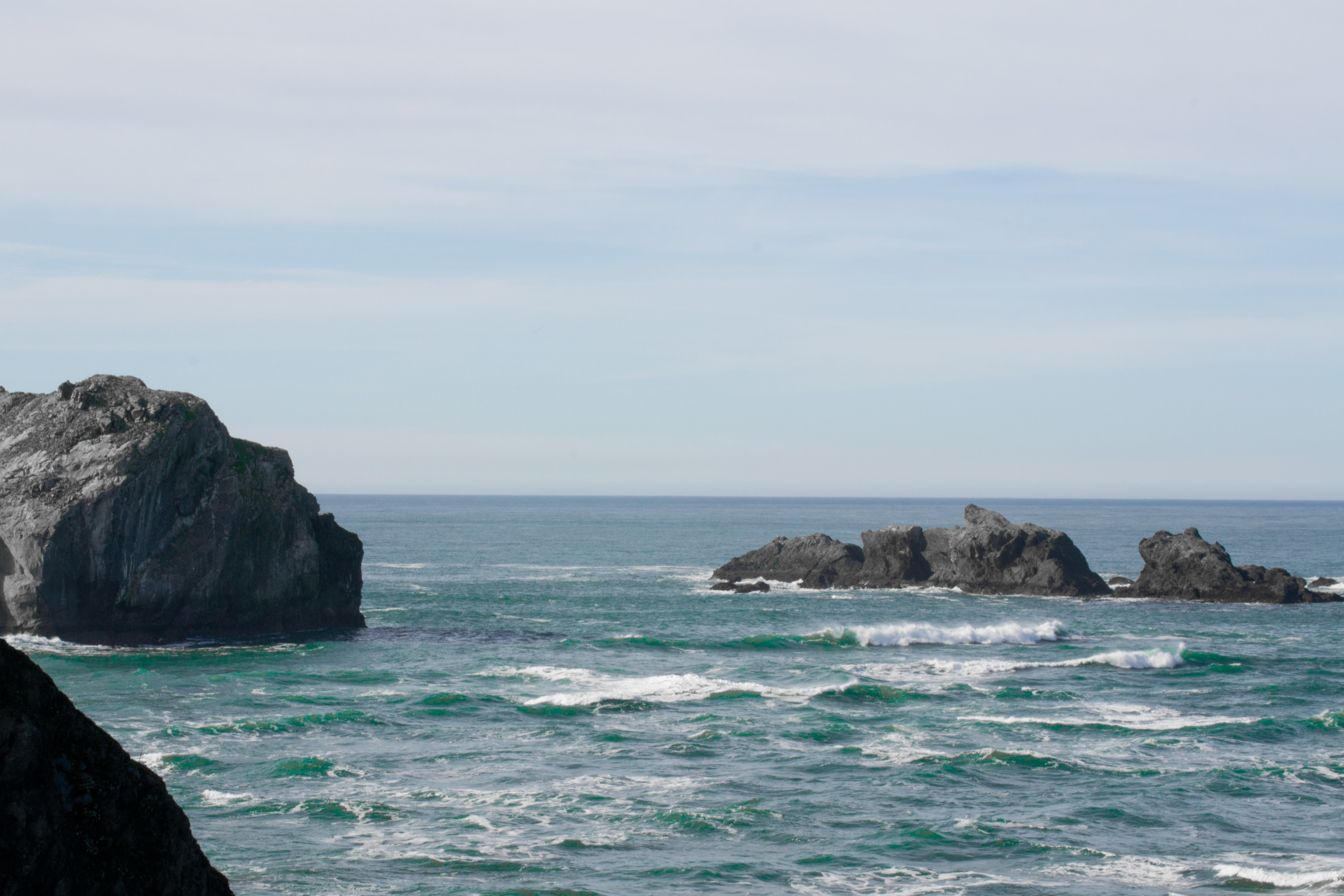
- The viewpoint overlooks Face Rock, left

- Location within Oregon Location within the United States
- Type: Public, state
- Location: Coos County, Oregon
- Nearest city: Bandon
- Coordinates: 43°06′24″N 124°26′05″W
- Area: 14.84 acres (6.01 ha)
- Created: 1934
- Operator: Oregon Parks and Recreation Department
- Visitors: About 250,000 a year
- Open: Year-round

Face Rock State Scenic Viewpoint is a state park in Bandon, Oregon, United States, administered by the Oregon Parks and Recreation Department. The rocks and tidal flats adjacent to the park form part of the Oregon Islands National Wildlife Refuge. More than 300 species of birds frequent the area.

The viewpoint's name is derived from the off-shore rock island which has the likeness of a human face and is part of a Native American legend.

The state acquired land over time for the 15-acre (6 ha) park, originally called Bandon Ocean Wayside. The initial land was a gift in 1934; the state bought additional acreage in 1961.

Amenities include picnic tables, restrooms, a viewing scope, and a stairway and trail to the beach. Slightly north of Face Rock is Coquille Point, with its own parking area, benches, and hiking trail within the only mainland fraction of the Oregon Islands National Wildlife Refuge.

== See also ==
- List of Oregon state parks
