= Humbug Mountain State Park =

State park in Oregon, United States

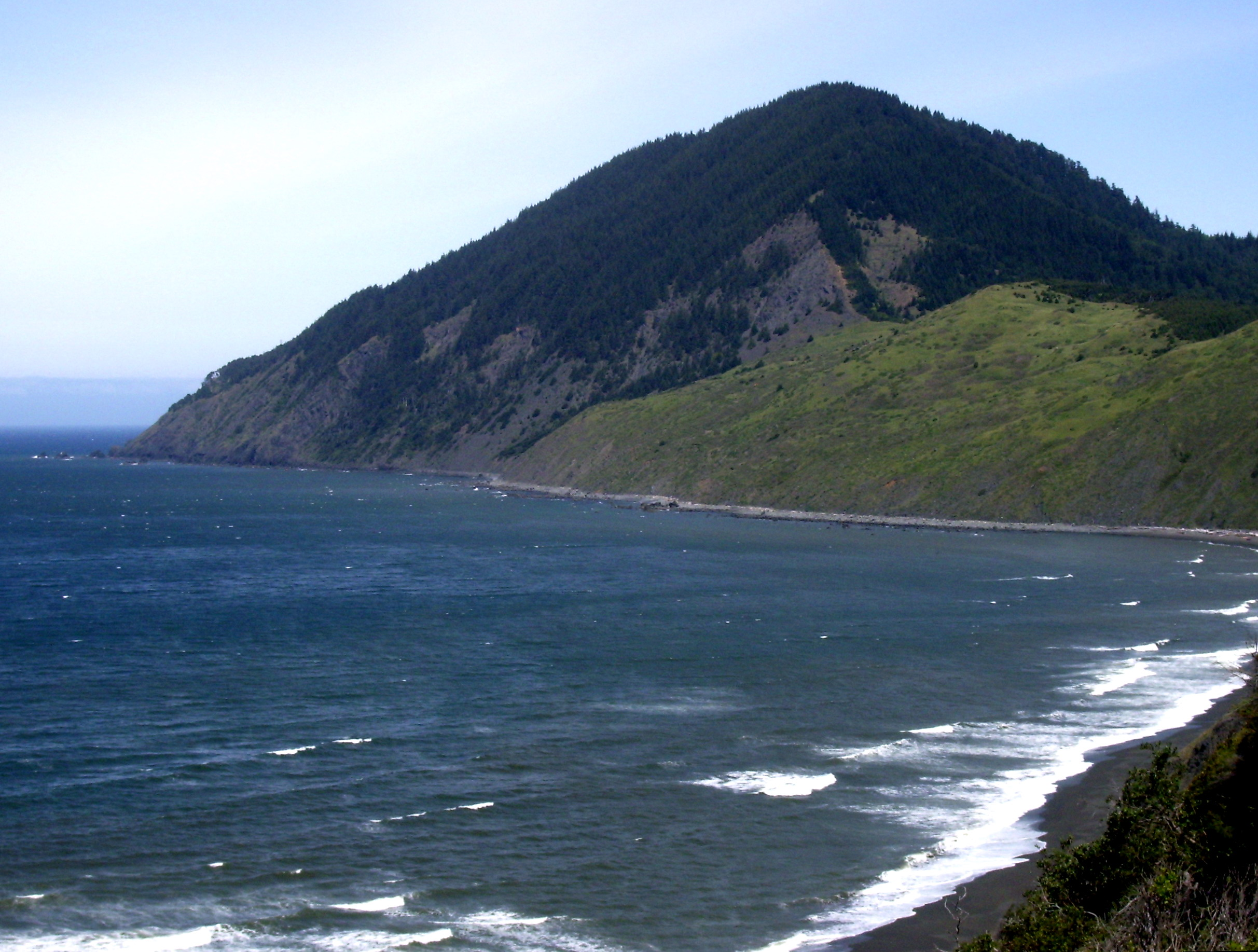
- Humbug Mountain from the south coastline

- Location within Oregon Location within the United States
- Type: Public, state
- Location: Curry County, Oregon
- Nearest city: Port Orford
- Coordinates: 42°41′11″N 124°26′10″W
- Area: 1,842 acres (745 ha)
- Operator: Oregon Parks and Recreation Department

Humbug Mountain State Park is a state park located on the Oregon coast. It is administered by the Oregon Parks and Recreation Department. The park can be accessed via the US Route 101, 6 miles (10 km) south of Port Orford, and 28 miles (45 km) north of Gold Beach. It covers 1,842 acres (7.45 km^{2}) of land around 1,759-foot (536 m) Humbug Mountain, one of the tallest headlands on the Oregon coast.

== See also ==
- List of Oregon state parks
