= Bullards Beach State Park =

State park in Oregon, United States

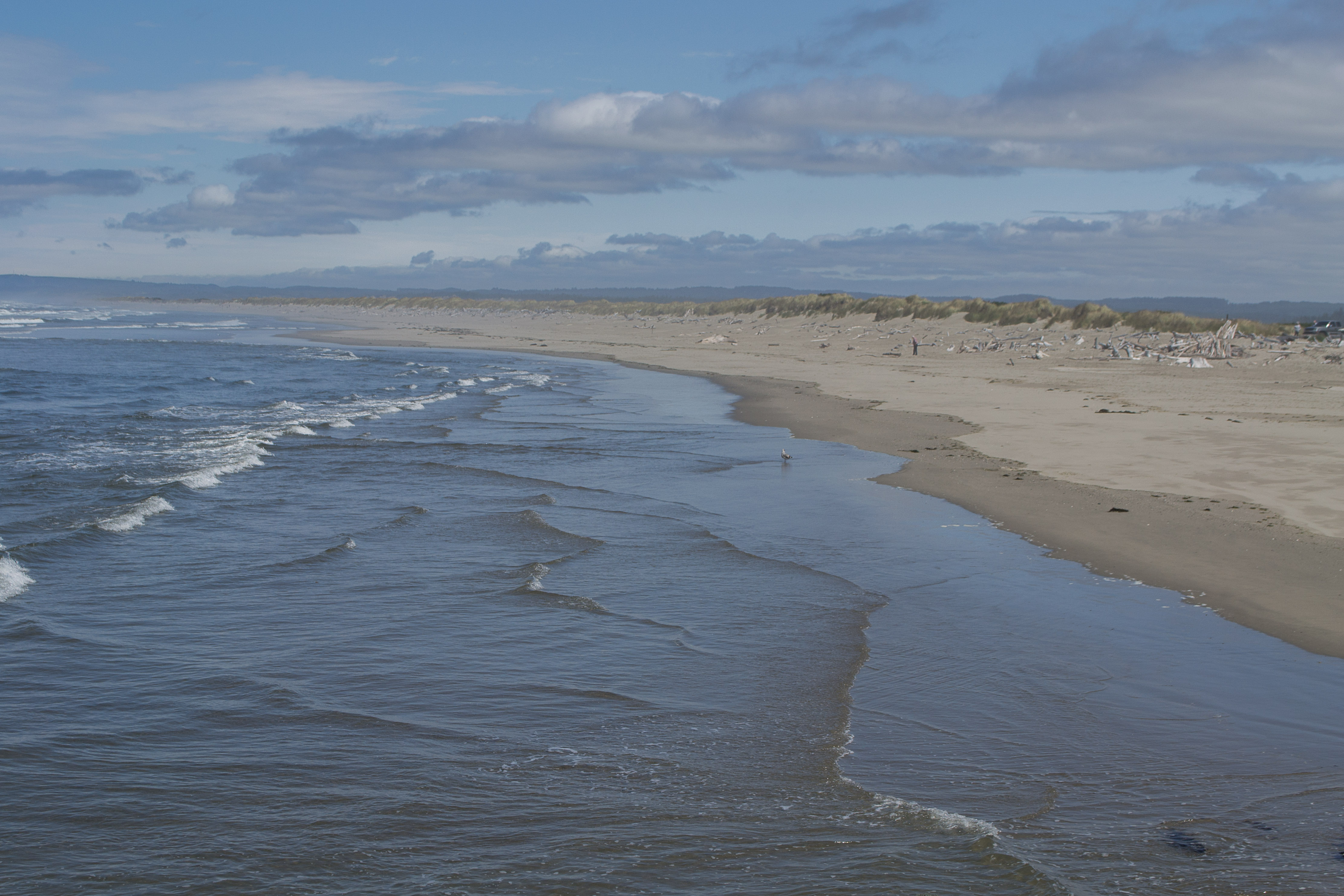
- A view of the park beach from the North Jetty

- Location within Oregon Location within the United States
- Interactive map of Bullards Beach State Park
- Type: Public, state
- Location: Coos County, Oregon
- Nearest city: Bandon
- Coordinates: 43°09′22″N 124°24′36″W
- Operator: Oregon Parks and Recreation Department

Bullards Beach State Park is a state park in the U.S. state of Oregon, administered by the Oregon Parks and Recreation Department.

The park was acquired between 1962 and 1985 by purchase from various owners, including the U. S. Bureau of Land Management. The Coquille River Lighthouse, built by the U. S. Coast Guard in 1896 and operated until 1939, sits at the confluence of the river and ocean. The Bullard family were early settlers in the Bandon area. Robert Bullard established a store and post office at the mouth of the Coquille River and operated a ferry, which crossed the river near the present bridge on U.S. 101.

== See also ==
- List of Oregon state parks
- Bullards Bridge
