= Seal Rock State Recreation Site =

State park in Oregon, United States

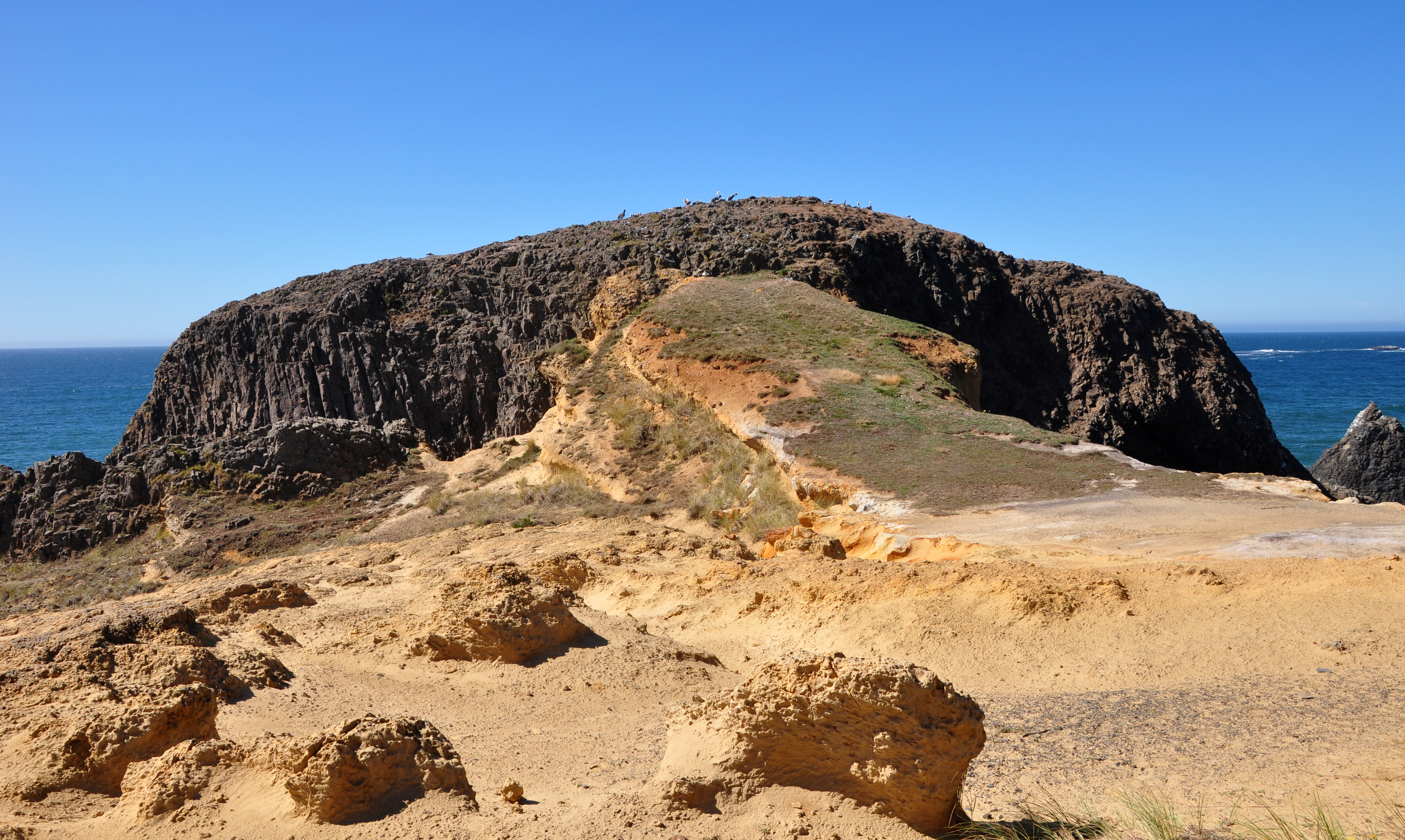
- Oregon State Parks

- Location within Oregon Location within the United States
- Type: Public, state
- Location: Lincoln County, Oregon
- Nearest city: Waldport
- Coordinates: 44°29′50″N 124°04′59″W
- Operator: Oregon Parks and Recreation Department

Seal Rock State Recreation Site is a state park in the U.S. state of Oregon, administered by the Oregon Parks and Recreation Department.

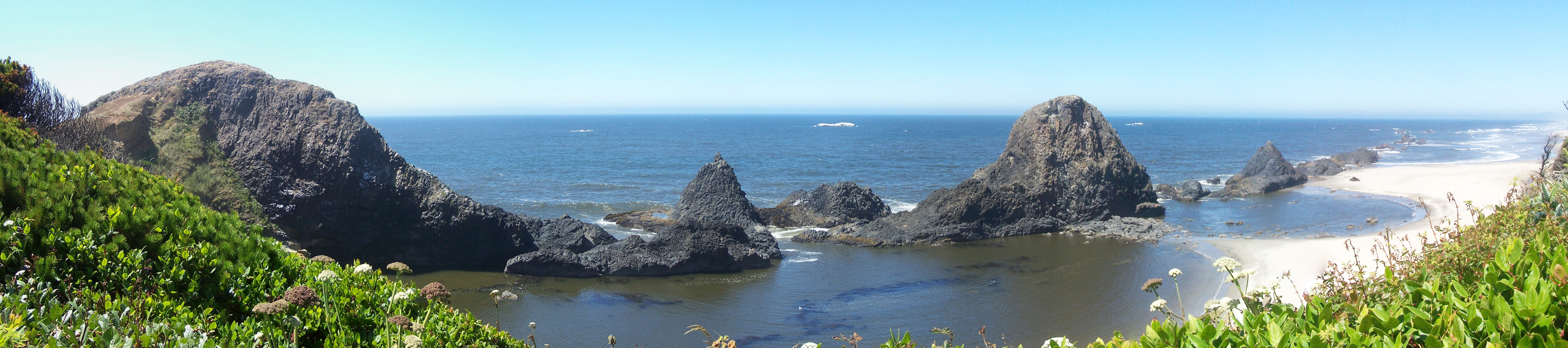
Panorama of the view looking north from Seal Rock State Recreation Site

== See also ==
- List of Oregon state parks
