= Bandon, Oregon =

City in Coos County, Oregon

- City
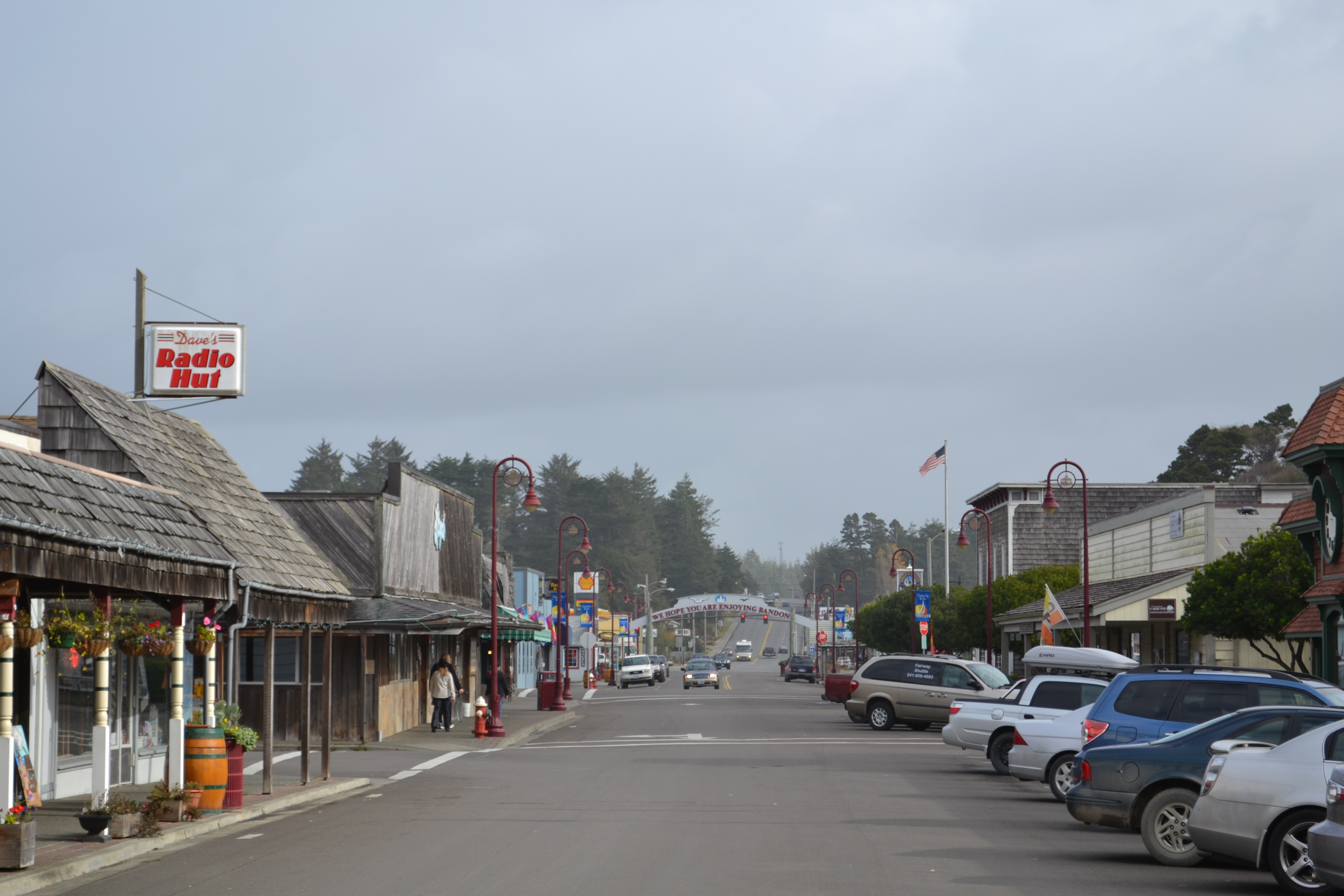
- Bandon Historic District

- Location in Oregon
- Coordinates: 43°7′N 124°25′W
- Country: United States
- State: Oregon
- County: Coos
- Incorporated: 1891

Government
  - Mayor: Mary Schamehorn

Area
  - Total: 3.15 sq mi (8.15 km^{2})
  - Land: 2.76 sq mi (7.15 km^{2})
  - Water: 0.39 sq mi (1.00 km^{2})
- Elevation: 72 ft (22 m)

Population (2020)
  - Total: 3,321
  - Density: 1,203/sq mi (464.6/km^{2})
- Time zone: UTC-8 (Pacific)
  - Summer (DST): UTC-7 (Pacific)
- ZIP code: 97411
- Area code: 541
- FIPS code: 41-03800
- GNIS feature ID: 2409782
- Website: www.bandon-or.gov

Bandon (/ˈbændən/) is a city in Coos County, Oregon, United States, located on the south side of the mouth of the Coquille River. The community was named by George Bennett, an Irish immigrant who settled in the area in 1873 and named the town after his hometown of Bandon, County Cork in Ireland.

The population was 3,066 at the 2010 census and grew to 3,321 by the 2020 census.

== History ==
Before 1850, the Coquille Indians lived in the area. Then in 1851, gold was discovered at nearby Whiskey Run Beach by French Canadian trappers, though the gold rush did not have much of an impact on the area. In 1852, Henry Baldwin, from County Cork, Ireland, was shipwrecked on the Coos Bay bar and walked into this area. The first permanent European settlers came in 1853 and established the present town site. In 1856, conflicts in the area arose and Indigenous Americans were sent to the Siletz Reservation. In 1859, the boat Twin Sisters sailed into the Coquille River and opened the outlet for all inland produce and resources.

Bandon was founded by the Irish peer George Bennett in 1873. George Bennett, his sons Joseph and George, and George Sealey came from Bandon, Ireland. The following year the town's previous name of Averille was changed to Bandon after the namesake town in Ireland. The next year, Joseph Williams and his three sons arrived, also from Bandon, Ireland. In 1877, the post office was established. In 1880, cheese making began. That same year, Congress appropriated money to build the jetty. In 1883, the first sawmill, school house, and Catholic church were built. In 1884, the U.S. Army Corps of Engineers began construction on the jetty.

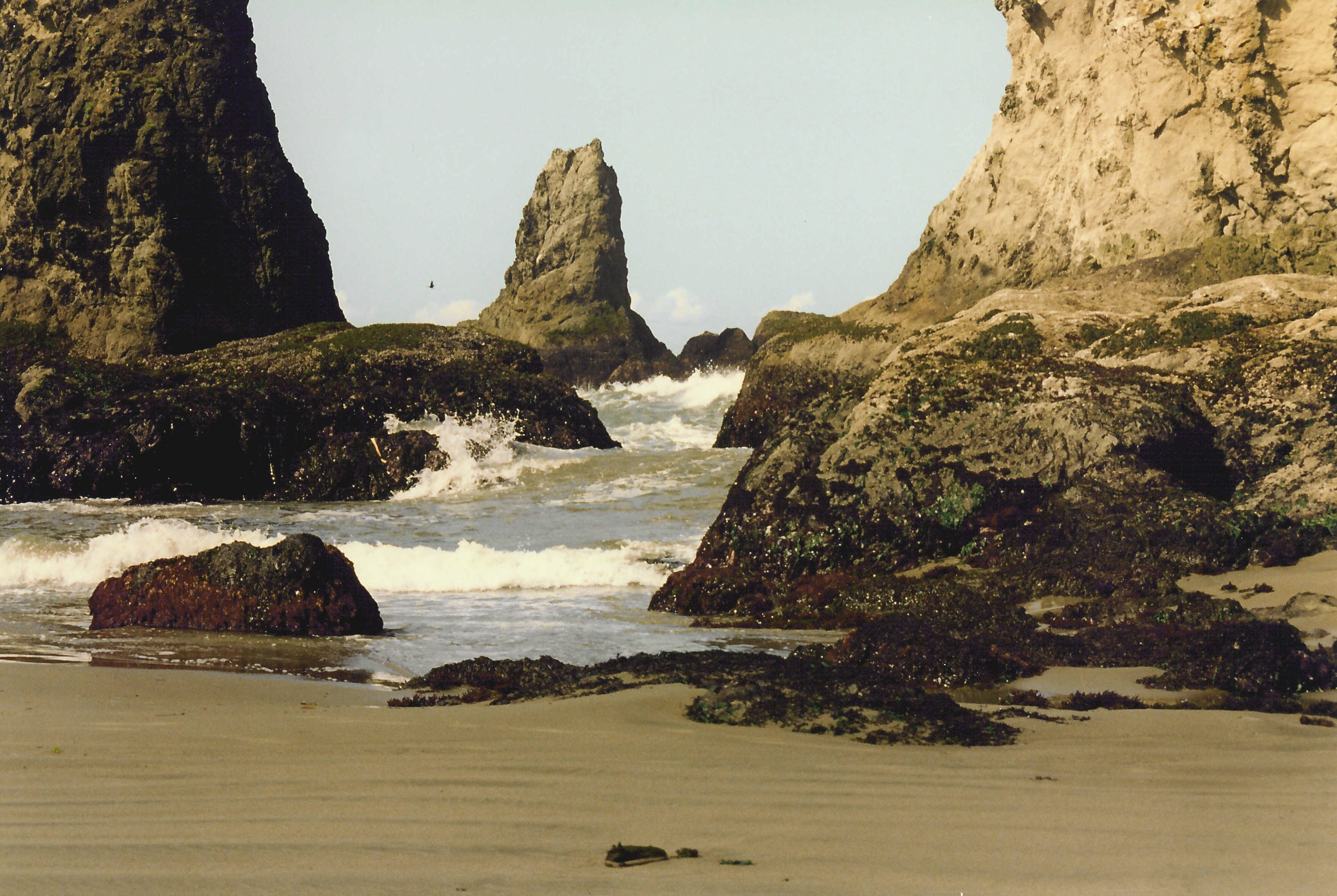
Rock formations along the coast in Bandon (1994)

George Bennett also introduced gorse (Ulex europaeus) into the local area, which in the following decades went wild and became a nuisance in both the town and in the neighboring countryside. Gorse, a spiny plant, grows so thickly a person cannot walk through it. It is also a very oily plant, which easily catches fire.

Cranberries have been grown in Bandon since 1885, when Charles McFarlin planted vines he brought from Massachusetts. McFarlin had originally come to pan for gold in California. He did not make his fortune, or even a living, so he turned to what he knew best. He brought vines from Cape Cod and planted them in the state's first cranberry bog near Hauser. This bog produced cranberries for eight decades. His variety adapted to growing conditions on the west coast. The variety was named McFarlin in his honor and was the principal variety grown on the west coast until overtaken by the Stevens variety. Bandon is also the location of the first cranberry bogs to be wet harvested, which is done by building dikes around the bogs then flooding them.

In 2010, Bandon was named one of the "Coolest Small Towns in America" by BudgetTravel.

=== Fire ===
On September 26, 1936, a fire burned several miles of forest east of town. But a sudden shift in the wind drove the flames swiftly westward. Ignited by the forest fire, the town's abundant gorse became engulfed in flames, Bandon resident D.H. Woomer told The Coos Bay Times. Bandon's entire commercial district was destroyed. The total loss stated at the time was $3 million USD, with 11 fatalities.

Ironically, the gorse was first introduced to the Oregon Coast by the founder of Bandon, Lord George Bennett, from his native Ireland.

Firefighters found that burning gorse reacted to having water squirted on it like a kitchen grease fire—it simply spread burning gobs of gorse everywhere. Stewart Holbrook described this conflagration in his essay "The Gorse of Bandon."

Part of the commercial district had been erected on wooden pilings jutting out over the Coquille River not far from the South Jetty, accommodating river traffic at the merchants' doors. After the 1936 fire, when Bandon began to be rebuilt, the new perimeter of the business district did not extend beyond the available land.

There is still gorse in Bandon today, but municipal codes strictly regulate how high and thick it may be allowed to get.

== Geography ==
According to the United States Census Bureau, the city has a total area of 3.15 square miles (8.16 km^{2}), of which, 2.77 square miles (7.17 km^{2}) is land and 0.38 square miles (0.98 km^{2}) is water.

=== Climate ===
Bandon, Oregon

Climate chart (precipitation, max. and min. temperature)
J	F	M	A	M	J	J	A	S	O	N	D
9.3 55 40	7.2 56 40	7.4 56 41	5.2 58 43	3 62 47	1.5 65 50	0.4 68 53	0.5 69 53	1.4 68 50	4 64 46	8.2 58 43	9.8 55 40
- █ Average max. and min. temperatures in °F
- █ Precipitation totals in inches
Metric conversion
J	F	M	A	M	J	J	A	S	O	N	D
236 13 4	183 13 4	188 13 5	132 14 6	76 17 8	38 18 10	10 20 12	13 21 12	36 20 10	102 18 8	208 14 6	249 13 4
- █ Average max. and min. temperatures in °C
- █ Precipitation totals in mm

Located at the northern end of the Brookings banana belt, Bandon has a warm-summer Mediterranean climate (Köppen Csb), making it drier, sunnier and warmer than most other locations on the Oregon coast. Rain and overcast conditions are common in the winter months, while during the summer it is mostly dry. Snow can occur during the winter, however, this is not very common and usually occurs about once or twice a season. Below freezing temperatures are rare in the city, usually occurring about once or twice a winter. Extreme temperatures of 20 °F or −6.7 °C or colder are extremely rare, usually happening about once every five years. Summers are dry and cool with an average July high temperature of about 68 °F or 20 °C while lows are generally in the 50s °F. High temperatures in the mid-70s °F to the low 90s °F occur on average about once or twice every summer. Bandon's highest reading of 100 °F (37.8 °C) occurred on September 21, 1990. The lowest reading of 8 °F (−13.3 °C) was observed only three months later on December 21, 1990.

Climate data for Bandon, Oregon (1991–2020 normals, extremes 1941–present)
Month	Jan	Feb	Mar	Apr	May	Jun	Jul	Aug	Sep	Oct	Nov	Dec	Year
Record high °F (°C)	75 (24)	81 (27)	78 (26)	80 (27)	82 (28)	84 (29)	85 (29)	90 (32)	94 (34)	89 (32)	79 (26)	77 (25)	94 (34)
Mean daily maximum °F (°C)	54.7 (12.6)	55.7 (13.2)	56.3 (13.5)	58.2 (14.6)	62.0 (16.7)	65.3 (18.5)	68.0 (20.0)	68.7 (20.4)	67.6 (19.8)	63.8 (17.7)	58.0 (14.4)	54.6 (12.6)	61.1 (16.2)
Daily mean °F (°C)	47.6 (8.7)	48.0 (8.9)	48.6 (9.2)	50.5 (10.3)	54.3 (12.4)	57.7 (14.3)	60.4 (15.8)	60.6 (15.9)	58.7 (14.8)	54.9 (12.7)	50.3 (10.2)	47.1 (8.4)	53.2 (11.8)
Mean daily minimum °F (°C)	40.4 (4.7)	40.2 (4.6)	40.9 (4.9)	42.8 (6.0)	46.6 (8.1)	50.0 (10.0)	52.9 (11.6)	52.5 (11.4)	49.8 (9.9)	46.0 (7.8)	42.6 (5.9)	39.6 (4.2)	45.4 (7.4)
Record low °F (°C)	15 (−9)	14 (−10)	21 (−6)	24 (−4)	30 (−1)	33 (1)	37 (3)	35 (2)	27 (−3)	27 (−3)	21 (−6)	8 (−13)	8 (−13)
Average precipitation inches (mm)	9.25 (235)	7.19 (183)	7.39 (188)	5.17 (131)	2.98 (76)	1.51 (38)	0.35 (8.9)	0.46 (12)	1.40 (36)	4.02 (102)	8.23 (209)	9.83 (250)	57.78 (1,468)
Average snowfall inches (cm)	0 (0)	0.1 (0.25)	0.1 (0.25)	0 (0)	0 (0)	0 (0)	0 (0)	0 (0)	0 (0)	0 (0)	0 (0)	0.1 (0.25)	0.3 (0.75)
Average precipitation days (≥ 0.01 in)	20.1	18.0	20.2	17.0	11.8	9.0	3.9	4.5	7.1	14.4	19.6	20.8	166.4
Average snowy days (≥ 0.1 in)	0.0	0.0	0.0	0.0	0.0	0.0	0.0	0.0	0.0	0.0	0.0	0.0	0.0
Source: NOAA

== Demographics ==
Historical population
Census	Pop.	Note	%±
1880	175		—
1890	219		25.1%
1900	645		194.5%
1910	1,803		179.5%
1920	1,140		−36.8%
1930	1,516		33.0%
1940	1,004		−33.8%
1950	1,251		24.6%
1960	1,653		32.1%
1970	1,832		10.8%
1980	2,311		26.1%
1990	2,215		−4.2%
2000	2,833		27.9%
2010	3,066		8.2%
2020	3,321		8.3%

=== 2020 census ===
As of the 2020 census, Bandon had a population of 3,321. The median age was 60.1 years. 12.8% of residents were under the age of 18 and 40.9% of residents were 65 years of age or older. For every 100 females there were 87.8 males, and for every 100 females age 18 and over there were 85.3 males age 18 and over.

99.8% of residents lived in urban areas, while 0.2% lived in rural areas.

There were 1,687 households in Bandon, of which 13.5% had children under the age of 18 living in them. Of all households, 37.3% were married-couple households, 21.1% were households with a male householder and no spouse or partner present, and 35.6% were households with a female householder and no spouse or partner present. About 44.8% of all households were made up of individuals and 28.5% had someone living alone who was 65 years of age or older.

There were 2,077 housing units, of which 18.8% were vacant. Among occupied housing units, 59.9% were owner-occupied and 40.1% were renter-occupied. The homeowner vacancy rate was 1.3% and the rental vacancy rate was 5.7%.

Racial composition as of the 2020 census
Race	Number	Percent
White	2,920	87.9%
Black or African American	17	0.5%
American Indian and Alaska Native	46	1.4%
Asian	40	1.2%
Native Hawaiian and Other Pacific Islander	2	0.1%
Some other race	53	1.6%
Two or more races	243	7.3%
Hispanic or Latino (of any race)	200	6.0%

=== 2010 census ===
As of the census of 2010, there were 3,066 people, 1,466 households, and 762 families residing in the city. The population density was 1,106.9 inhabitants per square mile (427.4/km^{2}). There were 1,860 housing units at an average density of 671.5 units per square mile (259.3 units/km^{2}). The racial makeup of the city was 92.6% White, 0.4% African American, 1.4% Native American, 0.8% Asian, 0.1% Pacific Islander, 1.4% from other races, and 3.4% from two or more races. Hispanic or Latino of any race were 5.5% of the population.

There were 1,466 households, of which 18.1% had children under the age of 18 living with them, 37.6% were married couples living together, 10.2% had a female householder with no husband present, 4.2% had a male householder with no wife present, and 48.0% were non-families. 39.6% of all households were made up of individuals, and 20.8% had someone living alone who was 65 years of age or older. The average household size was 2.01 and the average family size was 2.62.

The median age in the city was 53.4 years. 15.3% of residents were under the age of 18; 6.3% were between the ages of 18 and 24; 17.3% were from 25 to 44; 31.2% were from 45 to 64; and 30% were 65 years of age or older. The gender makeup of the city was 46.3% male and 53.7% female.

=== 2000 census ===
As of the census of 2000, there were 2,833 people, 1,287 households, and 736 families residing in the city. The population density was 1,029.4 inhabitants per square mile (397.5/km^{2}). There were 1,535 housing units at an average density of 557.8 units per square mile (215.4 units/km^{2}). The racial makeup of the city was 92.48% White, 0.25% African American, 1.94% Native American, 0.60% Asian, 0.11% Pacific Islander, 0.95% from other races, and 3.67% from two or more races. Hispanic or Latino of any race were 2.75% of the population.

There were 1,287 households, out of which 21.2% had children under the age of 18 living with them, 43.4% were married couples living together, 10.1% had a female householder with no husband present, and 42.8% were non-families. 36.1% of all households were made up of individuals, and 19.0% had someone living alone who was 65 years of age or older. The average household size was 2.09 and the average family size was 2.71.

In the city, the population dispersal was 19.1% under the age of 18, 4.7% from 18 to 24, 19.4% from 25 to 44, 27.5% from 45 to 64, and 29.4% who were 65 years of age or older. The median age was 49 years. For every 100 females, there were 82.4 males. For every 100 females age 18 and over, there were 80.0 males. The median income for a household in the city was $29,492, and the median income for a family was $37,188. Males had a median income of $28,636 versus $22,722 for females. The per capita income for the city was $20,051. About 11.9% of families and 16.0% of the population were below the poverty line, including 34.1% of those under age 18 and 6.0% of those age 65 or over.

== Economy ==
Like many communities on the Oregon coast, Bandon had significant fishing and timber industries, which were greatly diminished by the 1980s, though some remnants still exist. Bandon's current economy revolves around wood products, fishing, tourism, and agriculture. The five largest employers in the area include Bandon Dunes Golf Course, Southern Coos Health District, School District #54C, Oregon Overseas Timber, and Hardin Optical.

=== Cheese ===
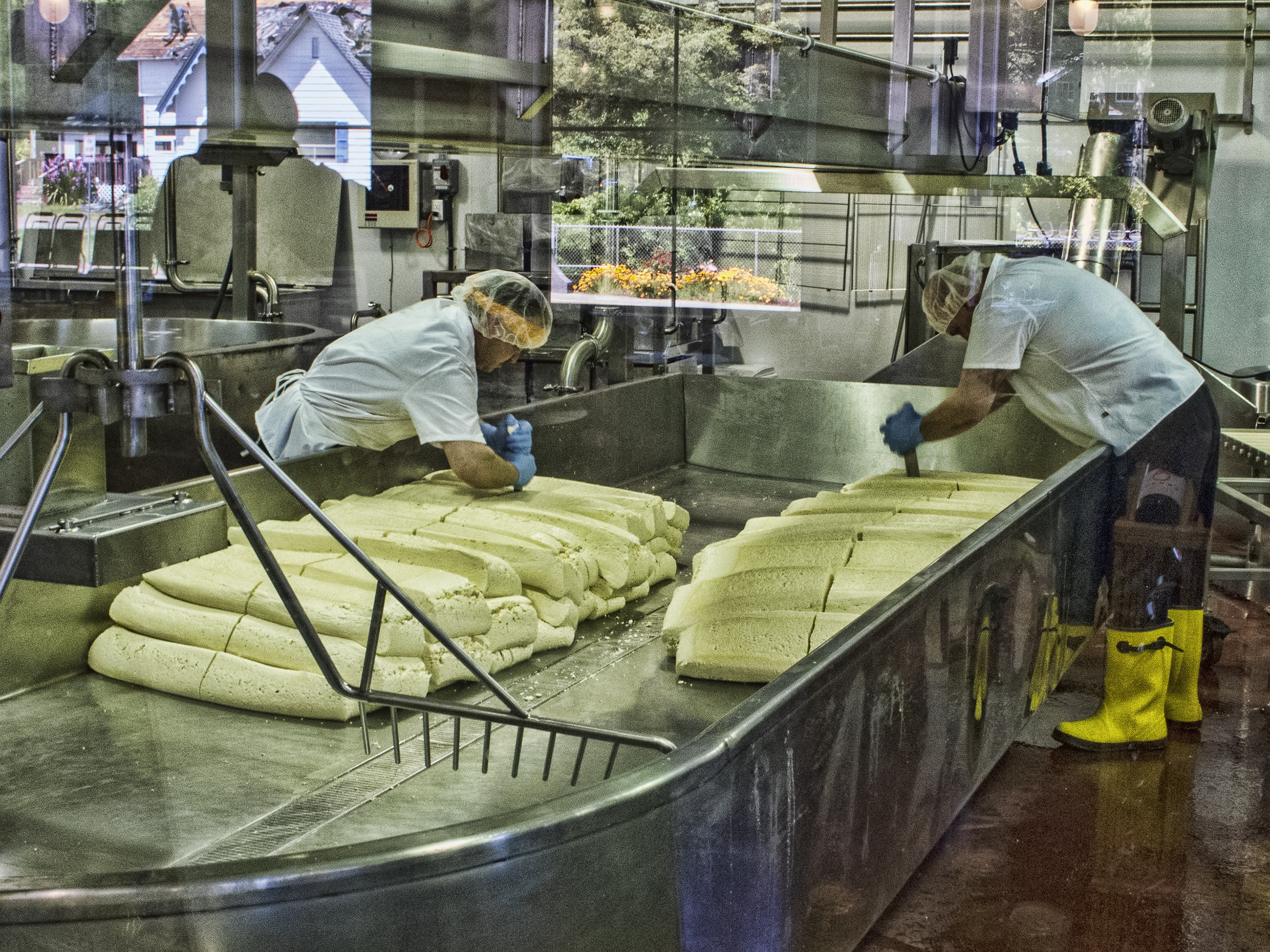
Cheesemaking at the Face Rock Creamery, Bandon

Between 1928 and 2000, dairy production and cheesemaking were an integral part of Bandon's economy. The Bandon facility was damaged by fire in 1936, and rebuilt as the Surfside Dairy in 1937. In 2000, Tillamook County Creamery Association bought the Bandon Cheese brand and promptly dismantled the factory; on October 4, 2005, the last of the staff was released and the Bandon factory closed. The Bandon Cheese name lives on as a brand of Tillamook Cheese.

In 2013, Face Rock Creamery opened on the former Bandon Cheese property with participation of the city government. Cheesemakers handcraft gourmet cheeses from beginning to end with viewing, sampling, and products available to visitors.

=== Cranberry industry ===
Bandon is a center of cranberry production, and has long been known as the "Cranberry Capital of Oregon". More than 100 growers harvest about 1,600 acres (6.5 km^{2}) around Bandon, raising 95 percent of Oregon's cranberries, and about 5 percent of the national crop. Production averages about 30 million pounds (14 million kg) of berries. Harvest is in the fall. In 1994, 304,000 barrels (48,300 m^{3}) were harvested—a record for Bandon. Some berries are trucked to Eugene and Albany. Others are taken to an Ocean Spray facility in Prosser, Washington, to be concentrated. This crop was introduced in 1855 by Charles McFarlin, for whom the McFarlin hybrid is named. A popular cranberry wine is made from Bandon, Oregon fruit.

Bandon also hosts a yearly Cranberry Festival. See below.

=== Golf resort ===
Bandon Dunes Golf Resort is a complex of six golf courses located just north of the city of Bandon. Five of the six golf courses are regulation length and the other is a short 13-hole par 3 course. The championship courses, Bandon Dunes, Old Macdonald, Pacific Dunes, and Bandon Trails are the top four courses in Oregon, (Passov, J., Golf Magazine, "Top 100 Courses You Can Play", Sept., 2016, p. 62).

=== Tourism ===
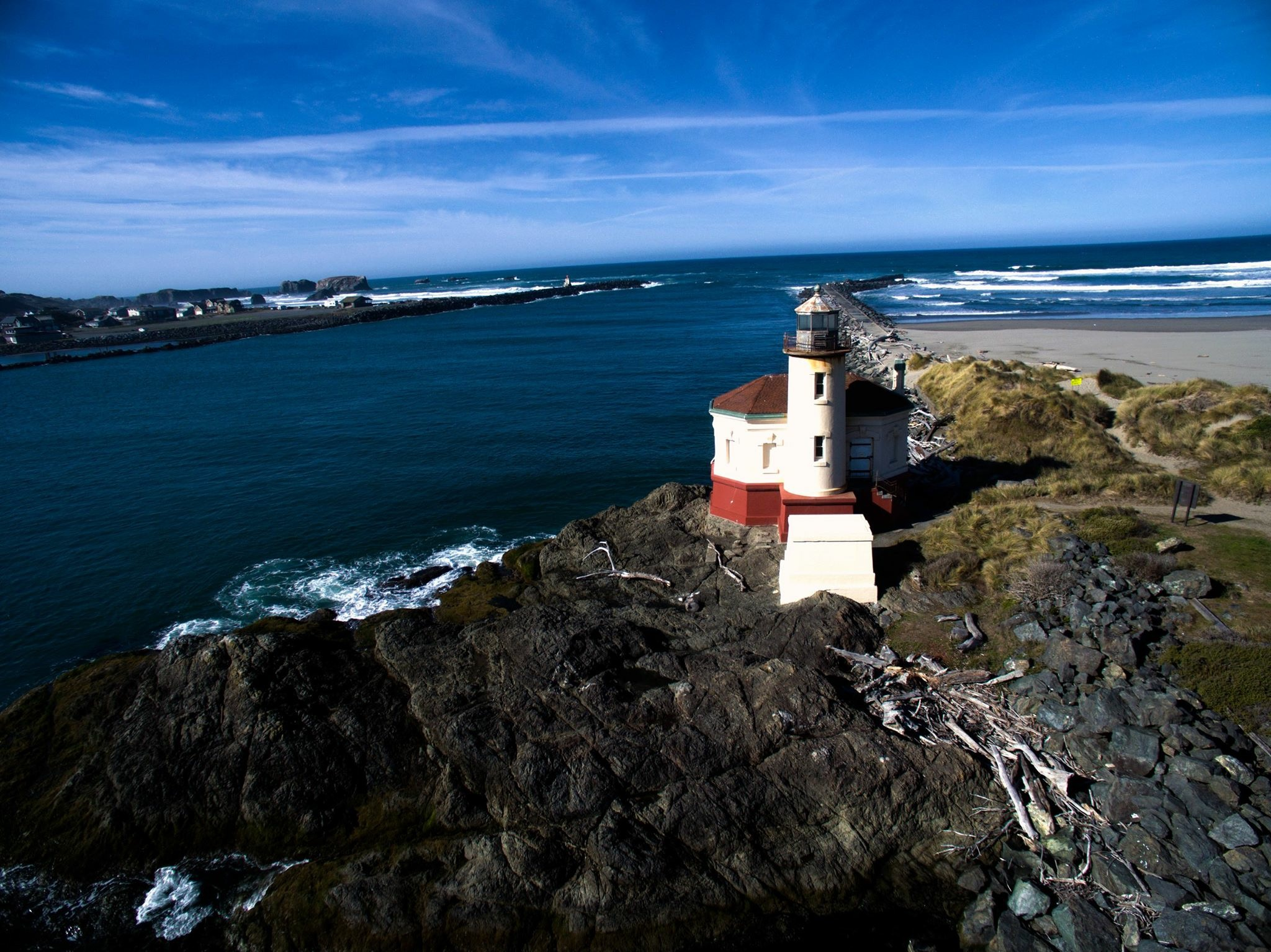
Coquille Lighthouse

In tourism literature, the city is often referred to as Bandon-by-the-Sea.

Surf enthusiasts come to Bandon for surfing & kite surfing. Bandon beaches offer a wide variety of surf opportunities for novice, intermediate, and expert surfers of both disciplines. Crowds are generally minimal and locals are friendly and accommodating.

Mountain bikers enjoy the newly opened Whiskey Run Mountain Bike Trails just north of town mountain biking.

One popular tourist activity is storm watching.

West Coast Game Park Safari was located just south of Bandon.

==== Cranberry Festival ====
The Annual Cranberry Festival takes place in the second weekend of September to celebrate the Cranberry harvest. The event draws tourists and participants from all areas of the Oregon coast, Washington and California. Begun in 1946, to honor the cranberry industry, 2023 marked the 77th year of the event.

==== Points of interest ====
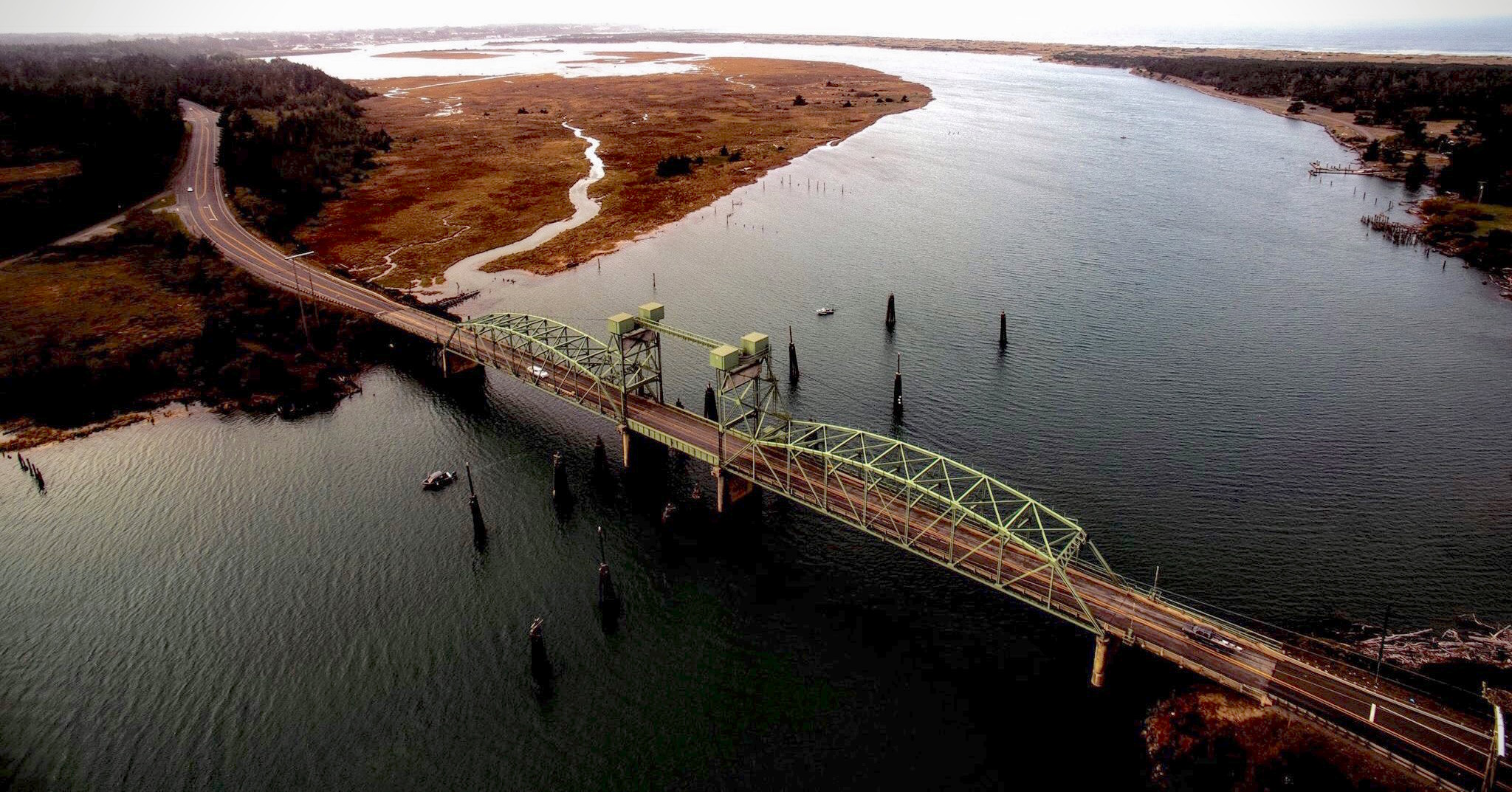
Aerial view of Bullards Bridge

- Bandon is known for its beaches and rock formations, including Face Rock State Scenic Viewpoint, where the annual Circles in the Sand event is held.
- The Coquille River Lighthouse is on Coquille River's north jetty at Bullards Beach State Park.
- Bandon State Airport
- Bullards Bridge on U.S. Highway 101 leading into Bandon from the north
- Oregon Islands National Wildlife Refuge
- Home and Cranberry Operation
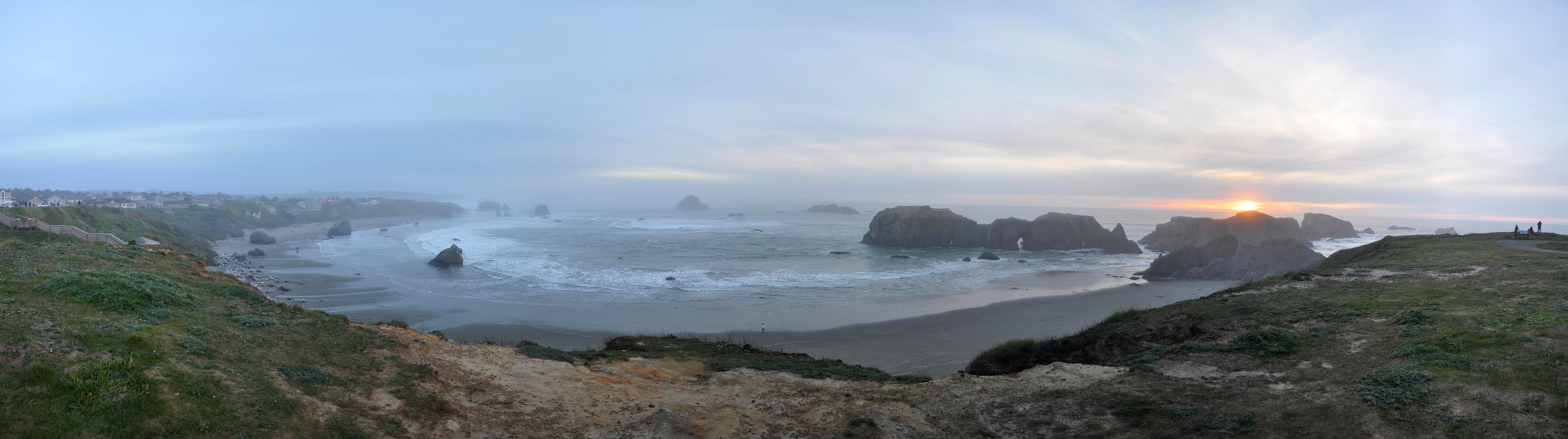
Sunset over the Pacific Ocean and part of the Oregon Islands National Wildlife Refuge. View is from Coquille Point in Bandon.

== Education ==
The school district is Bandon School District 54.

== Notable people ==
- Vic Backlund, State Representative
- Bill Bradbury, Oregon Secretary of State, 1999 - 2009
- Wlnsvey Campos State Senator for Oregon Senate District 18
- Randal O'Toole, economist
- James V. Scotti, astronomer
- Michael Waterman, mathematician, computer scientist, biologist
- Timothy Zahn, author

== Media ==
- Bandon Western World - weekly newspaper
- KBOG-LP 97.9 FM

== Sister City ==
Bandon has one sister city:

- (Republic of Ireland) Bandon, Ireland

== See also ==
- Port of Bandon
- Steamboats of the Coquille River (historical)
- FASTER (submarine communications)
