= Devil (disambiguation) =

A devil is the personification of evil as it is conceived in many and various cultures and religious traditions.

Devil or Devils may also refer to:

- Satan
  - Devil in Christianity
  - Iblis
- Demon
- Folk devil

== Art, entertainment, and media ==
=== Film and television ===
- The Devil (1908 film), a 1908 film directed by D. W. Griffith
- The Devil (1915 film), an American film starring Bessie Barriscale
- The Devil (1918 Hungarian film), a Hungarian film directed by Michael Curtiz
- The Devil (1918 German film), a German silent mystery film
- The Devil (1921 film), an American film starring George Arliss
- To Bed or Not to Bed (also known as The Devil), a 1963 Italian film
- The Devils (film), a 1971 British film directed by Ken Russell
- The Devil (1972 film), a Polish film directed by Andrzej Żuławski
- Devil (TV series), a 2008 Japanese television series remake of the South Korean series
- Devil (2010 film), a supernatural-thriller film produced by M. Night Shyamalan
- Devil (2011 film), an Argentine drama film directed by Nicanor Loretti
- Devil (2024 film), an Indian horror film
- The Devil (2025 film), a Kannada-language Indian film
- Devils (TV series), an Italian English language television drama series

=== Games and characters ===
- Devil (Dungeons & Dragons)
- Devilish (video game), a 1991 multiplatform action video game
- Bio-Devil, a line of bosses from the Mega Man series
- The Devil, an evil villainous character who is a version of Satan and a villain and final boss from the video game Cuphead
- Kazuya Mishima, Tekken character with Devil as his alter-ego
- Devil, a fictional wolf companion of the Phantom

=== Literature ===
- The Devil (Molnár play), a 1907 play by Ferenc Molnár
- The Devil (novel), a 1911 novel by Leo Tolstoy
- The Devil (Javid play), a 1918 play by Huseyn Javid
- The Devil (Papini book), a 1953 book by Giovanni Papini
- Demons (Dostoevsky novel) (also The Devils), an 1871 novel by Fyodor Dostoevsky
- Devils (anthology), an anthology of themed fantasy and science fiction short stories

=== Music ===
==== Albums and EPs ====
- Devil (Babes in Toyland album), 2000
- Devil (Chiodos album), 2014
- Devil (Die Ärzte album), a reissue of the 1984 Die Ärzte album Debil
- Devil (Lydia album), 2013
- Devil (Super Junior album), 2015
- Devil, a 2020 mixtape by Virgen María and A.K.A.
- Devils (The 69 Eyes album), 2004
- Devils (Xmal Deutschland album), 1989
- The Devil (album), a 2015 album by Blue Stahli
- Devil (EP), a 2022 EP by Max Changmin

==== Songs ====
- "Devil" (CLC song), 2019
- "Devil" (Shinedown song), 2018
- "Devil" (Stereophonics song), 2005
- Devil (Super Junior song), 2015
- "Devil", a song by Max Changmin from Devil
- "Devil", a song by Cash Cash from Blood, Sweat & 3 Years
- "Devil", a song by Gothminister from Gothic Electronic Anthems
- "Devil", a song by Lydia from Devil
- "Devil", a song by Ronnie Radke from the mixtape Watch Me
- "Devil", a song by Staind from Chapter V
- "Devil", a song by Underoath from The Place After This One
- "DDevil", a song by System of a Down from their self-titled album
- "The Devil", a song by Blue Stahli from The Devil

== Food ==
- To devil, to cook with spicy sauce as in
  - Devilled eggs
  - Devilled kidneys

== Places ==
- Devils Branch (disambiguation), several streams in the United States
- Devil Canyon Creek, San Diego County, California
- Devil Cape, Greenland
- Devils Crags, Sierra Nevada, California
- Devil's Lake (disambiguation)
- Devils Mountain (disambiguation)
- Devil's Peak (disambiguation)
- Devil River, Tasman Region, New Zealand
- Devil's Tower (disambiguation)

== Roles ==
- Devilling, to be a trainee in the legal systems of the United Kingdom and Ireland
- Printer's devil, a printer's apprentice

== Sports ==
- Elimination race, the discipline in track cycling known colloquially as "the Devil"
- New Jersey Devils, an NHL ice hockey team
- Cardiff Devils, an EIHL ice hockey Team
- A.C. Milan, an Italian football club nicknamed "The Devil"

== Other uses ==
- The Devil (tarot card)
- DevIL, an open source image library
- Jersey Devil, a legendary creature in the southern part of New Jersey, US.
- Tasmanian devil, a carnivorous marsupial
- Thorny devil, an Australian desert lizard
- Willy (textile machine), also known as twilly-devil or devil

== See also ==
- Demon (disambiguation)
- Satan (disambiguation)
