= Wecoma =

Wecoma may refer to:

- RV Wecoma, a seagoing research marine vessel based in Newport, Oregon operated by NOAA and OSU
- Wecoma, Oregon, a community of the Oregon Coast which was merged into Oceanlake, Oregon in 1945—which in 1965—merged with four other cities to form Lincoln City
- Wecoma Beach, the current beach adjacent to the former community
- Wecoma SaaS, a Consent Management Platform (CMP) that provides device-level and user-level consent management for GDPR and ePrivacy compliance.
