= Devil's Lake =

Devil's Lake or Devils Lake may refer to:

== Settlements ==
- Devils Lake, Michigan, U.S.
- Devils Lake, North Dakota, U.S.
  - Devils Lake station

== Lakes ==
- Devils Lake (Michigan), U.S., the name of several lakes
- Devils Lake (Minnesota), U.S.
- Devils Lake (North Dakota), U.S.
- Devils Lake (Deschutes County, Oregon), U.S.
- Devils Lake (Lincoln County, Oregon), U.S.
- Devil's Lake (Wisconsin), U.S.
- Teufelssee ('Devil's Lake'), Berlin, Germany
- Lake Chyortovo, Yamalo-Nenets Autonomous Okrug, Russia

== Other uses ==
- Devil's Lake State Park (disambiguation)
- Devils Lake Sioux Tribe, former name of the Spirit Lake Tribe of North Dakota
