= Devils Branch =

Devils Branch may refer to:

- Devils Branch (Little Persimmon Creek tributary), a stream in Georgia
- Devils Branch (Runs Branch tributary), a stream in Georgia
- Devils Branch (Knox Creek tributary), a stream in Kentucky and Virginia
