= 魔王 =

魔王 may refer to:

- Lucifer (South Korean TV series) (마왕), South Korean television series
  - Devil (TV series), Japanese remake of the Korean suspense drama series Lucifer
- Maoh: Juvenile Remix (魔王 ~JUVENILE REMIX~), Japanese manga series

== See also ==
- The dictionary definition of 魔王 at Wiktionary
- Archenemy (disambiguation)
- Devil (disambiguation)
- Lucifer (disambiguation)
- Mao (disambiguation)
