= The Devils =

The Devils is a name for:

- The Devils (play), the 1960 play by John Whiting based on the book The Devils of Loudon (1952) by Aldous Huxley
- The Devils (film), the 1971 Ken Russell film
- The Devils (band), a 2000s pop music project of Nick Rhodes and Stephen Duffy
- The New Jersey Devils, a National Hockey League team
- The Devils (2002 film), a 2002 French drama film
- The Devils (Abercrombie novel), a 2025 book by Joe Abercrombie

The Devils is also an alternate name or translation for:

- Demons (Dostoevsky novel) or The Possessed, an 1872 novel by Russian writer Fyodor Dostoevsky
- Les Diaboliques (film), a 1955 film by Henri-Georges Clouzot

== See also ==
- Devils (disambiguation)
