= Devils Mountain =

Devils Mountain or Devil's Mountain can refer to any of several peaks with similar names:

- Devil Mountain, Ontario, Canada
- Devil's Tower (disambiguation)
- Devil's Peak (disambiguation)
- Ayan or Auyán-tepui (Devil's House), Venezuela
- Morro do Diabo (Devil's Hill), Rio Grande do Sul, Brazil

== See also ==
- Devil Mountain Lakes, Alaska, United States
- Kill Devil Hills, North Carolina, United States
- Seven Devils Mountains, Idaho, United States
- Teufelsberg (disambiguation), the German name for "Devil's Mountain"
