= Mount Diablo (disambiguation) =

Mount Diablo is a mountain in Contra Costa County, California.

Mount Diablo may also refer to:

- Devils Peak (Santa Barbara County, California), a peak on Santa Cruz Island
- Mount Diablo, a peak in Jamaica
- Mount Diablo, one of several peaks in British Columbia, Canada with a devil-related name; see Devils Couch
- Mount Diablo, a variant name of Devil Peak (Nevada)

== See also ==
- Devil's Peak (disambiguation)
