= Tamborasi River =

River in Southeast Sulawesi, Indonesia

Coordinates: 3.7604°S 121.122°E

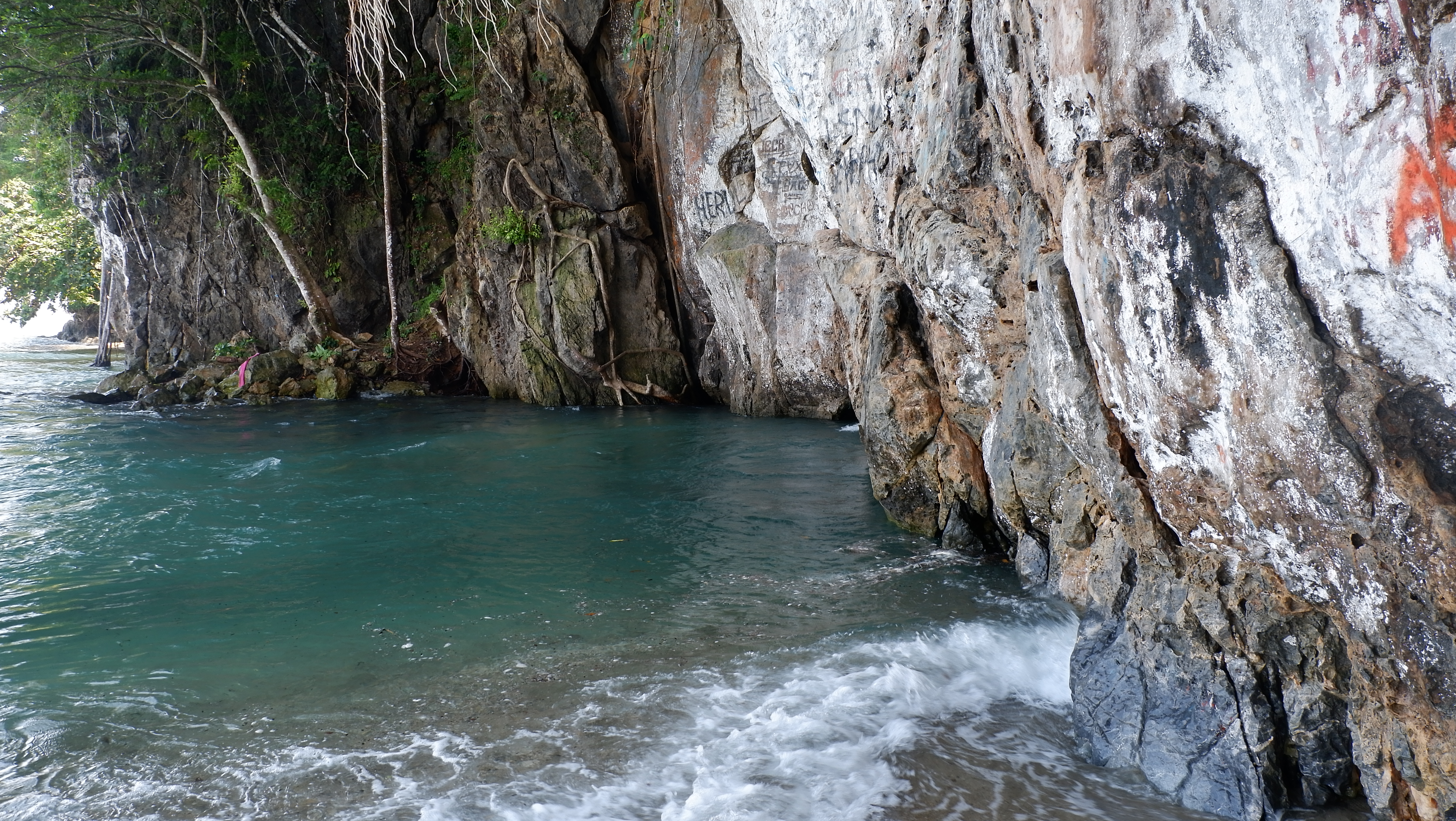

Location
- Country: Kolaka, Southeast Sulawesi, Indonesia

Physical characteristics
- Mouth: Flores Sea
- Length: 0.020 km (0.012 mi)
- Width
  - average: 15 m

The Tamborasi River is a river in Tamborasi, Kolaka, Southeast Sulawesi, Indonesia. It is located approximately 70km (43 miles) north of the city of Kolaka. With a length of 20m and an approximate width of 15m, it is the world's shortest river, but the Guinness Book of World Records claimed it to be the Roe River before the deletion of the category. It empties into the Flores Sea.

== See also ==
- List of drainage basins of Indonesia
