= Teufelsberg (disambiguation) =

Teufelsberg is German for "Devil's Mountain" or "Devil's Hill" and may refer to:

- places in Germany:
  - Teufelsberg, a low hill in Berlin
  - Teufelsberg (Palatinate), a hill in the Palatine Forest, Rhineland-Palatinate
  - Teufelsberg (Rhön), a hill in the Rhön Mountains, Bavaria and Hesse
  - Teufelsberg, a hillock in the northeast of the Aubinger Lohe, the site of Aubing Castle
  - Teufelsberg (Altomünster), a village in the market borough of Altomünster, Dachau county, Bavaria
  - a section of the route on the endurosport event Rund um Zschopau in Scharfenstein
- in Czech Republic:
  - the German name for the North Bohemian hill of Malý Bezděz
  - the German name for the hill of Čertová hora in the Giant Mountains
- in Namibia:
  - Teufelsberg (Namibia), a hill in Africa

== See also ==
- Devil's Mountain (disambiguation)
- Devil's Peak (disambiguation)
