= Devil's Tower (disambiguation) =

Devils Tower is a monolith and national monument in Wyoming, U.S.

Devil's Tower may also refer to:

- Devil's Tower (film), a 2014 film
- Devil's Tower (Gibraltar), a watchtower in Gibraltar where fossil remains of Neanderthals were discovered
- Devil's Tower (mast) (Teufelsturm), main antenna mast of Bodenseesender
- Devil's Tower (oil platform), Gulf of Mexico
- Devils Tower (Tasmania), an island in northern Bass Strait, Australia
- Devil's Tower, a 12th-century watch tower in Yelabuga, Tatarstan, Russia
