= D River =

River in Lincoln City, Oregon, United States

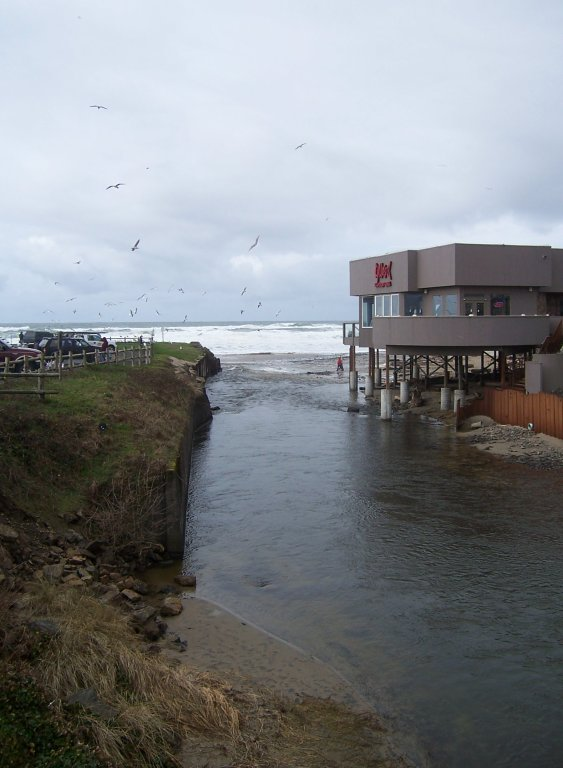
- Looking downstream toward the Pacific

- Location of the mouth of the D River in Oregon
- Etymology: Winning entry in a naming contest from 1940; 86 years ago, presumably after Devils Lake where it flows from

Location
- Country: United States
- State: Oregon
- County: Lincoln

Physical characteristics
- Source: Devils Lake
  - location: Lincoln City
  - coordinates: 44°58′02″N 124°00′55″W
  - elevation: 9 ft (2.7 m)
- Mouth: Pacific Ocean
  - location: Lincoln City
  - coordinates: 44°58′04.91″N 124°01′02.35″W
  - elevation: 7 ft (2.1 m)

The D River is a river in Lincoln City, Oregon, United States. The once-nameless river was at one time the "shortest river in the world" in the Guinness World Records at 440 feet (130 m).

== World record dispute ==
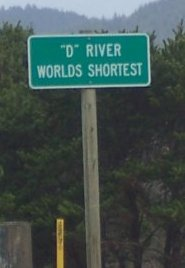
"World's Shortest" river

The world's shortest title was lost in 1989 when Guinness named the Roe River in Montana as the world's shortest. Attempting to reclaim the title, the people of Lincoln City submitted a new measurement to Guinness of about 120 feet (37 m) marked at "extreme high tide". At that time, Lincoln City's Chamber of Commerce described the Roe as a "drainage ditch surveyed for a school project". Montana supporters shot back that the D was merely an "ocean water backup," pointed out that there was an alternative fork to the Roe which was only 30 feet (9.1 m) long, and suggested that a new survey be conducted. Guinness apparently never ruled on the dispute, leaving the claim by the Roe to stand, but instead, starting in 2006, chose to no longer list the shortest river, possibly because of this ongoing dispute.

== Geography ==
The D River flows from Devils Lake, under U.S. Route 101, and into the Pacific Ocean, entirely within the city limits of Lincoln City. The D River State Recreation Site off Highway 101 is home to two of the world's largest kite festivals in the summer and fall.

This area was originally settled as the town of Delake, which was later incorporated with other nearby towns to form Lincoln City in 1965. The river had been known by several names, including simply "the outlet", and earned its short name in a contest.

== See also ==
- List of rivers of Oregon
- Ombla, in Croatia, claimed to be the shortest river in the world at 30 m (98 ft)
- Reprua River, in Abkhazia, also claimed to be the shortest river in the world at 18 m (59 ft)
