= Cone Islet =

Island in south-eastern Australia

Coordinates: 39°29′S 146°39′E

Cone Islet is a small granite island, with an area of 4.82 ha, in south-eastern Australia. It is part of Tasmania’s Curtis Group, lying in northern Bass Strait between the Furneaux Group and Wilsons Promontory in Victoria.

== Fauna ==
Recorded breeding seabird and wader species include short-tailed shearwater, fairy prion, common diving-petrel, Pacific gull and sooty oystercatcher. The metallic skink is also present.

== See also ==
The other islands in the Curtis Group:

- Curtis Island
- Devils Tower
- Sugarloaf Rock
