= Sugarloaf Rock (Curtis Group) =

Island im southeastern Australia

Coordinates: 39°31′S 146°39′E

Sugarloaf Rock is a small granite island, with an area of 1.07 ha, in south-eastern Australia. It is part of Tasmania’s Curtis Group, lying in northern Bass Strait between the Furneaux Group and Wilsons Promontory in Victoria.

== Fauna ==
Recorded breeding seabird species include fairy prion and common diving-petrel. It is also used as a haul-out site for Australian fur seals.

== Flora ==
Some of the flora that have been recorded on Sugarloaf Rock include the Zantedeschia aethiopica.

== See also ==
The other islands in the Curtis Group:

- Cone Islet
- Curtis Island
- Devils Tower
