= Devil's Lake State Recreation Area =

State park in Oregon, United States

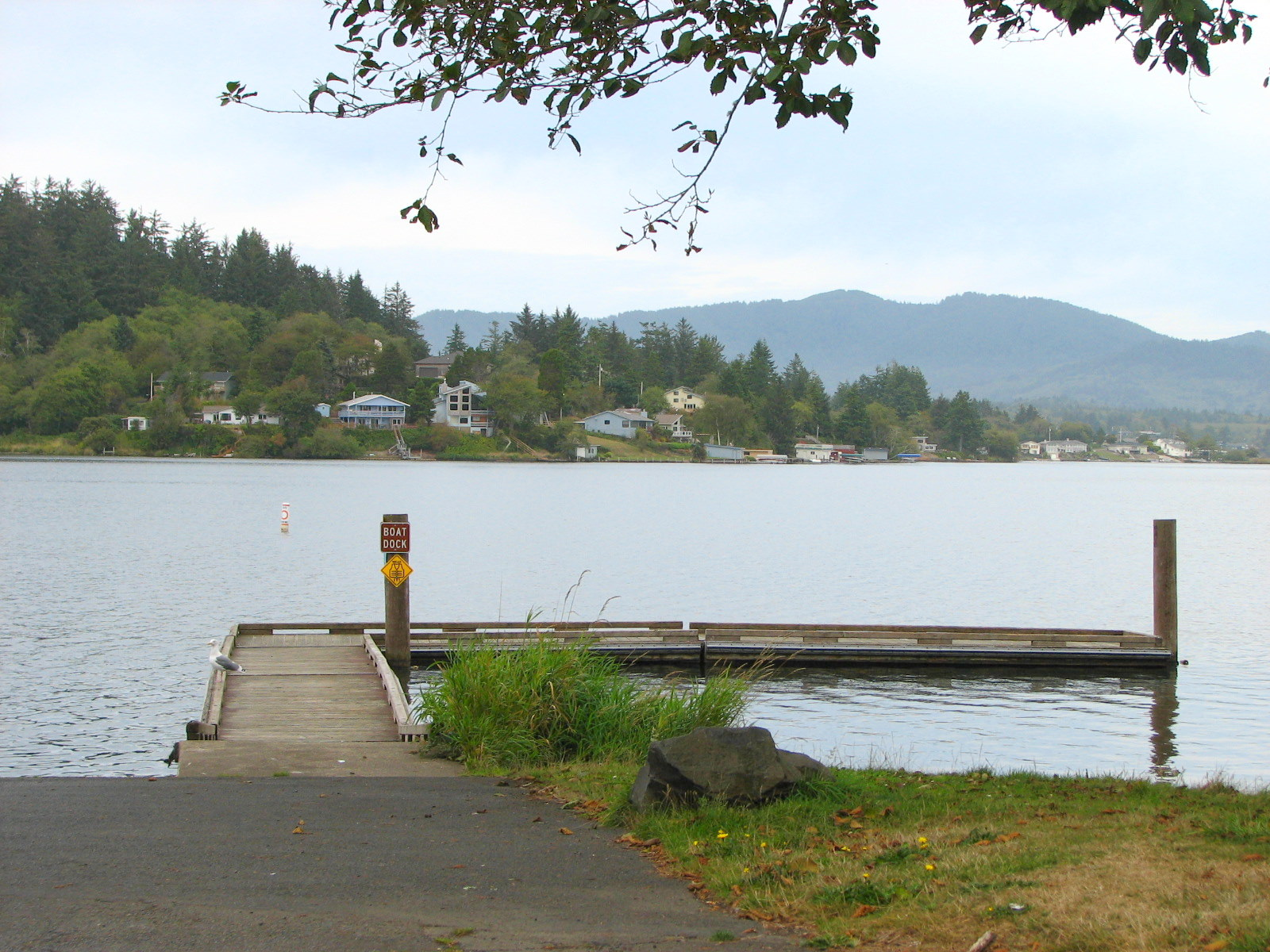
- Oregon State Parks

- Location within Oregon Location within the United States
- Type: Public, state
- Location: Lincoln County, Oregon
- Nearest city: Lincoln City
- Coordinates: 44°58′14″N 124°00′44″W
- Operator: Oregon Parks and Recreation Department
- Status: Open
- Website: https://stateparks.oregon.gov/index.cfm?do=park.profile&parkId=155

Devil's Lake State Recreation Area (also Devil's Lake State Park) is a state park in the U.S. state of Oregon, administered by the Oregon Parks and Recreation Department.

It is the only coastal Oregon State park with a campground located in a city. The campground area is located at the southwest shore of Devils Lake in Lincoln City, and the day use area is on the south shore. The park provides kayaks for those participating in summer guided kayak wildlife tours.

Activities include camping (RV, tent, yurt, and biker), boat, water skiing, swimming, and personal watercraft.

== See also ==
- D River State Recreation Site, a state park beach within walking distance
- List of Oregon state parks
