= Finders Keepers (Lincoln City, Oregon) =

Finders Keepers is a recreational treasure hunting program in Lincoln City, Oregon, United States.

== History ==
Fodor's has said Finders Keepers was established in 1997. Other sources have said the program was established in 1999 via the Millennium Float Project. According to the Lincoln County Leader, "Finders Keepers began as the Oregon Coast Festival of Glass, a celebration of the millennium in 2000."

Finders Keepers has been described as a city-sponsored "hidden glass float event" operated by Explore Lincoln City that involves placing thousands of glass floats made by local artists for people to find along a 7-mile span of beaches between Roads End and Siletz Bay. Float drops often correspond to holidays and other celebrations such as Valentine's Day. The tradition pays tribute to the Japanese glass floats that were once commonly found on Oregon beaches.

Eleven artists made floats for the program in 2022. The Jennifer Sears Studio has created floats. Sixteen float drops were scheduled in 2024 and 2025. In 2024, Finders Keepers was the subject of an exhibit at the North Lincoln County Historical Museum.
