= Giant Springs =

Coordinates: 47°32′03″N 111°13′48″W

Giant Springs Big Spring, Wonderful Spring, Roe River, North Fork Roe River
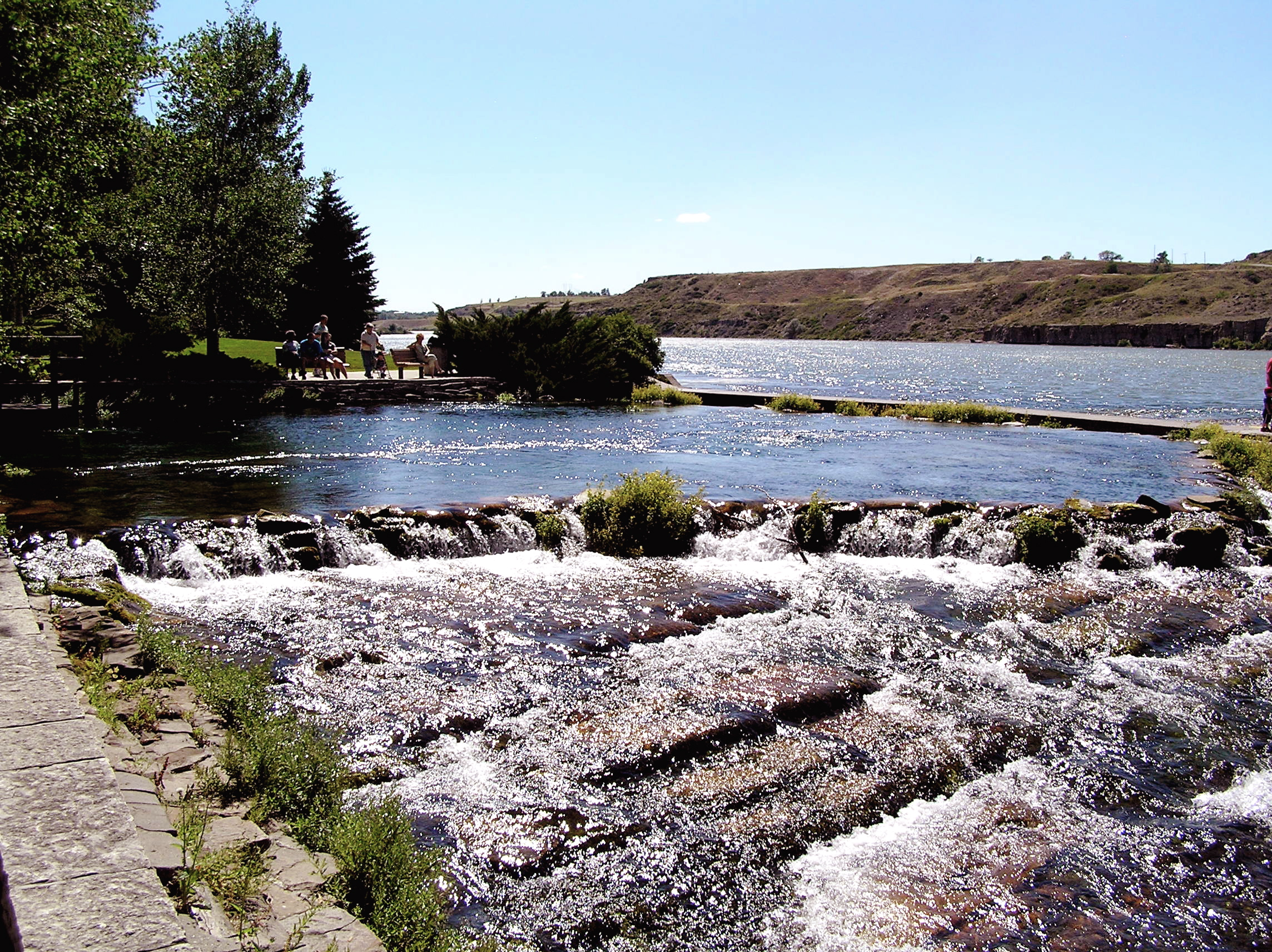
- Giant Springs

Location
- Country: United States
- State: Montana
- District: Cascade County
- City: Great Falls

Physical characteristics
- Source
  - location: Montana
- Mouth: Roe River
  - location: Great Falls, Cascade County, Montana
  - elevation: 3,314 ft (1,010 m)
- Length: 0.04 mi (0.064 km)
- Discharge
  - location: Giant Springs outlet
  - average: 242 cu ft/s (6.9 m^{3}/s)

Giant Springs is a large first-magnitude spring located near Great Falls, Montana and is the central feature of Giant Springs State Park. Its water has a constant temperature of 54 °F (12 °C) and originates from snowmelt in the Little Belt Mountains, 60 miles (97 km) away. According to chlorofluorocarbon dating, the water takes about 3,000 years to travel underground before returning to the surface at the springs.

Giant Springs is formed by an opening in a part of the Madison aquifer, a vast aquifer underlying 5 U.S. States and 3 Canadian Provinces. The conduit between the mountains and the spring is the geological stratum found in parts of the northwest United States called the Madison Limestone. Although some of the underground water from the Little Belt Mountains escapes to form Giant Springs, some stays underground and continues flowing, joining sources from losing streams in the Black Hills, Big Horn Mountains and other areas. The aquifer eventually surfaces in Canada. Giant Springs has an average discharge of 242 cubic feet (6.9 m^{3}) of water per second or 150 million gallons per day.

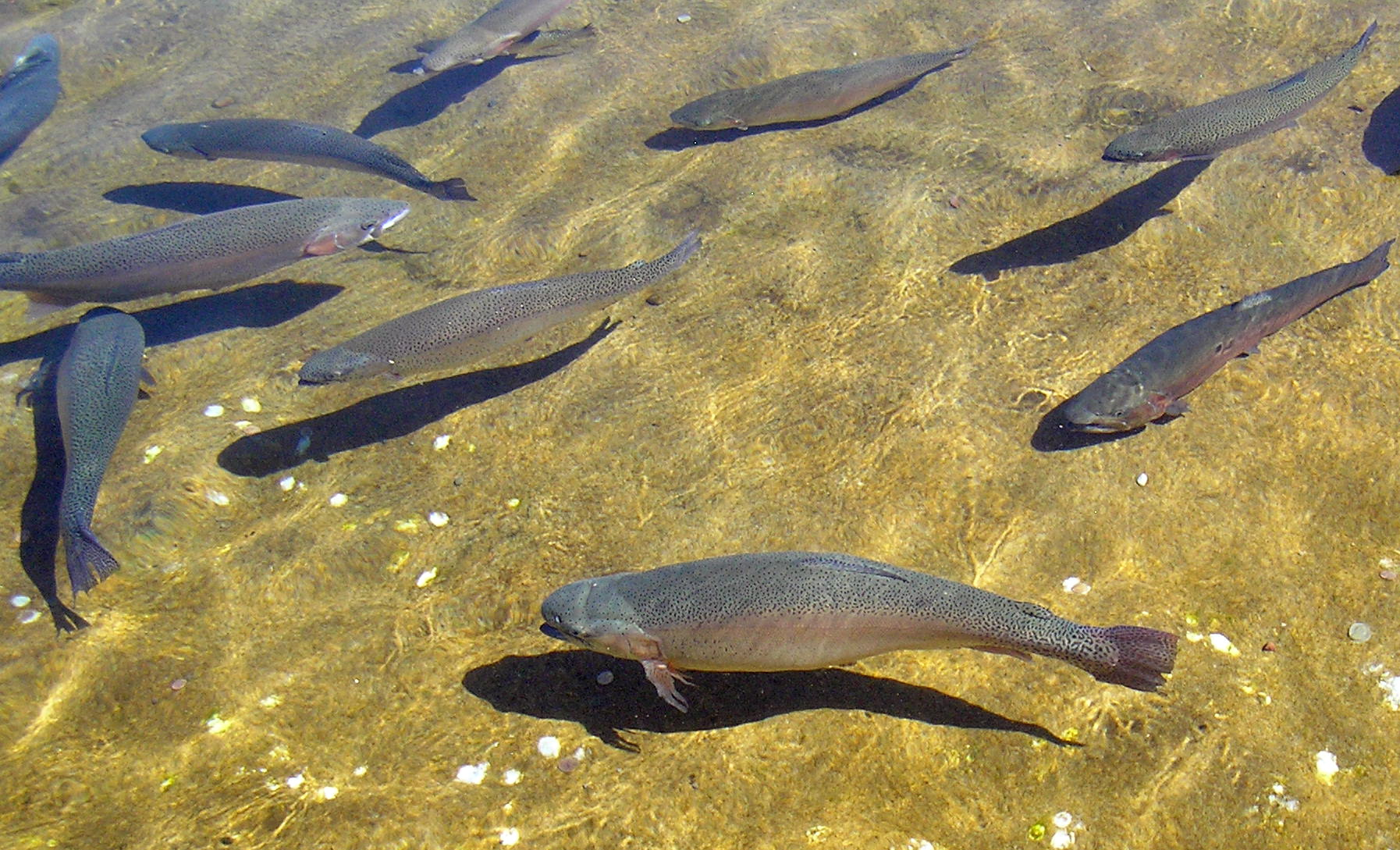
Rainbow trout in show pond of Giant Springs Fish Hatchery

The spring outlet is located in Giant Springs State Park, just downstream and northeast of Great Falls, Montana on the east bank of the Missouri River. Giant Springs was first described by Lewis and Clark during their exploration of the Louisiana Purchase in 1805. Before that, the Blackfeet people utilized the springs as an easy-to-access water source in the winter. The springs were mostly ignored by settlers until 1884 when the town of Great Falls was established and the springs became the place for Sunday recreational activities. In the mid-1970s the park was established as a Montana State Park.

Today, some of the spring water is bottled annually for human consumption and some of the discharge is used for a trout hatchery. The hatchery is a Montana state trout hatchery named Giant Springs Trout Hatchery and raises mostly rainbow trout. The spring serves as the headwaters of the 200-foot (61 m)-long Roe River, once listed as the shortest river in the world according to Guinness Book of World Records. The river flows into the Missouri River which is near the spring and borders its state park.

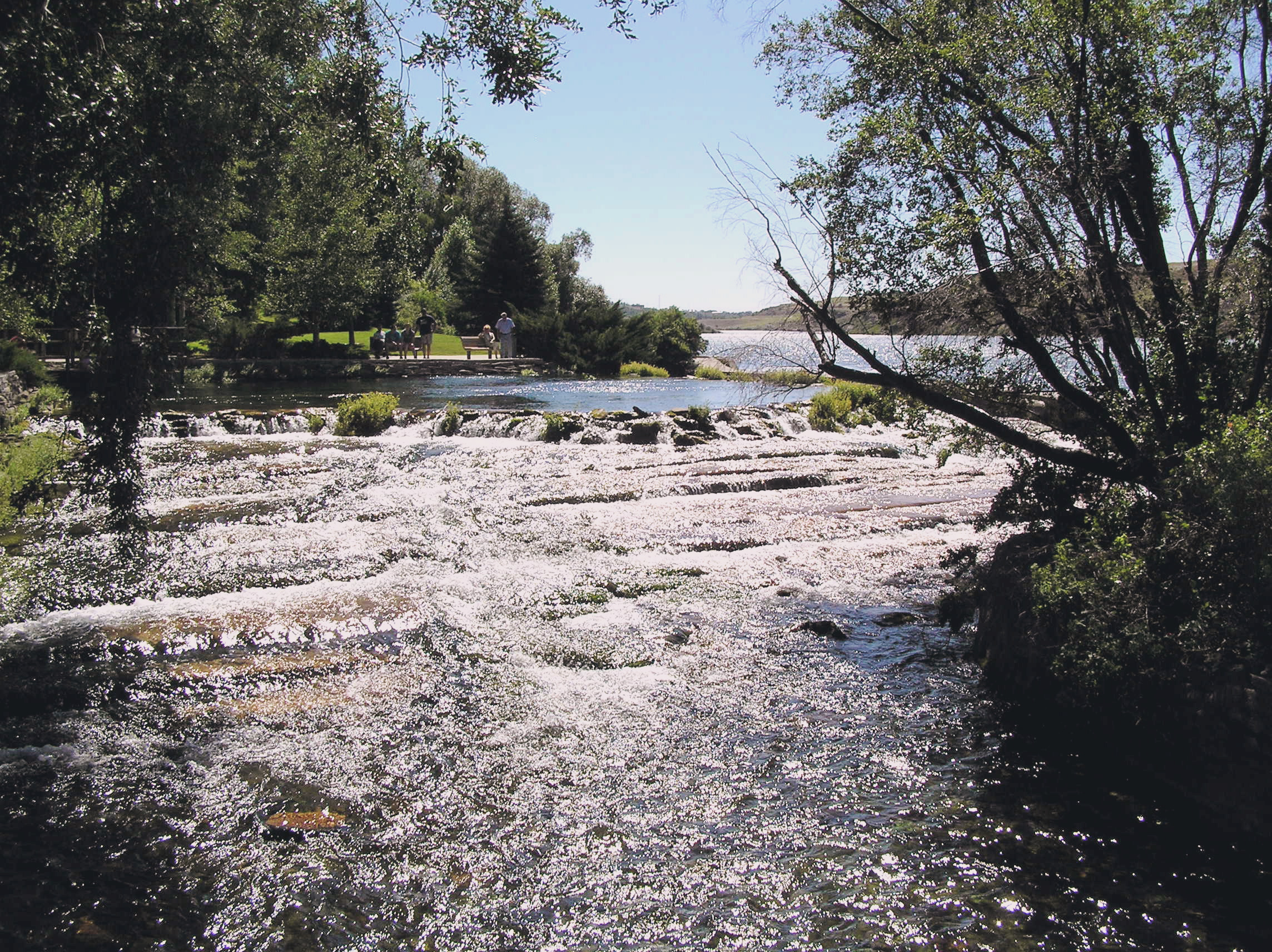
Roe River flowing from Giant Springs

== See also ==
- Spring (hydrosphere)
