= Devil's Lake State Park =

Devil's Lake State Park may refer to the following:

- Devils Lake State Parks (North Dakota), consisting of:
  - Grahams Island State Park
  - Black Tiger Bay State Recreation Area
- Devils Lake State Recreation Area in Oregon, formerly known as Devil's Lake State Park
- Devil's Lake State Park (Wisconsin)

== See also ==
- Devil's Den State Park, Arkansas
- Devils Fork State Park, South Carolina
- Devil's Hopyard State Park, Connecticut
- Devil's Millhopper Geological State Park, Florida
