= D River State Recreation Site =

State park in Oregon, United States

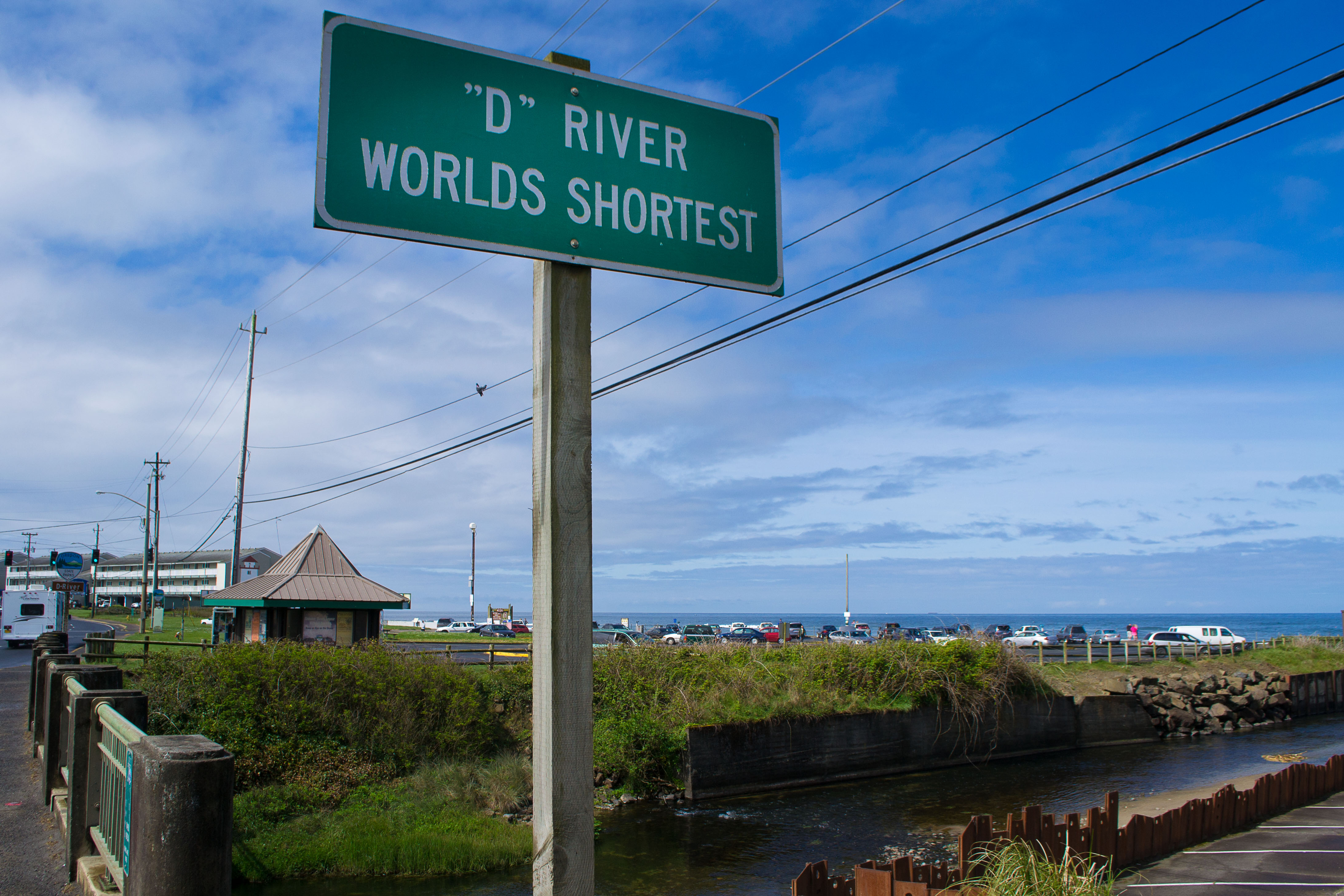

- Location within Oregon Location within the United States
- Interactive map of D River State Recreation Site
- Type: Public, state
- Location: Lincoln County, Oregon
- Nearest city: Lincoln City
- Coordinates: 44°58′01″N 124°01′04″W
- Operator: Oregon Parks and Recreation Department

D River State Recreation Site (also D River State Wayside and D River State Park) is a state park in the U.S. state of Oregon, administered by the Oregon Parks and Recreation Department. It is a sandy beach of the Pacific Ocean within central Lincoln City along the length of the 120-foot (37 m) long D River, one of the world's shortest rivers.

== Description ==
The site provides public access to Wecoma Beach, part of Lincoln City's 7.5 miles (12.1 km) of beach. There is parking and day use facilities, and no fees. The site has access to river and ocean fishing.

Two of the world's largest kite flying festivals are held here, one in the spring and one in the fall, as well as a summer kite festival which features several professional kite fliers. It was named by Kitelines Magazine as one of the best places in the world to fly a kite. The area also has two year-round 10-kilometre (6.2 mi) Volkssport walking courses.

D River State Recreation Site is considered among the ten best places along the Oregon coast for whale watching. Whale watching guide volunteers are present one week in January and one in March to help visitors see and understand the whale migration.

The area of ocean where the D River enters the sea creates consistent year-round surfing conditions suitable for intermediate skills.

Like many Oregon coast locations, flocks of seagulls are frequently present in winter. The most common species are western gull, glaucous-winged gull, and California gull. Occasionally Thayer's gull and American herring gull are observed here.

== See also ==
- Devils Lake State Recreation Area, a campground and a separate natural area surrounding Devils Lake, both within walking distance
- List of Oregon state parks
