= Devils Lake (Minnesota) =

Lake in the state of Minnesota, United States

- Location within Minnesota
- Location: Otter Tail County, Minnesota
- Coordinates: 46°37′35″N 95°39′23″W
- Type: mesotrophic
- Basin countries: United States
- Surface area: 314 acres (127.1 ha)
- Max. depth: 67 ft (20 m)

Devils Lake is a lake in the Otter Tail County in Minnesota. The lake occupies 314 acres (1.3 km^{2}) in size. At its deepest point the lake is 67 feet (20 m) deep, however, most of the lake is 15 feet (4.6 m) or less in depth

The lake is a locally popular fishing spot. The lake is mesotrophic.
