= Devil's Tower (oil platform) =

Oil platform

Coordinates: 28°12′32″N 88°44′15″W

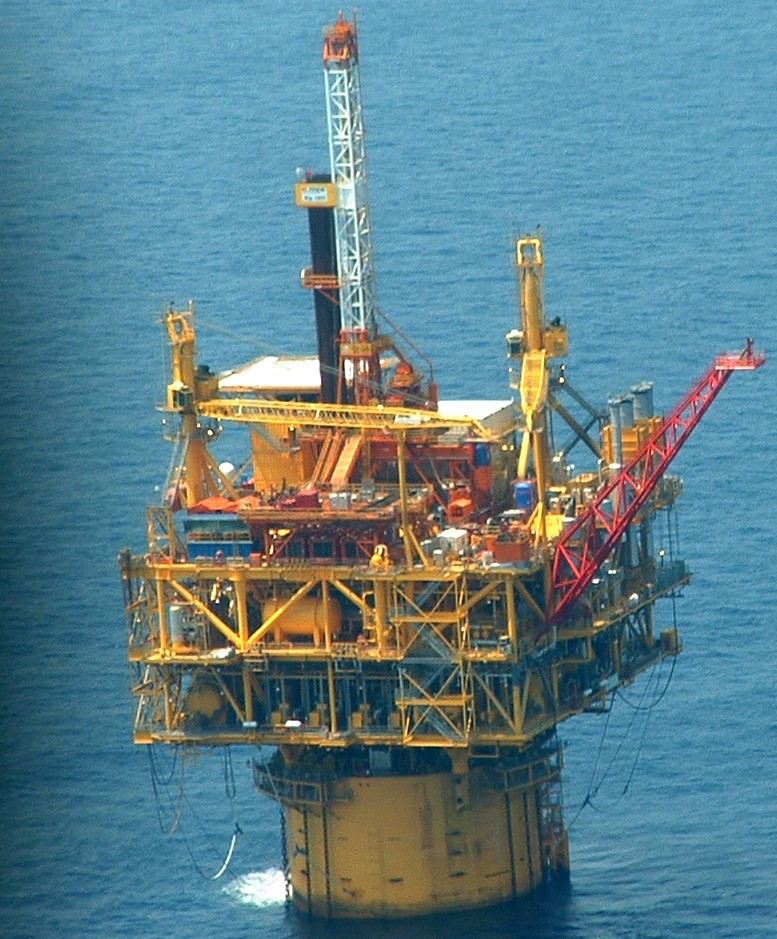
Devils Tower in 2004.

Devils Tower is a deep-water oil and gas production Spar oil platform located in the Gulf of Mexico and named after Devils Tower National Monument.

Devils Tower is located in block 773 of the Mississippi Canyon region of the Gulf of Mexico. Until 2010 it was the record holder for being located in the deepest water for a production truss spar (this record was broken by Royal Dutch Shell's Perdido platform). It was completed at the end of 2003. Originally it was built for and operated by Dominion Exploration which sold its Gulf of Mexico holdings to Eni which now operates the platform. The platform is owned by Williams (NYSE: WMB)

The facility was built by J. Ray McDermott and is located 5,610 feet (1,710 m) above the seabed.
