= Devils Branch (Knox Creek tributary) =

Stream in Kentucky, U.S.

Coordinates: 37.467608°N 82.056578°W

Devils Branch is a stream in Buchanan County, Virginia and Pike County, Kentucky.

Devils Branch was named for Devil Anse Hatfield, a figure in the Hatfield–McCoy feud.

== See also ==
- List of rivers of Kentucky
- List of rivers of Virginia
