= Devils Lake (Lincoln County, Oregon) =

Lake in Oregon, United States

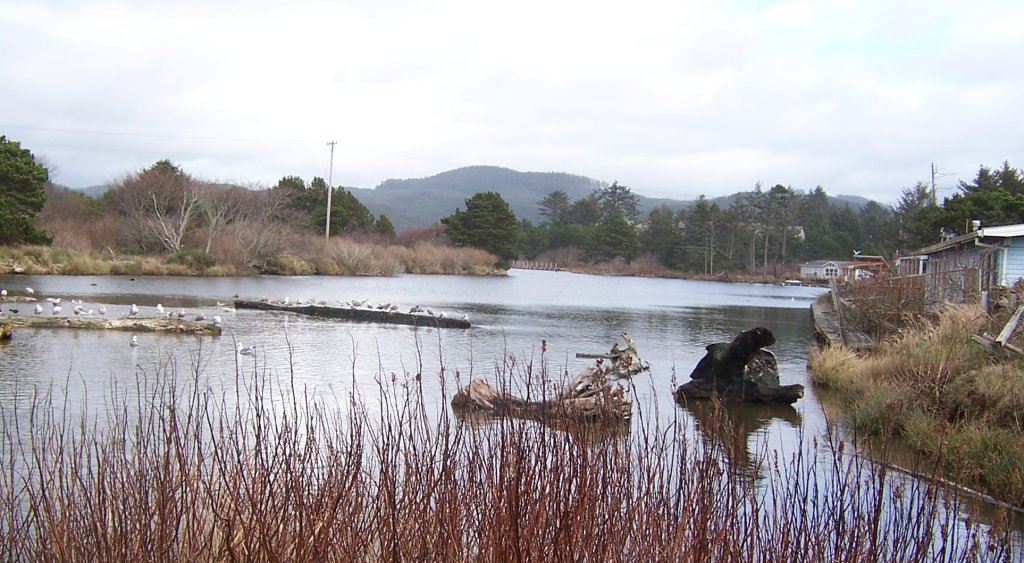
- The lake from D River

- Location within Oregon Location within the United States
- Location: Lincoln County, Oregon
- Coordinates: 44°58′57″N 123°59′32″W
- Lake type: eutrophic
- Primary inflows: Rock Creek, Thompson Creek
- Primary outflows: D River
- Catchment area: 12 sq mi (31 km^{2})
- Basin countries: United States
- Max. length: 3 mi (4.8 km)
- Max. width: 0.75 mi (1.21 km)
- Surface area: 680 acres (280 ha)
- Average depth: 8.4 ft (2.6 m)
- Max. depth: 21.1 ft (6.4 m)
- Water volume: 5,750 acre⋅ft (7,090,000 m^{3})
- Residence time: 0.15 years
- Surface elevation: 10.4 ft (3.2 m)
- Settlements: Lincoln City

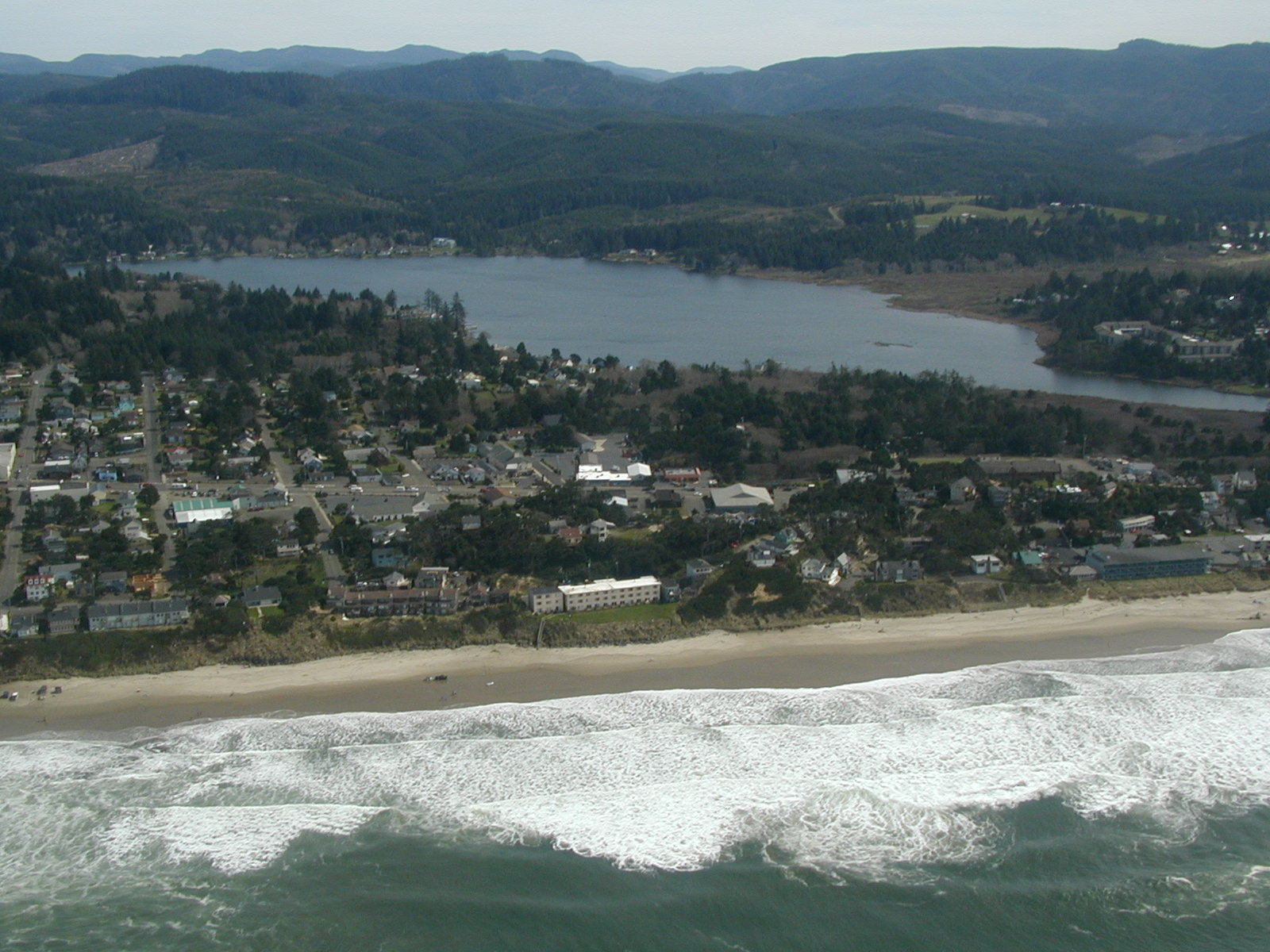
Devils Lake from above the Pacific Ocean

Devils Lake is a small lake in Lincoln County, Oregon, United States, along the Oregon Coast.

It separates the northern part of Lincoln City from the Central Oregon Coast Range. It is 1/3 of a mile wide, three miles (5 km) long, and up to 21 feet (6.4 m) deep. The 120 feet (37 m) long D River flows from the lake westward to the Pacific Ocean.

According to Oregon Geographic Names, the name derives from a Native American legend that a giant fish, giant octopus, or other large marine creature would occasionally surface, much to the dismay of anyone fishing in the vicinity.

== See also ==
- Devil's Lake State Recreation Area, a state park on the south shore of the lake
- Devils Lake (Deschutes County, Oregon)
- D River State Recreation Site, a state park along the D River
- List of lakes in Oregon
