= Curtis Island (Tasmania) =

Island in Tasmania, Australia

Coordinates: 39°28′S 146°38′E

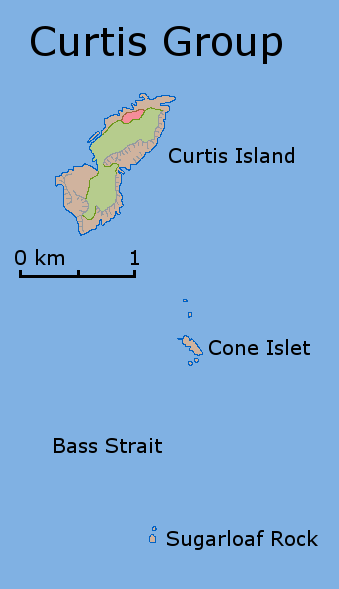
Map of the Curtis Group

Curtis Island is a granite island with an area of 150 ha. It is located in south-eastern Australia. The island is part of Tasmania’s Curtis Group, lying in northern Bass Strait between the Furneaux Group and Wilsons Promontory in Victoria. It is a nature reserve and has been identified as an Important Bird Area because it supports up to 390,000 breeding pairs of short-tailed shearwaters or Tasmanian muttonbirds.

It was named by lieutenant James Grant, sailing on the Lady Nelson, after Sir Roger Curtis, British governor of the Cape of Good Hope, in December 1800.

== Fauna ==
As well as the shearwaters, recorded breeding seabird and wader species include little penguin, fairy prion, Pacific gull and sooty oystercatcher. Reptiles present include white-lipped snake, Bougainville's skink, White's skink and metallic skink.

== See also ==
The other islands in the Curtis Group:

- Cone Islet
- Devils Tower
- Sugarloaf Rock
