= Devils Branch (Little Persimmon Creek tributary) =

Stream in Georgia, U.S.

Coordinates: 34°55′03″N 83°29′30″W

Devils Branch is a stream in the U.S. state of Georgia. It is a tributary to Little Persimmon Creek.

Devils Branch was so named on account of uneven terrain along its course.
