= Roe River =

River in the United States of America

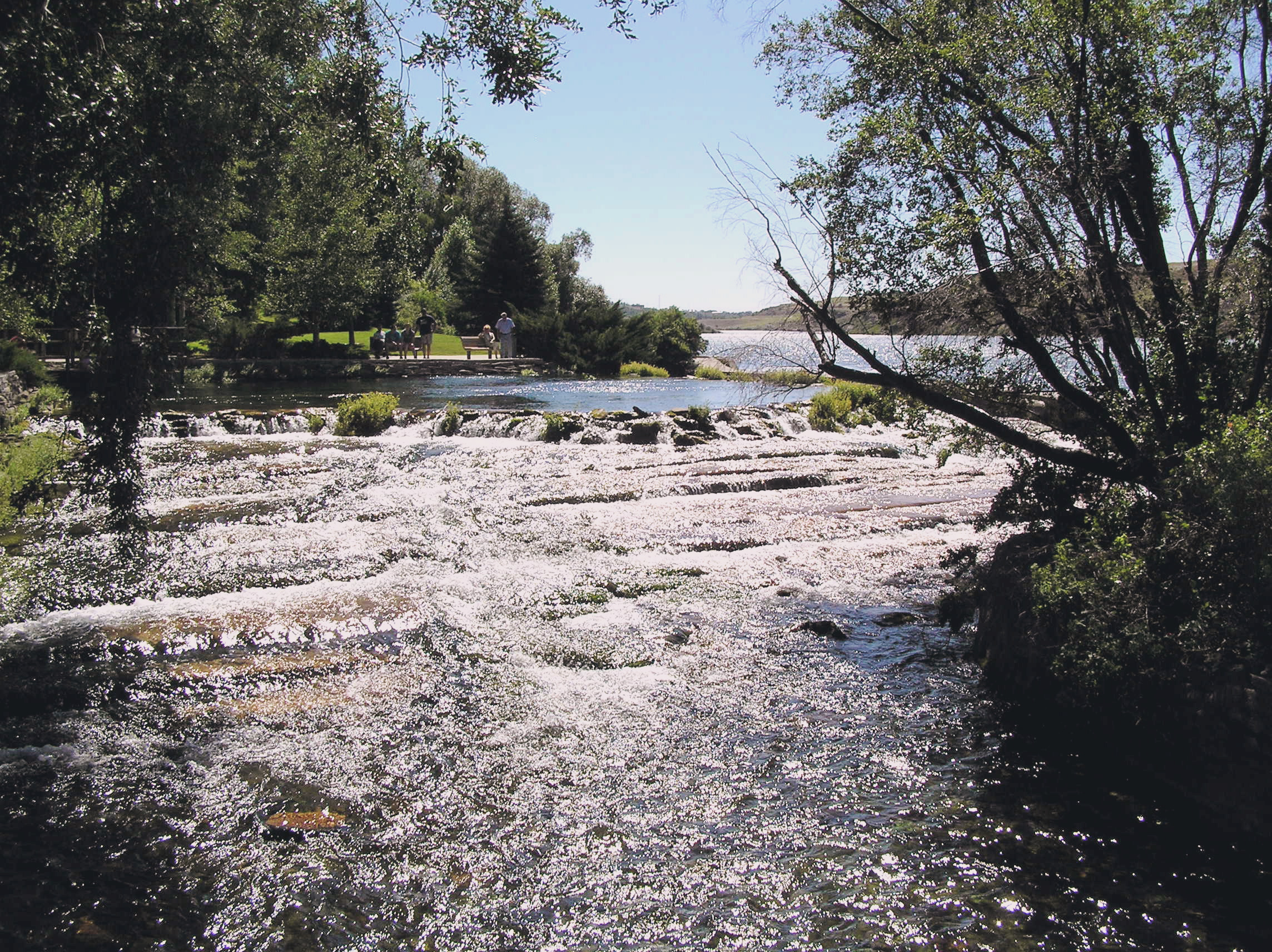
- Roe River flowing from Giant Springs

- Location of mouth in Montana

Location
- Country: United States
- State: Montana
- County: Cascade County

Physical characteristics
- Source: Giant Springs
  - coordinates: 47°32′01″N 111°13′46″W
- Mouth: Missouri River
  - coordinates: 47°32′05″N 111°13′49″W
  - elevation: 3,245 feet (989 m)
- Length: 201 feet (61 m)

The Roe River runs from Giant Springs to the Missouri River near Great Falls, Montana, United States. The Roe River is only 201 feet (61 m) long at its longest constant point, and had been named as the World's Shortest River by the Guinness Book of World Records before Guinness eliminated the category in 2006. Towards its mouth, the Roe is about 6–8 feet (1.8–2.4 m) deep.

== History ==
A successful campaign to get the Roe River recognized by the Guinness World Records as the shortest river in the world originated in 1987 with fifth-grade students of teacher Susie Nardlinger at Lincoln Elementary School in Great Falls. The river was unnamed at the time, so the students first had to petition the United States Board on Geographic Names to accept their proposed name, Roe River, then submit their proposal to Guinness. The children's name likely came from the Giant Springs Trout Hatchery adjoining the springs and which receives 650–700 US gallons (2,500–2,600 L; 540–580 imp gal) of spring water per minute used in primarily raising rainbow trout from their own roe (eggs). In 1988 future NFL football player Dallas Neil, then a student at the school, put in an appearance on The Tonight Show as part of this effort.

Previously, Oregon's D River was listed in Guinness World Records as the world's shortest river at 440 feet (130 m). This title was contested in 1989 when Guinness named the Roe River as the world's shortest. Not to be deterred, the people of Lincoln City submitted a new measurement of the D River to Guinness of about 120 feet (37 m) long, when marked at "extreme high tide".

At that time, Lincoln City's Chamber of Commerce described the Roe as a "drainage ditch surveyed for a school project". Nardlinger shot back that the D was merely an "ocean water backup", pointed out that there was an alternative fork to the Roe which was only 30 feet (9.1 m) long, and suggested that a new survey be conducted.

Guinness apparently never ruled on the dispute, leaving the claim by the Roe stand, but instead chose to no longer list a shortest river, possibly as a result of this ongoing dispute.

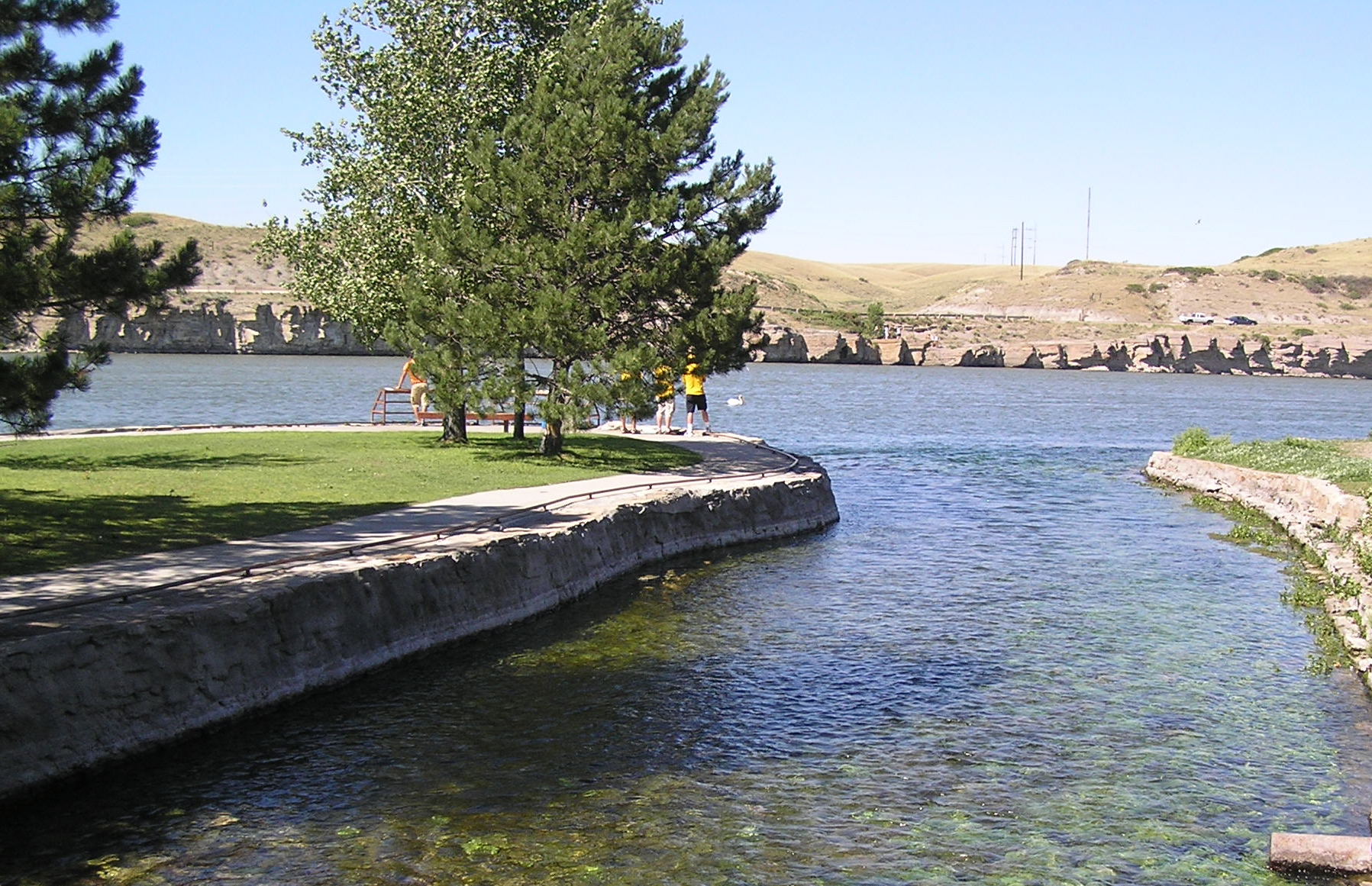
Roe River at its mouth, flowing into the Missouri River.

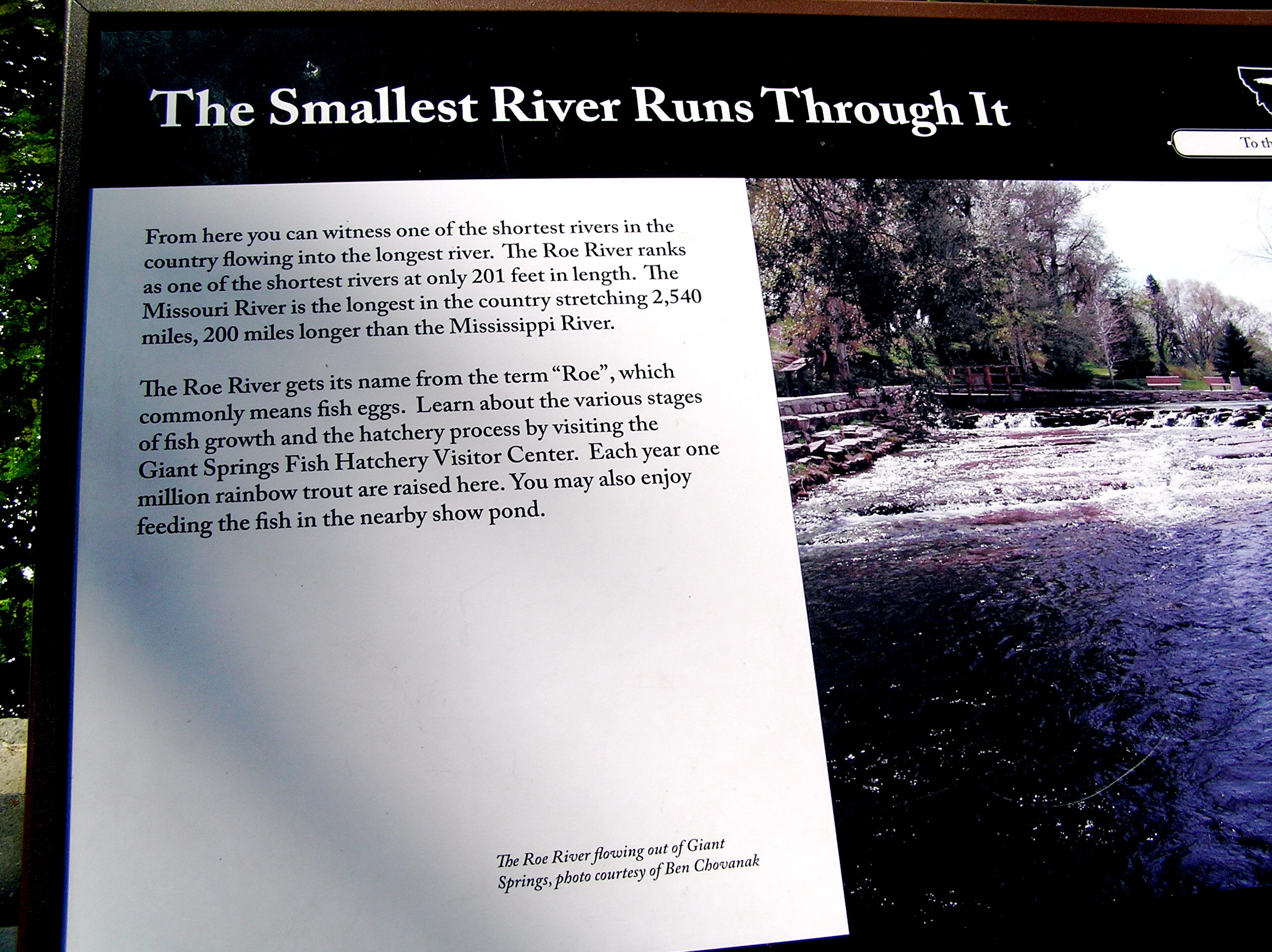
Interpretive sign at Roe River.

== See also ==
- List of rivers of Montana
