= Devils Tower (Tasmania) =

Islands of Australia

Coordinates: 39°22′S 146°44′E

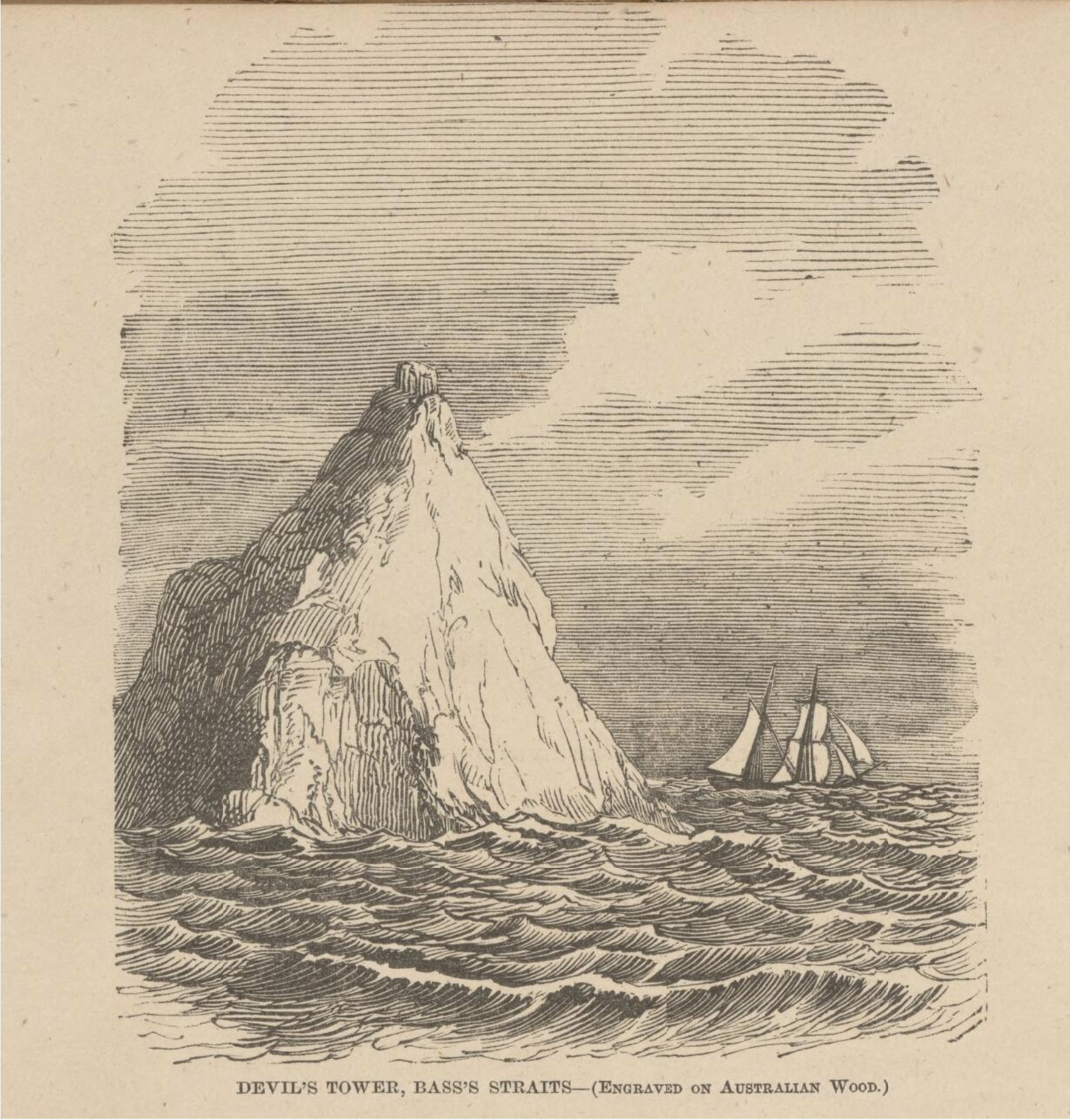
Devils Tower, Bass Strait, Tasmania – 1857 engraving

Devils Tower comprises two small and rugged granite islands, with a combined area of 4.77 hectares (11.8 acres), in south-eastern Australia. It is part of Tasmania’s Curtis Group, lying in northern Bass Strait between the Furneaux Group and Wilsons Promontory in Victoria. It is a nature reserve.

The island was sighted and named by Lieutenant James Grant on 9 December 1800 from the survey brig HMS Lady Nelson.

== Fauna ==
Recorded breeding seabird species include short-tailed shearwater, fairy prion and common diving-petrel. The metallic skink is present. The island is also used as a regular haul-out site for Australian fur seals.

== See also ==
The other islands in the Curtis Group:

- Cone Islet
- Curtis Island
- Sugarloaf Rock
