= Archenemy (disambiguation) =

Archenemy is someone's main enemy.

The term may also refer to:

- Arch Enemy, Swedish death metal band
- Archenemy Record Company
- ArchEnemies, comics
- Archenemy (Magic: The Gathering)
- ArchEnemy, a 2009 science-fiction and fantasy novel by Frank Beddor in his The Looking Glass Wars trilogy
- Archenemy (film), an American-British action film
