= Devils Branch (Runs Branch tributary) =

Stream in Georgia, U.S.

Coordinates: 32°32′18″N 81°21′47″W

Devils Branch is a stream in the U.S. state of Georgia. It is a tributary to Runs Branch.

Devils Branch was so named on account of a treacherous swamp along its course.
