= Devil's Peak =

Devil's Peak, Devils Peak, or Devil Peak may refer to:

== Mountain peaks ==
=== United States ===
- Devil Peak (Nevada)
- Devils Peak (Santa Barbara County, California)
- Devils Peak (Washington)

=== Elsewhere ===
- Devils Peak (Antarctica)
- Devil's Peak (Cape Town), South Africa
- Devil's Peak, Hong Kong
- Devils Peak (South Australia), a mountain in Australia
- Picacho del Diablo, Baja California, Mexico

== Other uses ==
- Devil's Peak (film), a 2023 American film
- Devil's Peak (novel), a 2004 novel by South African novelist Deon Meyer
  - Devil's Peak (TV series), a 2023 South African TV series based on the novel by Deon Meyer

== See also ==
- Devils Tower
- Mount Diablo (disambiguation)
