= Devil Peak (Nevada) =

Mountain in Nevada, United States

Coordinates: 35°41′50″N 115°27′11″W

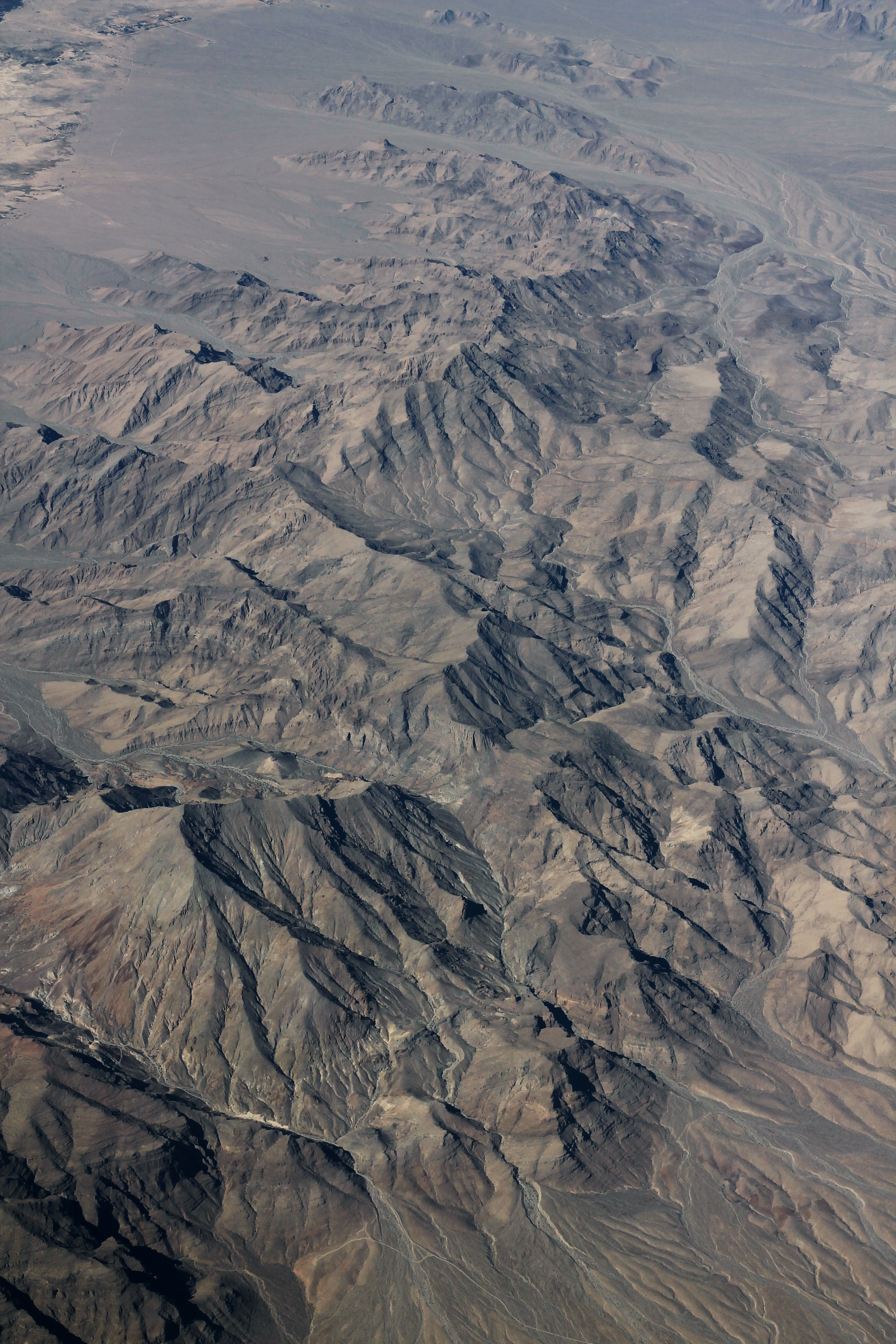
Aerial view of the mountain

Devil Peak is a summit in Mojave Desert, in the U.S. state of Nevada. The elevation is 5,856 feet (1,785 m).

The mountain's name comes from the Native Americans of the area, who named the summit "dwelling place of evil spirits". Variant names were "Big Devil", "Diablo Grande", "Lookout", "Lookout Mountain", "Lookout Peak" and "Mount Diablo".
