= Lincoln City, Oregon =

- City
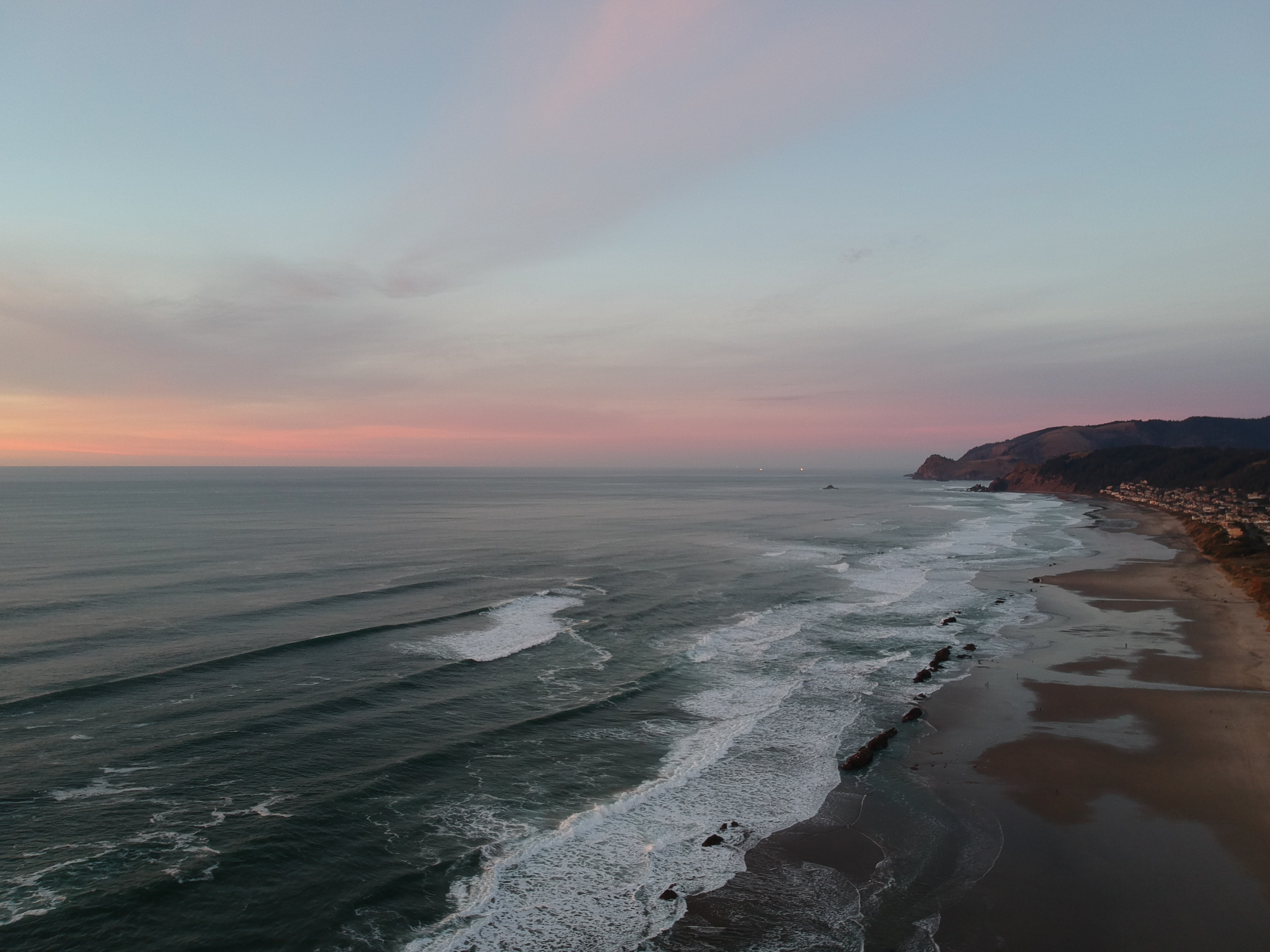
- Portion of the Lincoln City coastline looking north towards the neighborhood of Roads End
- Motto: A Great Place to Try New Things
- Location in Oregon

- Location within Oregon Location within the United States Lincoln City (North America)
- Coordinates: 44°58′31″N 124°00′26″W
- Country: United States
- State: Oregon
- County: Lincoln
- Incorporated: 1965
- Named for: Abraham Lincoln

Government
  - Type: Council-manager

Area
  - Total: 6.08 sq mi (15.76 km^{2})
  - Land: 6.05 sq mi (15.67 km^{2})
  - Water: 0.035 sq mi (0.09 km^{2})
- Elevation: 105 ft (32 m)

Population (2020)
  - Total: 9,815
  - Density: 1,622.3/sq mi (626.37/km^{2})
- Time zone: UTC-8 (Pacific)
  - Summer (DST): UTC-7 (Pacific)
- ZIP code: 97367
- Area code: 541/458
- FIPS code: 41-42600
- GNIS feature ID: 2410836
- Website: www.lincolncityor.gov

Lincoln City is a city in Lincoln County on the Oregon Coast of the United States, between Tillamook to the north and Newport to the south. It is named after the county, which was named in honor of former U.S. President Abraham Lincoln. The population was at 9,815 in the 2020 Census.

== History ==
Lincoln City was incorporated on March 3, 1965, uniting the cities of Oceanlake and Taft, and the unincorporated communities of Cutler City and Nelscott. These were adjacent communities along U.S. Route 101, which serves as Lincoln City's main street. The name "Lincoln City" was chosen from contest entries submitted by local school children. The contest was held when it was determined that using one of the five communities' names would be too controversial.

=== Communities ===
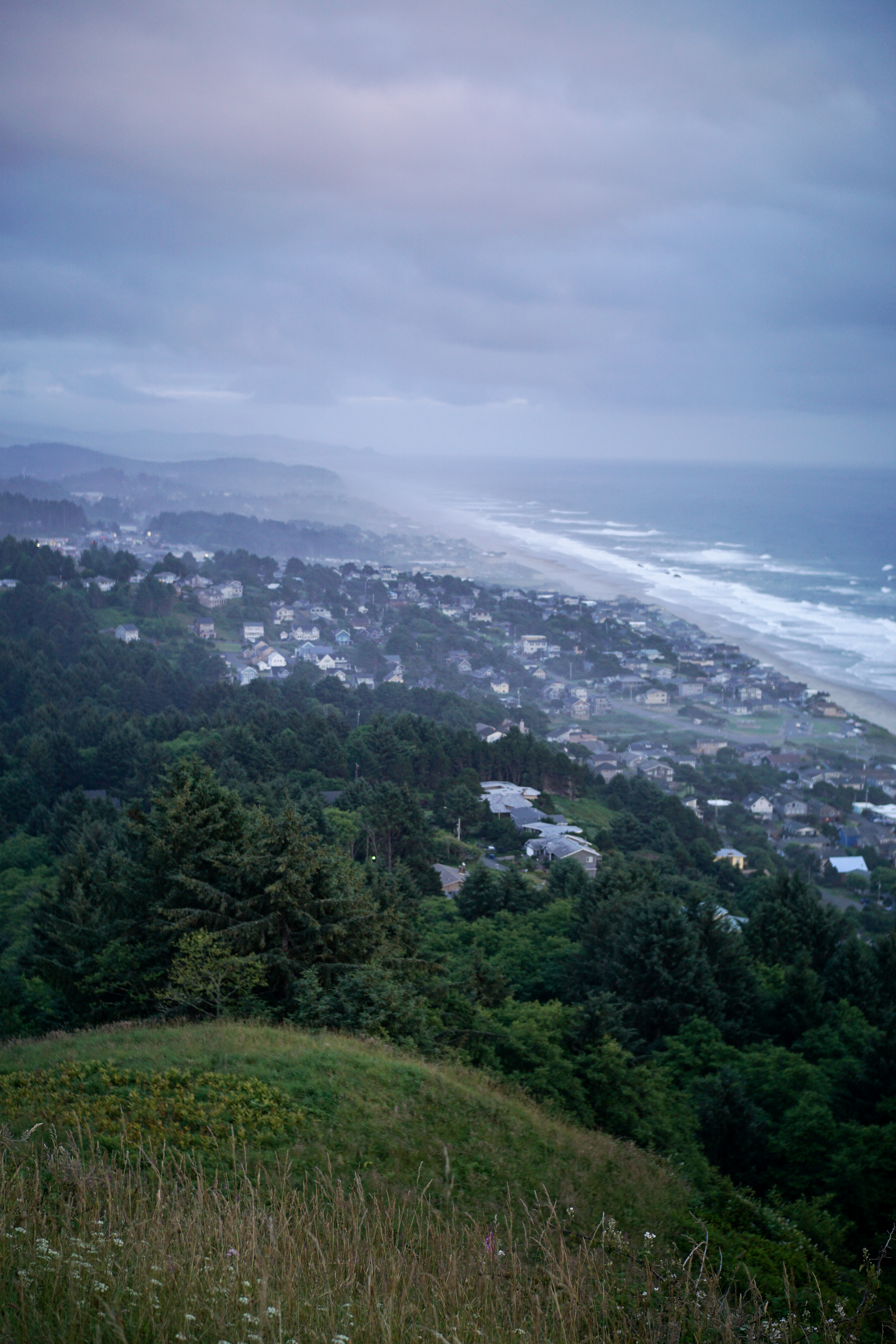
View overlooking the Roads End neighborhood of Lincoln City

==== Cutler City ====
Cutler City is located on the east shore of Siletz Bay. The community was started by Mr. and Mrs. George Cutler. It is claimed they received the property from Chief Charles "Charley" DePoe of the Siletz tribe (part of the present-day Confederated Tribes of the Siletz). Cutler City post office ran from 1930 until the formation of Lincoln City.

==== Delake ====
Delake is near Devils Lake, and was named for the way the local Finnish people pronounced the name of the lake. Delake post office was established in 1924, and reestablished as Oceanlake (see below) in 1927.

==== Nelscott ====
Nelscott was named by combining the surnames of Charles P. Nelson (1874-1946) and Dr. W.G. Scott (1882-1938), who founded the community in 1926. Nelscott post office ran from 1929 until incorporation as Lincoln City. Nelscott Reef is known for its surf and was in Surfer Magazine in 2003 as one of the Pacific Ocean's best places to surf.

==== Oceanlake ====
Oceanlake was named for its position between Devils Lake and the Pacific Ocean. Its post office ran from 1927 until incorporation as Lincoln City. In 1945, Oceanlake annexed Wecoma Beach and incorporated as a city. The neighborhood is home to Oceanlake Elementary School.

==== Taft ====
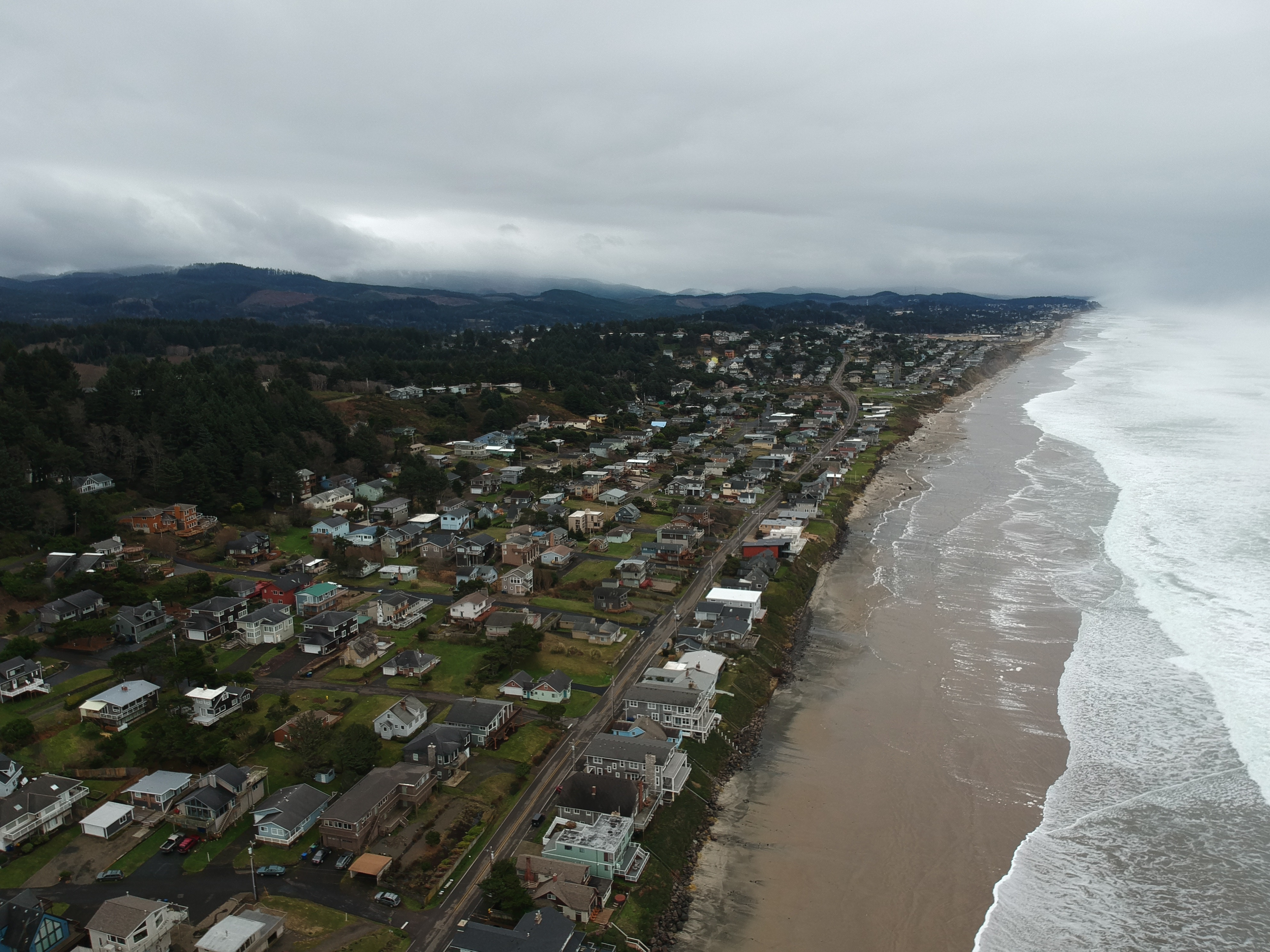
Portion of Lincoln City, Oregon between the Wecoma Beach and Roads End neighborhoods

Taft was named for the 27th U.S. president William Howard Taft. Taft post office was established in 1906, and was named when Taft was Secretary of War. The post office ran until incorporation as Lincoln City.

==== Wecoma Beach ====
Oceanlake annexed Wecoma Beach, a community to the north, and was incorporated on November 3, 1945. Wecoma is a Chinook jargon word meaning "sea". The post office at this locale was originally named Wecoma. It was changed to Wecoma Beach in 1949. The office is no longer in operation.

==== Roads End ====
On July 1, 2013, Lincoln City forcibly annexed the Roads End community to its north, by informing homeowners they would not receive water service, unless the owner consented to the annexation. The annexation also created a special zoning area for Roads End.

== Government ==
The city operates under a city charter, with a paid city manager, acting as chief executive, and a non-paid mayor who is elected for a four-year term, and six-member city council. The city council is elected from three wards and serves four-year terms.

== Economy ==
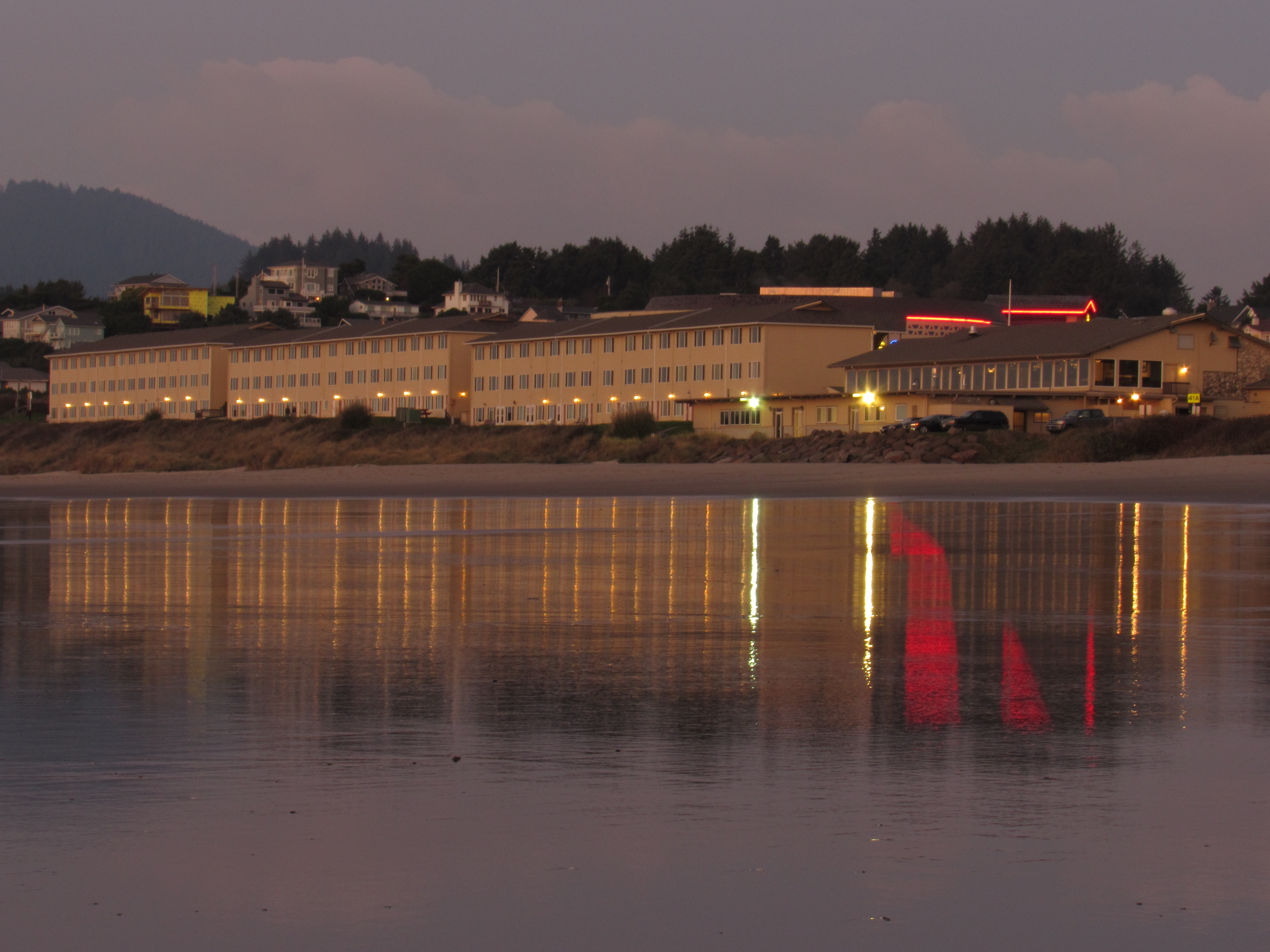
Chinook Winds Casino hotel complex from the Lincoln City beach

Lincoln City has three primary economic resources: tourism, healthcare, and retirement.

In 1995 the Confederated Tribes of Siletz opened Chinook Winds Casino at the northern end of the city on property overlooking the Pacific Ocean.

Major employers include Chinook Winds Casino, city government, Lincoln County School District, and Samaritan North Lincoln Hospital.

== Geography ==
According to the United States Census Bureau, the city has a total area of 5.68 square miles (14.71 km^{2}), of which, 5.65 square miles (14.63 km^{2}) is land and 0.03 square miles (0.08 km^{2}) is water.

Lincoln City is home to one of the world's shortest rivers, the D River, connecting Devil's Lake with the Pacific Ocean.

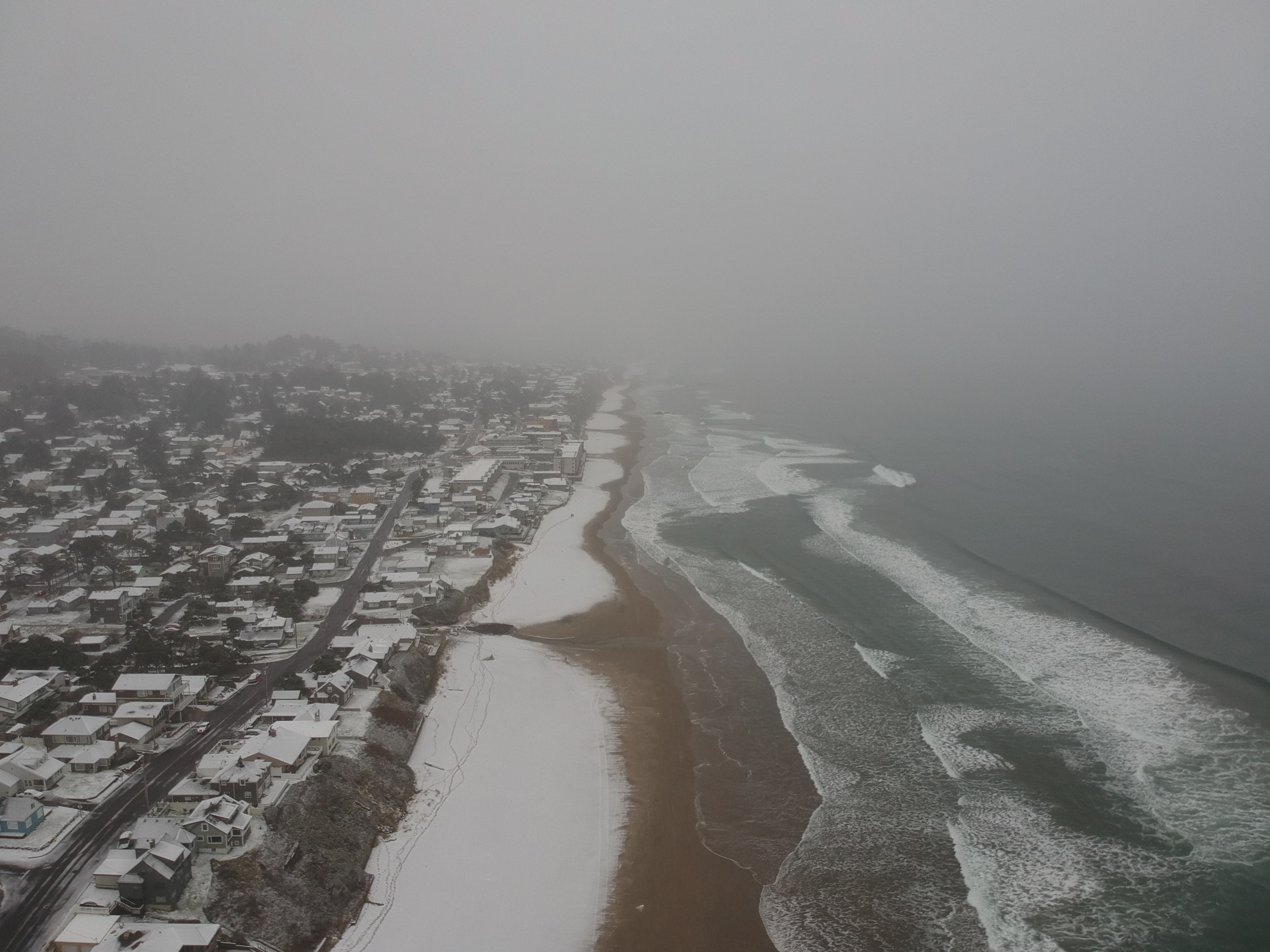
Lincoln City's coastline after light snow during February 2019

=== Climate ===
The average low temperature in December, the coldest month, is 37 °F (3 °C), and in August, the warmest month, the average high is 69 °F (21 °C). The driest month on average is July, with December the wettest. The average annual precipitation is 76.21 inches (1,936 mm). The average July afternoon humidity is 75%, and the average January afternoon humidity is 84%. The record high in Lincoln City is 100 °F (38 °C), observed on August 2, 2017, while the record low of 4 °F (−16 °C) was observed on January 31, 1950 and December 8, 1972.

Climate data for Lincoln City, Oregon
Month	Jan	Feb	Mar	Apr	May	Jun	Jul	Aug	Sep	Oct	Nov	Dec	Year
Record high °F (°C)	73 (23)	72 (22)	77 (25)	84 (29)	97 (36)	99 (37)	97 (36)	100 (38)	92 (33)	86 (30)	76 (24)	64 (18)	100 (38)
Mean daily maximum °F (°C)	50.3 (10.2)	52.7 (11.5)	54.8 (12.7)	57.3 (14.1)	61.4 (16.3)	64.5 (18.1)	68.4 (20.2)	69.4 (20.8)	68.1 (20.1)	61.6 (16.4)	53.9 (12.2)	49.2 (9.6)	59.3 (15.2)
Mean daily minimum °F (°C)	39.2 (4.0)	39.1 (3.9)	40.1 (4.5)	41.6 (5.3)	45.4 (7.4)	49.1 (9.5)	51.2 (10.7)	51.5 (10.8)	49.0 (9.4)	45.3 (7.4)	41.7 (5.4)	38.3 (3.5)	44.3 (6.8)
Record low °F (°C)	4 (−16)	11 (−12)	23 (−5)	27 (−3)	28 (−2)	35 (2)	35 (2)	39 (4)	32 (0)	23 (−5)	15 (−9)	4 (−16)	4 (−16)
Average precipitation inches (mm)	10.96 (278)	8.77 (223)	8.47 (215)	5.68 (144)	4.23 (107)	3.07 (78)	1.40 (36)	1.32 (34)	3.11 (79)	5.90 (150)	11.35 (288)	11.95 (304)	76.21 (1,936)
Average snowfall inches (cm)	1.3 (3.3)	0.2 (0.51)	0.6 (1.5)	0.1 (0.25)	0 (0)	0 (0)	0 (0)	0 (0)	0 (0)	0 (0)	0.1 (0.25)	0.4 (1.0)	2.7 (6.9)
Source 1: Averages:
Source 2: Records:

== Demographics ==
Historical population
Census	Pop.	Note	%±
1960	3,400		—
1970	4,198		23.5%
1980	5,469		30.3%
1990	5,892		7.7%
2000	7,437		26.2%
2010	7,930		6.6%
2020	9,815		23.8%
U.S. Decennial Census

=== 2020 census ===
As of the 2020 census, Lincoln City had a population of 9,815; the median age was 50.8 years, with 15.6% of residents under the age of 18 and 29.8% aged 65 years or older. For every 100 females there were 88.6 males, and for every 100 females age 18 and over there were 84.2 males age 18 and over.

100.0% of residents lived in urban areas, while <0.1% lived in rural areas.

There were 4,594 households in Lincoln City, of which 19.5% had children under the age of 18 living in them. Of all households, 37.2% were married-couple households, 18.7% were households with a male householder and no spouse or partner present, and 34.6% were households with a female householder and no spouse or partner present. About 36.8% of all households were made up of individuals and 20.5% had someone living alone who was 65 years of age or older.

There were 7,204 housing units, of which 36.2% were vacant. Among occupied housing units, 50.8% were owner-occupied and 49.2% were renter-occupied. The homeowner vacancy rate was 3.4% and the rental vacancy rate was 8.3%.

Racial composition as of the 2020 census
Race	Number	Percent
White	7,662	78.1%
Black or African American	65	0.7%
American Indian and Alaska Native	290	3.0%
Asian	197	2.0%
Native Hawaiian and Other Pacific Islander	21	0.2%
Some other race	614	6.3%
Two or more races	966	9.8%
Hispanic or Latino (of any race)	1,247	12.7%

=== 2010 census ===
As of the 2010 census, there were 7,930 people, 3,645 households, and 1,959 families residing in the city. The population density was about 1,404 inhabitants per square mile (542.1/km^{2}). There were 6,025 housing units at an average density of about 1,066 per square mile (411.6/km^{2}). The racial makeup of the city was 83.7% White, 0.4% African American, 3.5% Native American, 1.5% Asian, 0.1% Pacific Islander, 7.1% from other races, and 3.6% from two or more races. Hispanic or Latino of any race were 13.2% of the population.

There were 3,645 households, of which about 22% had children under the age of 18 living with them, about 37% were married couples living together, 12% had a female householder with no husband present, about 5% had a male householder with no wife present, and about 46% were non-families. About 37% of all households were made up of individuals, and about 16% had someone living alone who was 65 years of age or older. The average household size was 2.14 and the average family size was 2.74.

The median age in the city was about 46 years. About 18% of residents were under the age of 18; about 8% were between the ages of 18 and 24; about 23% were from 25 to 44; about 31% were from 45 to 64; and about 20% were 65 years of age or older. The gender makeup of the city was about 47% male and 53% female.

== Healthcare ==
The Samaritan North Lincoln Hospital is the only hospital in Lincoln City and has associated outpatient medical and specialty clinics. It is a 25-bed critical access hospital with a level IV trauma designation. It is part of the five hospital Samaritan Health Services healthcare system headquartered in Corvallis, Oregon. In 2020, a new hospital was constructed just east of the old hospital. There is also a Veterans Administration Community Based Outpatient Clinic, part of the VA Portland Health Care System.

== Arts and culture ==
The Lincoln City Cultural Center, housed in the historic DeLake School building, offers a wide variety of classes and events year-round.

Two kite festivals are held annually in Lincoln City, the Summer Kite Festival in June and the Fall Kite Festival in October. Both festivals are each held at D River Wayside, where several other world-class kite events are held. The city is known by some as the "Kite Capital of the World". Lincoln City also boasts year round glass float drops across its seven miles of beach thanks to the Finders Keepers program.

== Education ==
Public schools in Lincoln City are served by the Lincoln County School District.

== Media ==
Lincoln City is served by the weekly newspaper Lincoln County Leader, KBCH AM 1400 is in Lincoln City and provides Lincoln County news coverage as well as coverage of local sports.

== Notable people ==
- Ruth Dennis Grover artist and educator
- M. K. Wren author of mystery and science fiction

== See also ==
- Siletz Reef
