= Cline Buttes =

Mountains in central Oregon, US

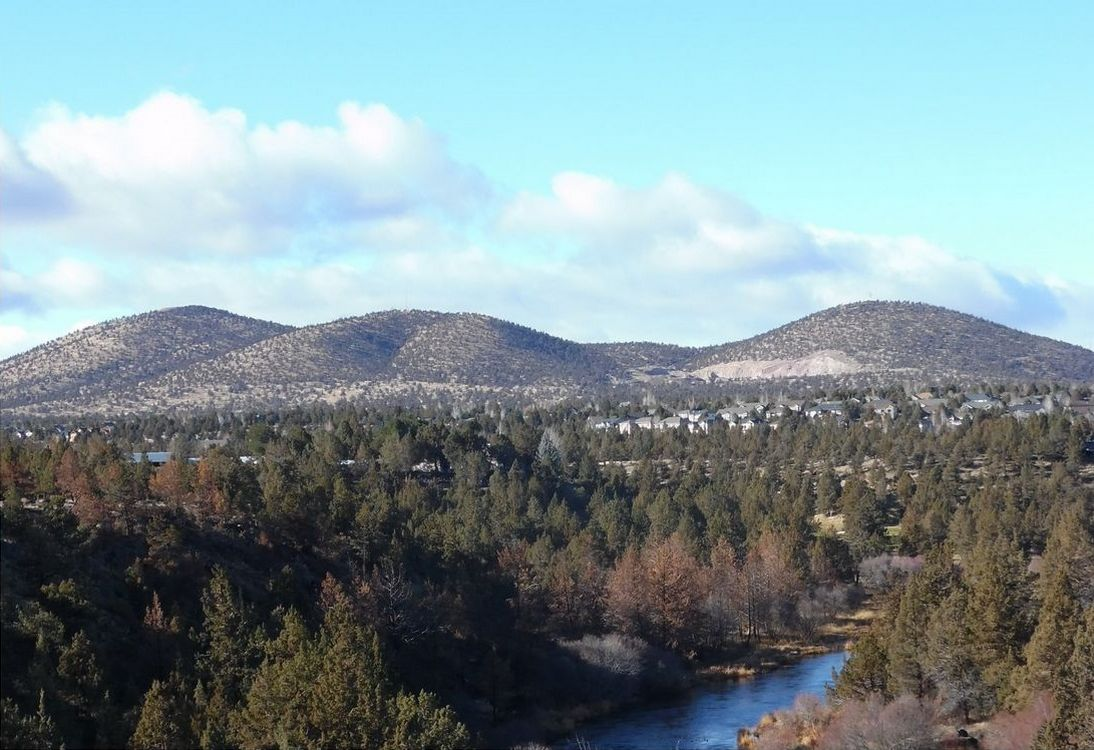
- Cline Buttes viewed from the east

Highest point
- Elevation: 4,117 ft (1,255 m)
- Coordinates: 44°15′08″N 121°18′09″W

Geography
- Location within Oregon Location within the United States
- Location: Deschutes County, Oregon
- Topo map(s): USGS Cline Falls, Oregon (44121C3)

Geology
- Rock age: Late Oligocene or early Miocene epoch
- Mountain type: Volcanic

Climbing
- Easiest route: Rough dirt road
- Normal route: Hiking or biking trails

The Cline Buttes are mountains with volcanic origins that form three dome-shaped peaks located in Deschutes County in central Oregon. They are some of the eastern foothills of the Cascade Range. Situated on land administered by the Bureau of Land Management, the buttes include the Cline Buttes Recreation Area and are flanked on the east and west sides by two separate sections of the Eagle Crest Resort. On the highest summit, there is a Federal Aviation Administration site with an aircraft navigation beacon. The mountains have several hiking trails as well as a number of popular mountain bike routes.

== Geography and geology ==
The Cline Buttes are composed of three rounded peaks. They are some of the easternmost foothills of the Cascade mountain range, located near the northwest corner of Oregon's high desert country. The mountains are in Deschutes County, approximately 7 miles (11 km) west of Redmond. Of the three crests, the southern peak is the highest. Its summit is 4,117 feet (1,255 m) above sea level. The Cline Buttes are a stand-alone mountain with the nearest higher peak 12 miles (19 km) to the south. Cline Buttes feature gentle slopes with highly conical shaped peaks.

The Cline Buttes form a silicic volcanic center, active before the emplacement of the Deschutes Formation, a late Miocene to early Pliocene volcanic lava flow deposited between 7.5 and 5.3 million years ago. Their lava flows cover a collective area of approximately 5.0 square miles (13 km^{2}), and were created as part of the John Day Formation during the late Oligocene or early Miocene epoch, approximately twenty-five million years ago. The primary rock that makes up the mountain is rhyolite with some basalt also present. Most of the rhyolite is white or light-gray. It was formed when volcanic magma cooled below the earth's surface before erupting onto the surface. There are also some obsidian flow-bands exposed in a rock quarry on the northeast flank of the mountains. The Cline Buttes have been significantly eroded over time, leaving a rounded dome shape with three separate crests. They are now covered with 10 to 20 inches (25 to 51 cm) of sandy loam soil in most areas with rhyolite and basalt outcropping on the steeper slopes. The rhyolite lava flow deposits at Cline Buttes show a roughly porphyritic texture, with oligoclase phenocrysts making up between 1 and 2 percent of the minerals. These flows have been devitrified and show a normal-polarity magnetization. Cline Buttes volcanoes also produced rhyodacite, which varies in color from light gray to red-brown and are similarly sparsely porphyritic. The basalt lava flows produced a now-weathered hill on the western flank of the Buttes, which is not topped by rhyodacite and therefore likely formed after that lava erupted, despite having a lower relative elevation.

== Environment and ecology ==
To the west of the Cline Buttes are woodlands covered with western juniper transitioning to ponderosa pine, lodgepole pine, and fir forest. The forest extends to the timberline on the central Cascade peaks, approximately 22 miles (35 km) away. The area south and east of the mountain is drier. It is typical of Oregon's high desert country dominated by juniper and sagebrush.

The slopes of the Cline Buttes are covered by an old-growth juniper forest with an understory dominated by low sagebrush. Rabbitbrush is also a common understory shrub on the slopes. Low groundcover plants includes Granite Gilia, rough eyelash, Longleaf hawksbeard, and bunch grass.

The Cline Buttes and the surrounding area host a wide variety of wildlife. Larger mammals found in the area include black-tailed deer, elk, coyotes, black bear, bobcats, and cougars. Smaller mammals include American badgers, striped skunks, black-tailed jackrabbits, white-tailed jackrabbits, mountain cottontails, Belding's ground squirrels, golden-mantled ground squirrels, and least chipmunks.

Birds common to the Cline Buttes area include mountain chickadee, American goldfinch, lesser goldfinch, Black-headed grosbeak, mountain bluebird, Steller's jay, northern flickers, and black-billed magpie. Birds of prey found in the area include golden eagles, red-tailed hawks, northern harriers, and prairie falcons. While prairie falcons are uncommon in most parts of central Oregon, the area around the Cline Buttes has a native breeding population. To protect these birds, some areas around the Cline Buttes are closed to humans activities several months each year.

== Human use ==
=== History ===
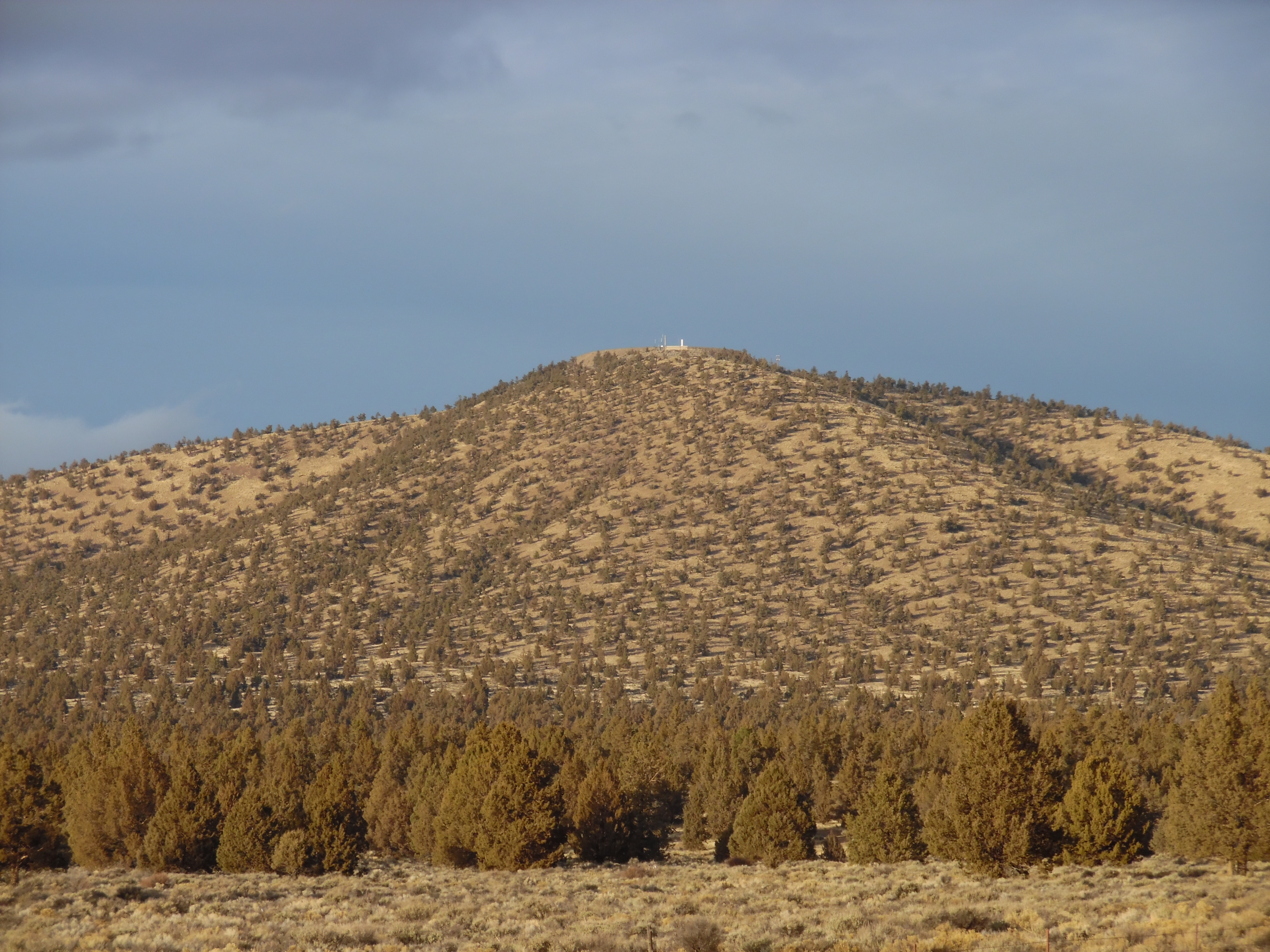
Navigation beacon on south peak

The area known today as Cline Buttes was originally occupied by bands of the Warm Springs peoples, who moved seasonally between villages to find game, roots, berries, and salmon. White settlers began arriving in numbers in the early-mid 1800s, and eventually Joel Palmer, superintendent of the Oregon Territory, received orders in 1855 to remove the Indians from their lands. Under the Treaty of 1855, the Warm Springs and Wasco tribes relinquished approximately ten million acres of land, including Cline Buttes, but reserved the Warm Springs Reservation for their exclusive use and also kept their rights to harvest fish, game, and other foods off the reservation in their usual and accustomed places.

The Cline Buttes were named in honor of Doctor Cass A. Cline (1850–1926), a pioneer dentist and early land developer in central Oregon. Cline immigrated to Oregon as a child in 1853, settling in the Willamette Valley. He moved to central Oregon in 1871. In 1886, he filed a homestead land claim along the Deschutes River, near the buttes that now bear his name. A nearby waterfall on the Deschutes River, northeast of the buttes, is also named after the dentist.

Later, Cline attempted to establish a town along the west bank of the Deschutes River, near the foot of the Cline Buttes. At its peak, the town of Cline Falls had a post office, a school, two stores, two hotels, a newspaper, a power plant, and 500 residential lots for sale. However, the community eventually failed when the first railroad route through the area was built on the opposite side of the river, through the neighboring town of Redmond.

In 1904, gold was discovered on the Cline Buttes by Otto Retzlaff and C. P. Becker. The first gold ore was found in a ledge outcrop on the south flank of the mountain. More than 50 mining claims were quickly filed. However, when the ore was assayed it was found to be uneconomical to extract, so mining operations never got underway.

In 1985, development of Eagle Crest Resort began along the Deschutes River, east of the Cline Buttes. The original development was on the east side of the Cline Falls Highway. In 1996, Eagle Crest began selling residential lots west of the Cline Falls Highway, between the highway and the eastern base of the Cline Buttes. This development was completed in 1993. Later, a third phase of Eagle Crest housing was developed along the northwestern base of the Cline Buttes. This area is separated from the Eagle Crest's second development by approximately one mile of Bureau of Land Management property. There is a paved easement road that connects the two areas, running along the northern base of the mountain.

Today, the Bureau of Land Management administers the Cline Buttes and much of the land around the mountain. The bureau has established Cline Buttes Recreation Area, a 32,000-acre (130 km^{2}) area that is being developed for a wide range of recreational uses. A service road runs up the south side of the mountain and then along the upper west flank to the main summit. The road supports a Federal Aviation Administration facility located at the summit. The facility houses a radio beacon used for aircraft navigation. There is also a road running along the east flank of the mountain. It leads to a rock quarry located on the northeast side of the mountain.

=== Recreation ===
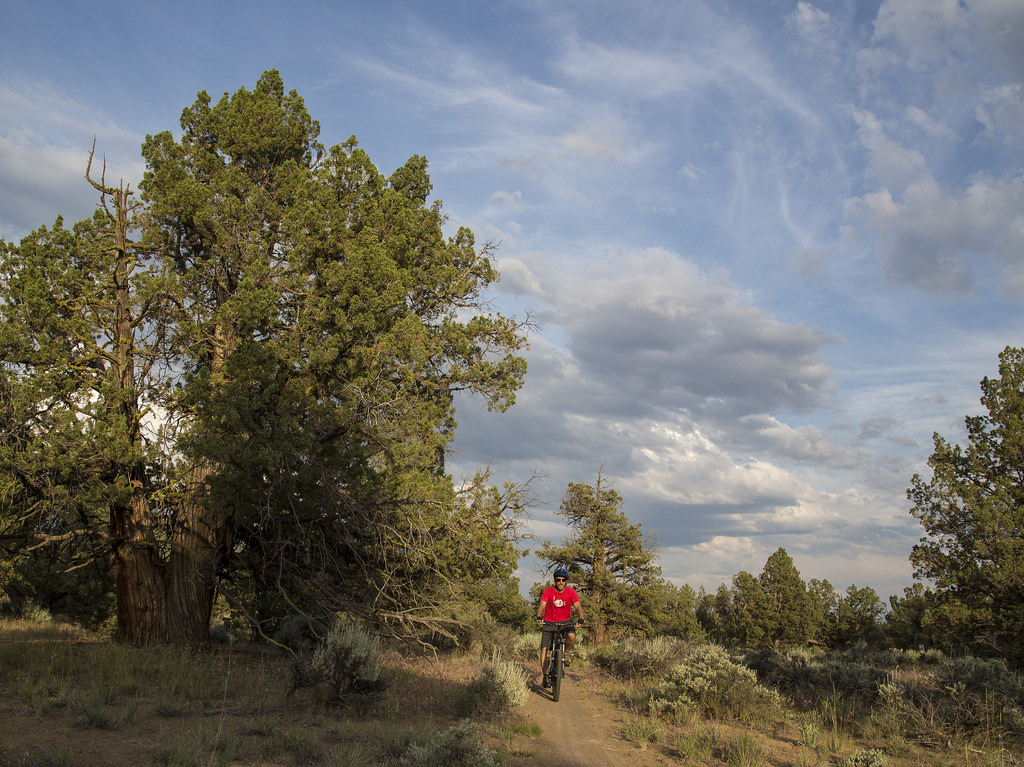
Mountain bike trail on Cline Buttes

In the summer, recreation opportunities in the Cline Buttes area include hiking, horseback riding, mountain biking, bird watching, and scenic viewing. There are separate mountain trails for hikers, mountain bikes, and horseback riding. During the winter, the area is usually available for some recreation activities since snow accumulation on and around the mountain is not abundant in most years.

The Cline Buttes are particularly well known for their mountain bike trails. Several of the bike trails are narrow single-track paths that follow the slope around the buttes to vista points. There are also two downhill trails that start at the top of the highest peak. These are extremely challenging routes with very steep rocky sections and are recommended for expert bikers only. Many of the lower trails are narrow with occasional downhill jumps, suitable for bikers with intermediate-level skills. In 2026, 11-plus miles of new trails were added on the buttes and adjacent areas, including beginner trails and trails re-routed to avoid private land and sensitive conservation land.

From the summit of the Cline Buttes, visitors have an excellent view of Cascade peaks to the west as well as the high desert country of Deschutes and Crook counties to the east. Visitors can see as far north as Mount Hood and as far south as Mount Bachelor from the Cline Buttes' highest summit. To the west are the central peaks of the Cascade Range, dominated by the Three Sisters. To the northeast lies Smith Rock State Park, and farther to the east are the Powell Buttes and the Ochoco Mountains. From the summit, the views to the south and southeast are of the lower sections of the Cline Buttes Recreation Area located on the Matson Plateau west of the Deschutes River with Pilot Butte and Paulina Peak in the distance.
