= Melissa Sanders =

Melissa Sanders may refer to:

- Melissa Sanders, character played by Amy Irving in "The Theatre" for Rod Serling's Lost Classics
- Melissa Sanders, character played by Ashley Holliday on Hollywood Heights (TV series)
- Melissa Sanders, subject of an investigation by The Smoking Gun of James Frey's memoir A Million Little Pieces
- Melissa Sanders (victim) (died 1992), American murder victim
