= Ghosts of Highway 20 =

Murder and rape cases in Oregon

U.S. Route 20 in Oregon, also called Highway 20, an east–west route though Oregon

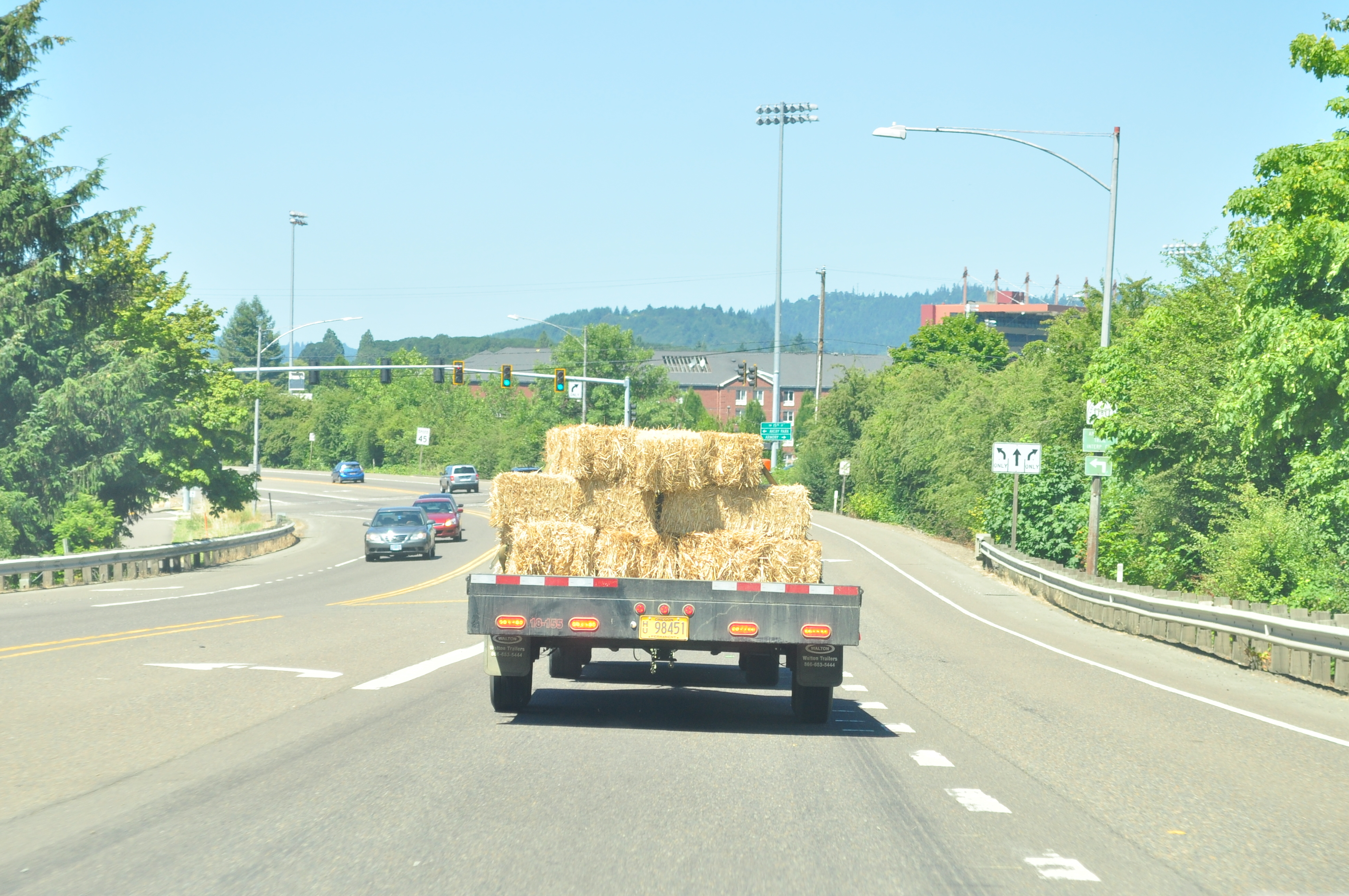
U.S. Highway 20, Corvallis, Oregon

The Ghosts of Highway 20 were individuals who disappeared, or were victims of assault, rape and/or murder, along Highway 20 in the U.S. state of Oregon from the late 1970s to the early 1990s. John Arthur Ackroyd, a highway mechanic with the Oregon Department of Transportation, was a suspect in these cases. Detectives were able to prosecute the murder of Kaye Turner of 1978, for which he was sentenced to five life sentences for aggravated murder. Ackroyd pleaded no contest in the murder of his stepdaughter Rachanda Pickle and agreed to not seek parole for the murder of Turner. A case was developed against Ackroyd for the murders of Melissa Sanders and Sheila Swanson, but Ackroyd died before the case could be presented to the Lincoln County, Oregon grand jury. Marlene Gabrielsen was the only known victim to have lived and is the first known victim. Her case was not prosecuted.

The title was adopted by The Oregonian, which published the cold-case stories of the forgotten women who disappeared along the route. The team that worked on the multiple-part series were reporter Noelle Crombie, video editor and producer Dave Killen, and photojournalist Beth Nakamura. It is also the title of the album The Ghosts of Highway 20 by Lucinda Williams.

== Marlene Gabrielsen ==
In the late spring of 1977, 20-year-old Marlene Gabrielsen went to Sisters, Oregon for the rodeo with her husband. The rodeo was in Deschutes County, ninety miles from their home in Lebanon, and was her first night out since she had given birth to her baby girl three months earlier. She and her husband got in a disagreement and he wanted to split off with some friends. Marlene wanted to go back home.

I thought there was nothing wrong... all I knew it was just a beat-up old truck and I was going home to my kid... I noticed that there was no like covers on the doors. There was no handles, and no roll-you-down thing… didn't even faze me that this was a trap.

— Marlene Gabrielsen, of her ride with John Arthur Ackroyd

John Arthur Ackroyd gave her a ride, during which she fell asleep. One hour later, he pulled off the highway onto an old wagon road. He held a knife to her neck and dragged her into the woods where he ripped off her jeans, cut off her underwear and boots with the knife. He then raped her. After she pleaded to be taken to her home and her baby, he decided to drive her to her mother-in-law's house in Lebanon. Gabrielsen was careful to preserve evidence and asked for the police to be called. She described him as someone big and burly who may have worked in the woods. Although the evidence, including the rape kit and her bruised body, supported her story, the police did not prosecute Ackroyd. She was interviewed again after other women and girls went missing or were killed. She is believed to have been Ackroyd's first victim.

== Kaye Turner ==
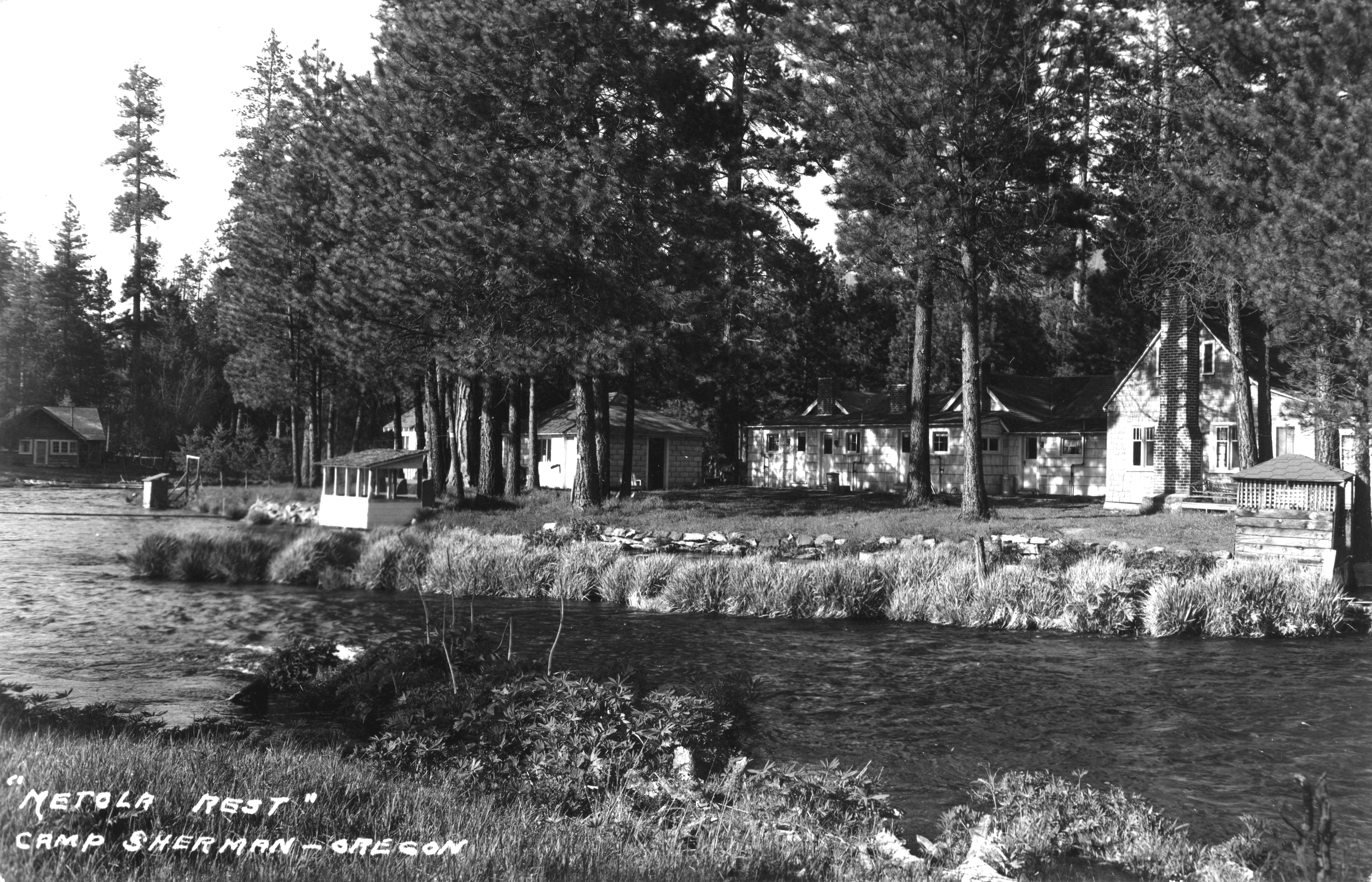
Metola Rest, Camp Sherman, Oregon

Kaye Turner spent the Christmas holiday of 1978 with her husband and their friends at Camp Sherman, Oregon in central Oregon. Kaye, 35, and her husband were from Eugene, Oregon. She was staff resources manager of the Lane County Office of Community Health and Social Services. That year, Turner completed marathons and climbed Three Fingered Jack and Mount Washington.

On Christmas Eve, she went on a run by herself before breakfast at about 8:15 a.m. She embarked on a run expected to take one hour along a two-lane camp road. Thomas Hanna, a state highway worker who lived at Camp Sherman, spotted her running south and he also saw another highway worker, John Ackroyd. Her husband Noel Turner drove through Camp Sherman looking for his wife when she had not returned by 10 a.m. Fearing his wife had been kidnapped, he phoned the police and a search was organized. The police originally suspected Noel in his wife's disappearance due to her extramarital affairs with two men. They interviewed Ackroyd who got off of work at 6:30 a.m. He was based in Santiam Junction, Oregon and drove to Camp Sherman, about 25 miles from work. He said that he planned on hunting coyotes. Ackroyd mentioned that he had seen a runner in a clearing, but the police did not consider him a suspect.

During the searches for Turner, two sets of footprints were found in the frozen snow. One matched Turner's Nike shoes. The other set was consistent with footprints of a large man. The scene indicated that there had been a scuffle and the smaller person being dragged away.

In August 1979, Ackroyd reported that he had found Turner's remains in the woods, about a half mile off the road that she had been running along. She had been kidnapped, raped, and killed. Police were surprised that Ackroyd had claimed the remains were of Kaye Turner, because little was found of her besides scraps of her clothes and scattered bones. He also said that he was the last person to see her. Over time, he disclosed that he talked with her before picking up another man, Roger Dale Beck, who was a friend and fellow hunter who lived in the Camp Sherman area. Ackroyd said that he saw her remains two months after her disappearance, but did not report the sighting. It was not until Ackroyd's step-daughter Rachanda Pickle went missing in 1990 that the police began to earnestly investigate Ackroyd and collect new information.

Ackroyd and Beck were indicted by a Jefferson County grand jury and arrested in 1992. Ackroyd was convicted in October 1993 of aggravated murder in the rape, murder and shooting of Turner for which he received a life sentence. Beck, who bragged to his family about killing Turner, was also found guilty in November 1993 of the aggravated murder of Kaye Turner by a Jefferson County Circuit jury at a separate trial. Testimony from Beck's ex-wife, Pam Ramirez, and new forensic testing are credited with helping prosecute the case. Jefferson County District Attorney Bill Hanlon said that Ackroyd had tried to get the reward for finding Turner. If he had been silent, "this case would have gone nowhere".

== Rachanda Pickle ==
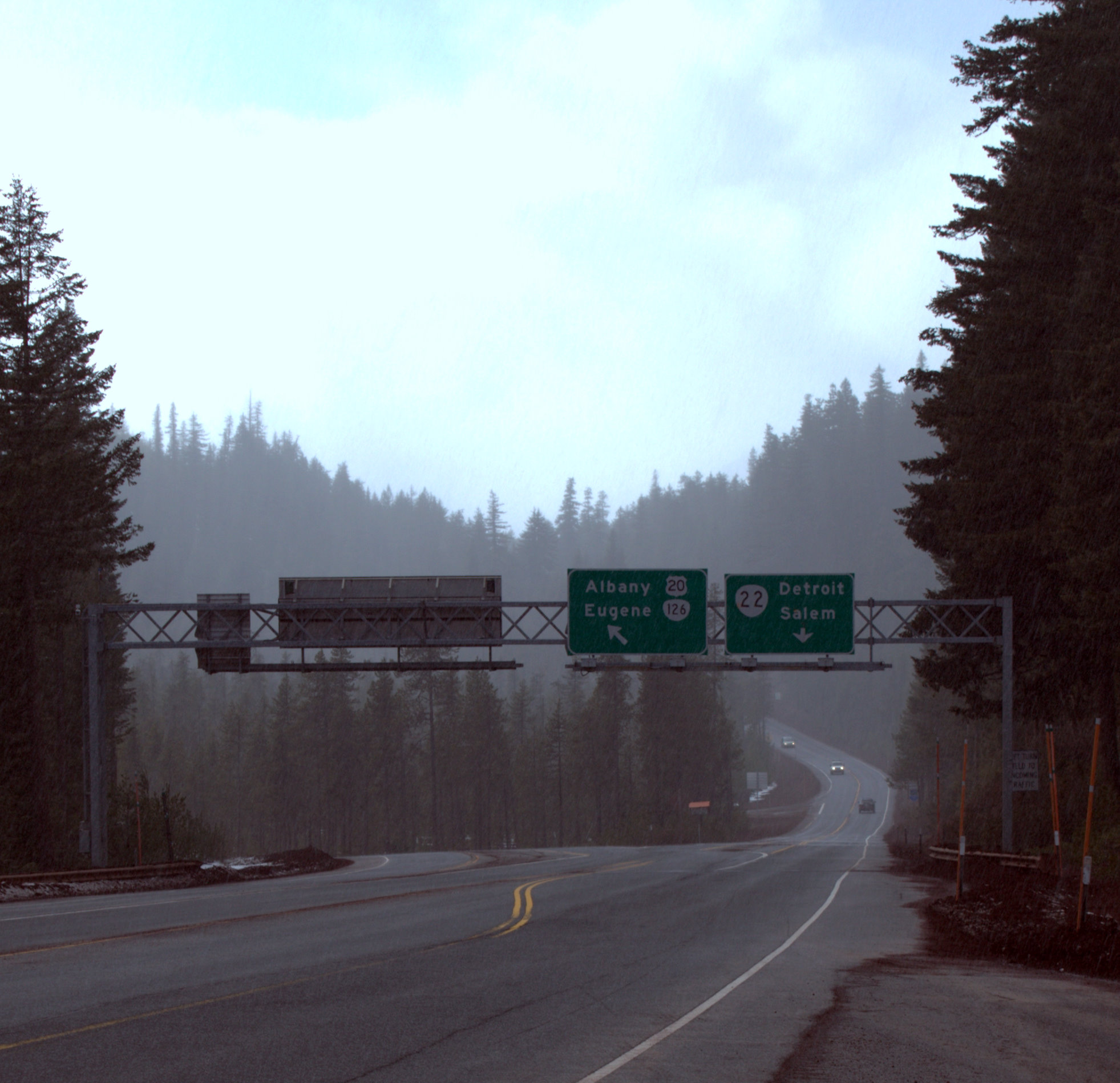
Santiam Junction, Oregon

13-year-old Rachanda Pickle was the daughter of Linda Pickle who married Ackroyd in the mid-1980s. They lived at Santiam Junction at Oregon 22 and U.S. Highway 20, where state highway work crews lived. The area is remote and there were no children her age there. She was bussed to school. Ackroyd was physically and sexually abusive to her. One day Rachanda was left at home alone. Ackroyd decided to take the day off and he returned home in the morning. She was never seen again. A massive search was conducted by 100 police officers from seven counties, but was unsuccessful in finding any leads to Rachanda's disappearance. Assumed to be dead, searches for her continued into 1993.

After compiling evidence including a number of interviews, police arrested Ackroyd and he was charged with Rachanda's murder in April 2014. He entered a plea deal. According to Linn County District Attorney Doug Marteeny, his office reached a deal with Byron Pickle, the victim's brother, that placed the prosecution of the murder on hold "in a manner that would ensure that Mr. Ackroyd would remain in prison until his death." Ackroyd pleaded no contest and agreed not to seek parole, meaning that he would die in prison.

== Melissa Sanders and Sheila Swanson ==
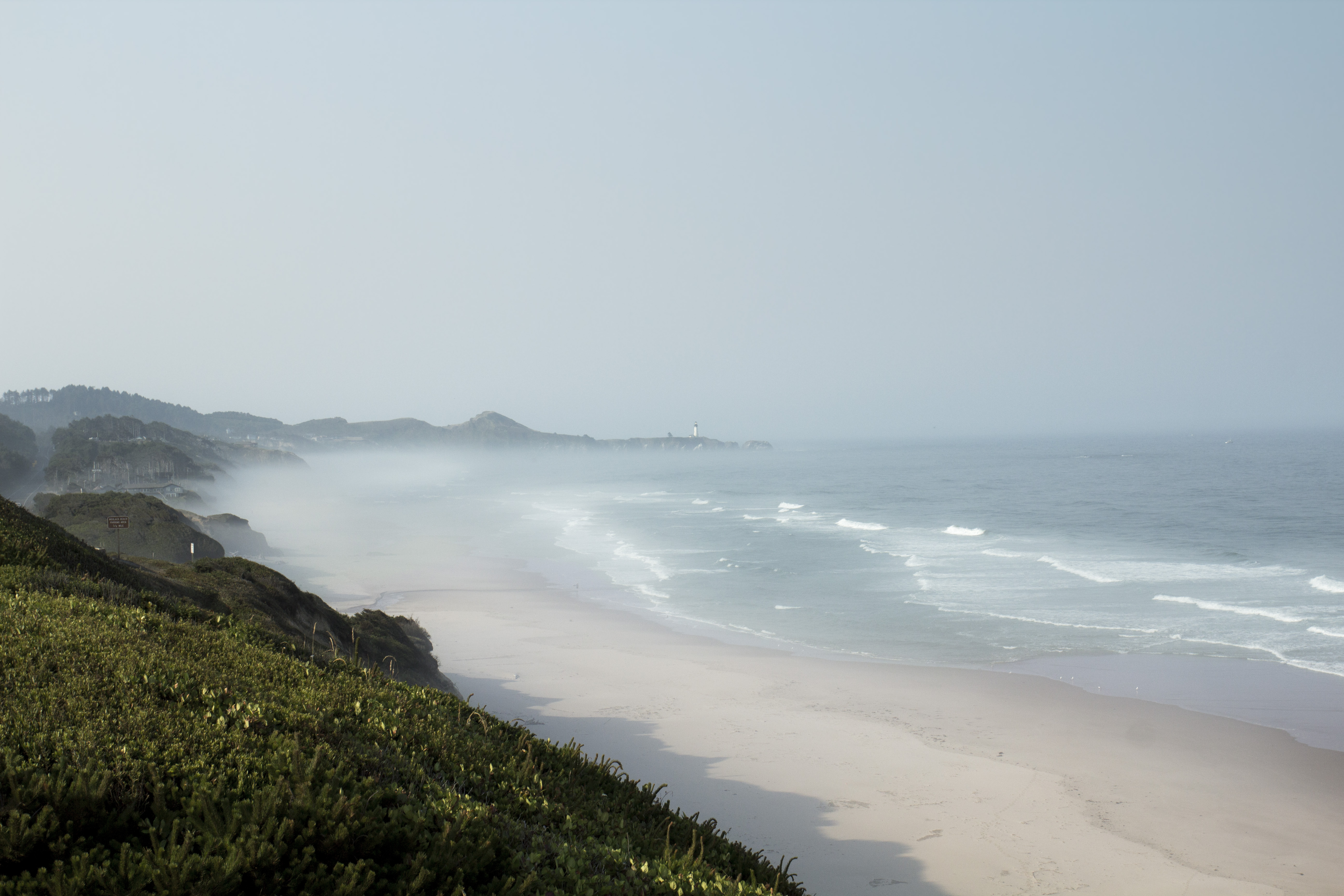
Beverly Beach State Park, Oregon

Melissa Sanders, 17, and Sheila Swanson, 19, had been on a camping trip at Beverly Beach State Park with the Sanders family in the spring of 1992. The girls became bored and had decided to hitchhike. When the Sanderses woke in the morning, the girls were gone and presumed to have had friends bring them back to Sweet Home.

The girls lived inland off of Highway 20, where they frequented a Shari's restaurant. Ackroyd, who was also a frequent customer at the restaurant, was suspected to have been involved in their disappearance. The night of the girl's disappearance, Ackroyd had returned to the state highway shop in Sweet Home covered in blood, which he stated belonged to a deer he had encountered and had to "gut…out.” When asked what happened to the deer's carcass, Ackroyd said that he had thrown it in the brush near where he worked along Highway 20 between the coast and Sweet Home.

Local hunters found Sanders's and Swanson's bodies near an old logging spur off of Highway 20. They were among a number of women and girls who disappeared along Oregon's coast. Five teens disappeared from Lincoln County on Oregon's coast alone between 1984 and 1995. Melissa and Sheila's bodies were found about a month before Ackroyd was charged for the murder of Kaye Turner. Ackroyd declined to be interviewed by the police in the Sanders and Swanson case. There was no forensic evidence that tied Ackroyd to the murder of the girls, but investigators found that Ackroyd had met them earlier and offered them a ride. They also learned that he had once invited them to a party that he said he was hosting near Newport and the campground that they stayed at in 1992. Ackroyd was also seen three times near where the girls bodies were found on a logging road off of Highway 20.

Ron Benson, an investigator for the Lincoln County District Attorney's Office, connected the cases of Marlene Gabrielsen in 1977 with the case of Kaye Turner in 1978, as well as the disappearance of Ackroyd's stepdaughter, Rachanda, in 1990, and Melissa and Sheila's murders in 1992. Police reopened the 1992 case in 2012 with Benson and Linda Snow investigating. Benson determined that there were similarities between the disparate cases and evidence against Ackroyd, such as the killer not having buried victims’ remains, Ackroyd taking time off around the time of the crimes, and the connection to wildlife and hunting in his statements about what he was doing at the time of the crimes. Investigators located the men who had seen Ackroyd arrive very late after his shift and covered in blood. They then had enough evidence for a grand jury. Since Ackroyd was already in prison and it would be expensive to prosecute the case, the case was closed.

== Further cases ==
Police have tied the four homicide and one assault and rape cases to Ackroyd, and also believe him to have been responsible for a number of others in the area, at the time he was suspected to have been active.

A moss hunter in Linn County at Sweet Home, Oregon discovered the unidentified skeletal remains of a woman on July 24, 1976, along Highway 20 close to Swamp Mountain Road. For decades, her identity could not be established, and she was referred to by authorities as the Swamp Mountain Jane Doe. In August 2025, Oregon State Police said they had used genetic genealogy to confirm the identity of the remains as Marion Vinetta Nagle McWhorter. McWhorter had disappeared in fall 1974 at age 21 while hitchhiking from California to Alaska. Her last known location was when she called her aunt from a pay phone in Tigard, Oregon, around 100 miles from where the remains were discovered. McWhorter's aunt later recalled her saying that she was going to hitch a ride from a man in a white pickup.

14-year-old Rodney Lynn Grissom and 15-year-old Karen Jean Lee were last seen in 1977 in Cornelius, Oregon on May 24 and 26 respectively. Authorities believe Grissom left with Lee intending to hitchhike to California, only to disappear two days after taking off. The two teens called a friend from a payphone in Lebanon, Oregon after leaving home, which was cut short when Karen said, "Our ride is here. I have to go." Karen and Rodney were never seen again. Later that year, in Linn County, Oregon, close to Highway 20, some of the couple's possessions were discovered. The items included Rodney's watch and some of his other belongings, along with Karen's trousers, some notebook pages, and a blouse that she had made. Karen's jeans looked like they had been cut.

The unsolved Cline Falls axe attack occurred on June 22, 1977, approximately 10 miles north of Highway 20, at Cline Falls State Park in unincorporated Deschutes County.

Elizabeth Mussler, 22, vanished in downtown Lebanon in the summer of 1977. The following year, her bones were discovered in a shallow grave in the woods near Green Peter Reservoir's Thistle Creek exit on Highway 20 in Linn County.

On April 27, 1978, another unidentified woman's skull was found in a wooded area off of U.S. Route 20 in eastern Linn County, Oregon. It was initially speculated that this decedent was the missing woman Karen Lee, but this was eventually ruled out. The victim remains unidentified and is known by authorities as the Linn County Jane Doe.

On August 27, 1978, at 7 a.m., two men from Milton-Freewater, Oregon were hunting in the Finley Creek Cow Camp close to Elgin when they came across skeletal remains at a nearby grave. The remains were spread around, and the skull appeared to be sticking out of the grave. She had been buried face down in the shallow grave. She was also pregnant, and estimated to have been in the sixth to the eighth month of her pregnancy. She is known as Finley Creek Jane Doe.

In 1986, two Forest Service workers found a partial human skull, some additional bone fragments and one tooth near Government Camp off U.S. 26 on Mount Hood in Clackamas County, Oregon. The skull was not identified at the time until when the Oregon State Medical Examiner's Office got a grant to begin DNA analysis on more than 100 sets of unidentified human remains, including the Mount Hood skull. Genealogical investigation and DNA testing on the skull identified Wanda Ann Herr, aged 19, as a potential match. Authorities were able to identify her by finding her living sisters. When Herr vanished in June 1976, she was residing in a group home in Gresham, Oregon. As no missing persons report had been made at the time, it was assumed that she had been a runaway.

== See also ==
- Freeway Phantom
