= Cline Falls State Scenic Viewpoint =

State park in Oregon, United States

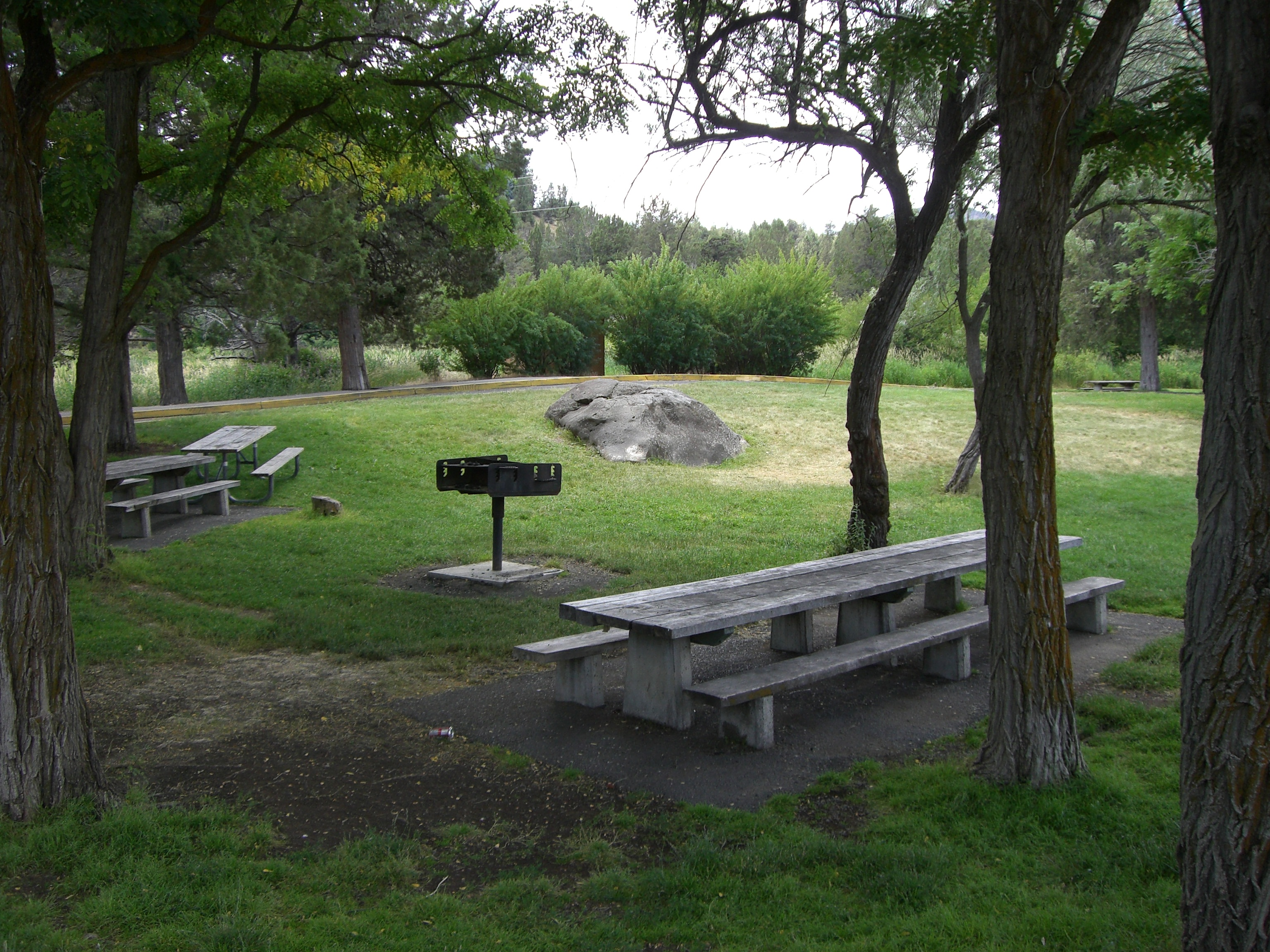
- Picnic area at Cline Falls park

- Location within Oregon Location within the United States
- Interactive map of Cline Falls State Scenic Viewpoint
- Type: Public, state
- Location: Deschutes County, Oregon
- Nearest city: Redmond
- Coordinates: 44°16′07″N 121°15′21″W
- Area: 9 acres (3.6 ha)
- Operator: Oregon Parks and Recreation Department

Cline Falls State Scenic Viewpoint (also known as Cline Falls State Park) is a state park near Redmond, Oregon, United States. It is located on the Deschutes River. The park covers 9 acres (36,000 m^{2}). It is administered by the Oregon Parks and Recreation Department.

== Cline Falls ==
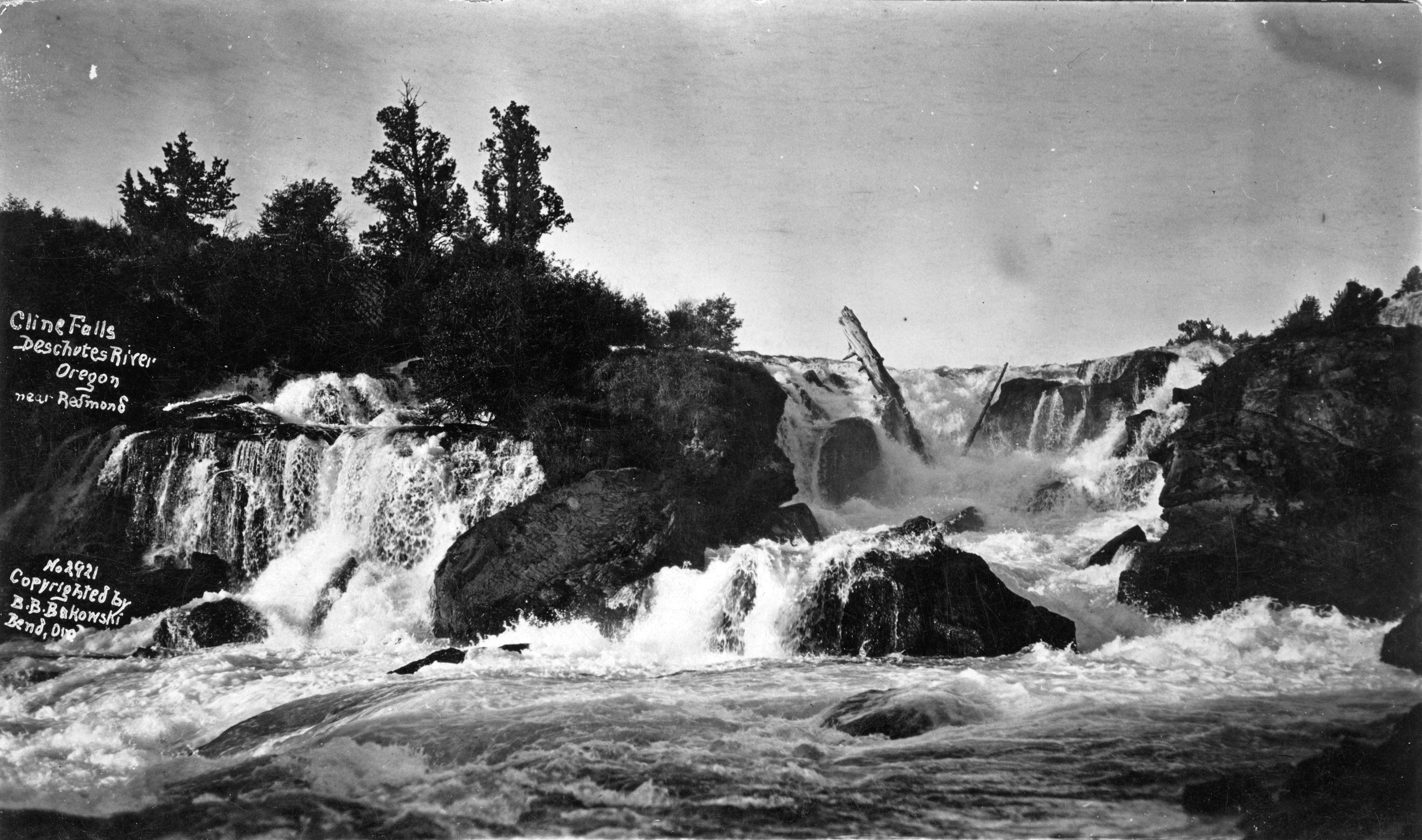
Special Collections image of Cline Falls.

Cline Falls is located on the Deschutes River approximately four miles west of Redmond, Oregon. The falls were named for Doctor Cass A. Cline (1850–1926) a Redmond dentist, who owned the land adjacent to the falls. The falls occur just north of the point where Highway 126 crosses the Deschutes River. In the 1950s, the Oregon Parks and Recreation Department acquired property above Cline Falls to create a day use park.

== Park grounds ==
Cline Falls State Scenic Viewpoint is a day use park that covers 9 acres (36,000 m^{2}) on the east side of the Deschutes River. It is located on the south side of Highway 126. Because Clines Falls is a short distance north of the highway, the falls are not within the park boundary.

The park has a large open lawn surrounded by ponderosa pine, western juniper, poplar, and locust trees that extend to the river's edge. The park also includes riparian habitat, sagebrush covered uplands, and canyon rimrocks. These areas are home to blackbirds, canyon wrens, American dippers, song sparrows, and finches. Other song birds pass through the area during the spring and fall migrations. Prairie falcons and golden eagles are also found in the Cline Falls area.

As it flows by the park, the Deschutes River alternates between small rapids and calm pools. The rapids pass around several very large boulders. The calm sections create wetlands along the shore that attract a variety of wildlife. Canada geese and other water fowl are common in the wetlands along the river. Some small mammals including the Great Basin pocket mouse and sagebrush voles are found in the park as well.

== Recreation ==
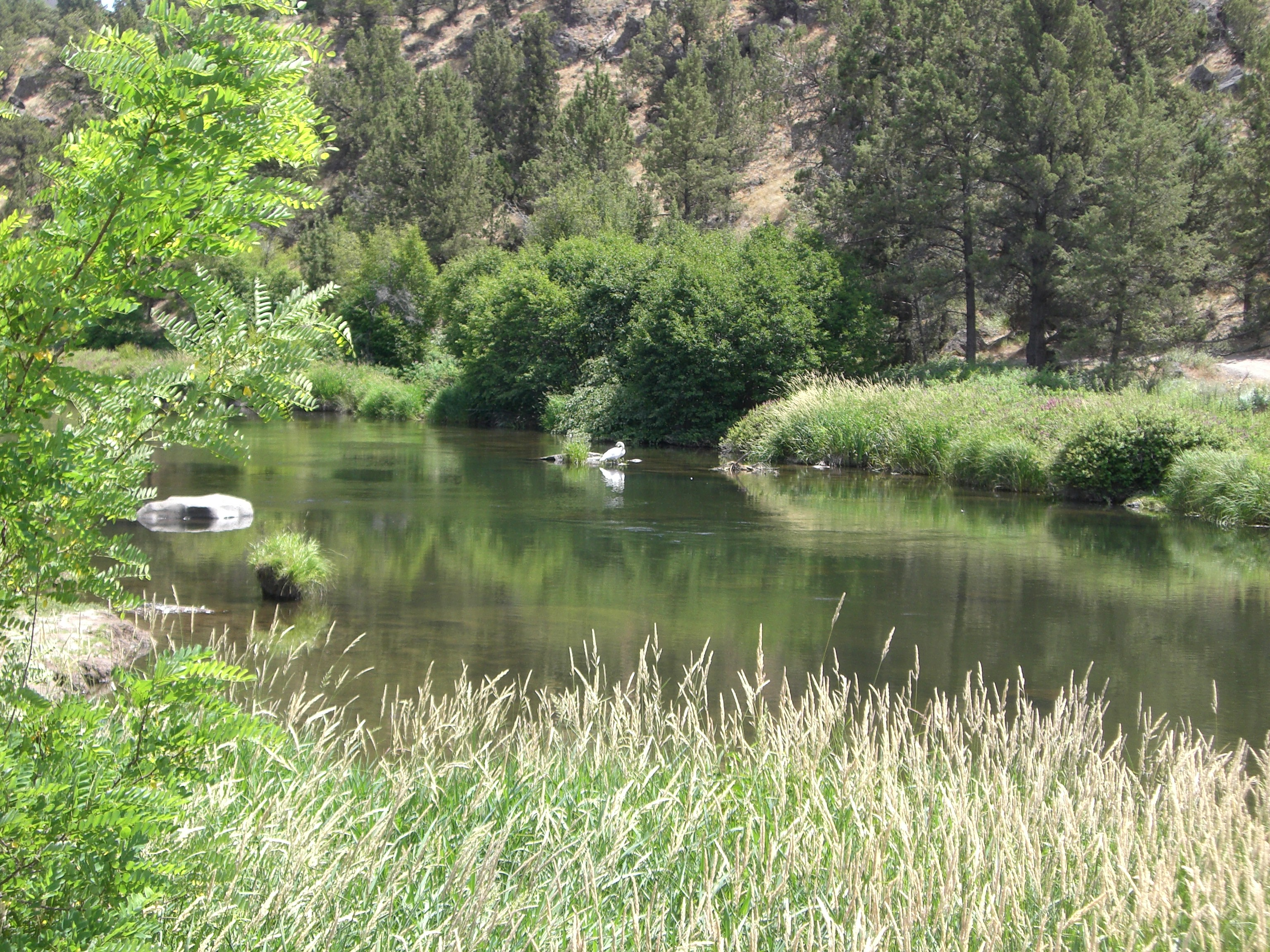
The Deschutes River at Cline Falls State Park

Since it is the closest riverfront park to the city of Redmond, Cline Falls State Scenic Viewpoint is a popular recreation site for residents. A large open lawn is available for group games and relaxing in the sun; however, most visitors come to the park to picnic and swim. The park offers a variety of swimming areas ranging from deep, calm pools to shallow coves. There are also short stretches of swift water for inner tubing.

The park provides fishing access to the Deschutes River. The pools and eddies near large river rocks provide good habitat for trout; fishermen can find native rainbow trout, brown trout, and bull trout in the Cline Falls area.

The Deschutes River provides excellent rafting, kayaking, and canoeing opportunities. One of the longer paddle trips on the Deschutes is a 14.5-mile (23.3 km) section of the river beginning at Tumalo State Park and ending at Cline Falls State Park. Another popular run begins at Cline Falls State Park and runs 11.5 miles (18.5 km) downriver to the Lower Bridge Recreation Site. This run requires a portage around Cline Falls, which is located about a half mile downstream from the park.

Cline Falls State Scenic Viewpoint is closed during the winter months. When it is open, there is no charge for using the park. Alcohol is not permitted in the park at any time. The ban on alcohol is enforced by the Deschutes County Sheriff's Department. Park facilities include:

- Public restrooms with flush toilets
- Picnic tables
- Barbecue grills
- Horseshoe pits
- Fish-cleaning station

== Unsolved crime ==
On 22 June 1977, two undergraduate students from Yale University, Shayna Weiss and Terri Jentz, were attacked and badly injured in Cline Falls State Park. The two women were biking cross-country from Astoria, Oregon to the East Coast. On the seventh day of their trip, they camped at Cline Falls State Park. In the middle of the night, a truck drove over their tent with the two campers inside. Then the driver got out of the truck and attacked the students with an axe. After striking them a number of times, the attacker stopped and drove away. Both students survived. However, their attacker was never caught. One of the survivors later wrote a book about the ordeal, entitled Strange Piece of Paradise.

== See also ==
- List of Oregon state parks
