= Strange Piece of Paradise =

2006 non-fiction book by Terri Jentz

Strange Piece of Paradise: A Return to the American West to Investigate My Attempted Murder—And Solve the Mystery of Myself
- Cover of the 2006 Farrar, Straus and Giroux edition
- Author: Terri Jentz
- Language: English
- Publication date: 2006

Strange Piece of Paradise: A Return to the American West to Investigate My Attempted Murder—And Solve the Mystery of Myself is a 2006 non-fiction book (ISBN 978-0374134983) by the American writer Terri Jentz, detailing her experience as a victim of the Cline Falls axe attack.

== Synopsis ==
Terri Jentz and her friend Shayna Weiss (a pseudonym) are Yale students bicycling across America in 1977. On June 22, 1977, after stopping to camp at Cline Falls State Park in Oregon, they are brutally attacked when a man runs over the tent in which they are sleeping with a high-clearance pick-up truck and assaults them with an ax. Despite their injuries, both survive. Weiss suffers partial blindness and memory loss, and distances herself from the author. Jentz, her body scarred, bears her injuries mostly in guilt, anger, and fear.

To help confront these feelings, Jentz returns to the area fifteen years later to investigate the crime even though the statute of limitations on attempted murder prevents her attacker's prosecution. During her investigation, she meets other victims of violent crimes and their advocates, who help her follow the most promising lead: a man whom locals have always suspected is the perpetrator.

She learns that he, too, obsesses about the incident, frequently talking about the crime, and she even observes his polygraph session, in which he is asked about the attack on Jentz and Weiss, and attends his trial (which results in his conviction and sentencing for charges related to a different crime). However, she never speaks with him.

For Jentz, the value of this exercise has been to break out of "the claustrophobic confines of [her] memories."

== Television interviews ==
- Jentz told part of her story in an interview for C-SPAN2 BookTV on 23 March 2007. The caption for the C-SPAN video indicates that Jentz is an activist for Equality Now.
- Jentz was interviewed in the 20/20 episode "Survivors", that first aired 26 August 2009 on WE tv.
- Her story featured in Language of Anger, Forgiveness: A Time to Love and a Time to Hate, a PBS Video which premiered on 17 April 2011.

== Book reviews ==
- Strange Piece of Paradise - The New York Times Book Review

== See also ==
- Bikecentennial, Jentz and Weiss were following the Oregon Trail
- Libertarian, the philosophy Jentz said characterized many people she met in Oregon, and (she surmised) contributed to her case's and other violent crimes against women's not being solved

== Awards and honors ==
Edgar Allan Poe Award: Nominee
