= John Arthur Ackroyd =

American serial killer

- Born: John Arthur Ackroyd; October 3, 1949; Sweet Home, Oregon, U.S.
- Died: December 30, 2016 (aged 67); Oregon State Penitentiary, Salem, Oregon, U.S.
- Occupation: Former Highway worker
- Conviction: Murder
- Penalty: Life imprisonment

Details
- Victims: 2–7+
- Span of crimes: 1977–1992
- Country: United States
- State: Oregon
- Date apprehended: June 12, 1992
- Imprisoned at: Oregon State Penitentiary

John Arthur Ackroyd (October 3, 1949 – December 30, 2016) was an American murderer and serial killer. In 1992, he was sentenced to five life terms in prison for the abduction and murder of Kaye Turner.

== Biography ==
Ackroyd was raised in the small logging town of Sweet Home, Oregon. His father worked as a maintenance worker and his mother as an office worker at the police department in Sweet Home. He had an older and a younger sister. During his school years, he was a loner who was bullied. His high school diploma indicated that he had been a "special education" student. He enlisted in the Army after having been accused of felony theft. He worked overseas as a mechanic and was caught stealing equipment.

In 1977, he began working for the Oregon Department of Transportation, called the state highway department at the time, along U.S. Route 20 that ran east to west across Oregon. He was responsible for clearing wrecks, helping people whose cars broke down on the highway, and maintenance. He married Linda Pickle in the mid-1980s. She had two children, Rachanda and Byron. They lived at Santiam Junction, a state highway division compound at the junction of an Oregon 126, Oregon 22, and U.S. Highway 20. Other highway workers lived there, but there were few children. After one year, the couple divorced, but they continued to live together with Linda's children. Ackroyd was abusive to both Byron and Rachanda. Rachanda disappeared on July 10, 1990.

His life had changed by early 1992. His relationship with Linda ended and he moved in with his mother in Sweet Home. Due to his connection with Rachanda's disappearance, many women at Santiam Junction were uncomfortable with his behavior and he began to work out of Corvallis.

== Attacks and murders ==
In 1977, Ackroyd raped Marlene Gabrielsen. In 1978, along with an accomplice, Roger Dale Beck, he abducted and murdered Kaye Turner. Beck was also found guilty in the murder of Kaye Turner at a separate trial. Ackroyd's step-daughter Rachanda Pickle went missing in 1990. Ackroyd was charged with Rachanda's murder in 2013 and pleaded no contest. Sheila Swanson and Melissa Sanders were murdered in 1992 in Lincoln County, Oregon. Just weeks later Ackroyd was arrested for the murder of Kaye Turner. Investigators Ron Benson and Linda Snow, with the Lincoln County District Attorney's Office, were preparing to present the evidence against Ackroyd for the murders of Swanson and Sanders to the grand jury when Ackroyd passed away. The Oregonian newspaper and others have alleged that Ackroyd was involved in the murder of several more women.

== Custody ==
Ackroyd was incarcerated in Oregon State Penitentiary. He died in prison in 2016.

== See also ==
- List of serial killers in the United States
