= Cline Falls axe attack =

1977 crime in Oregon, United States

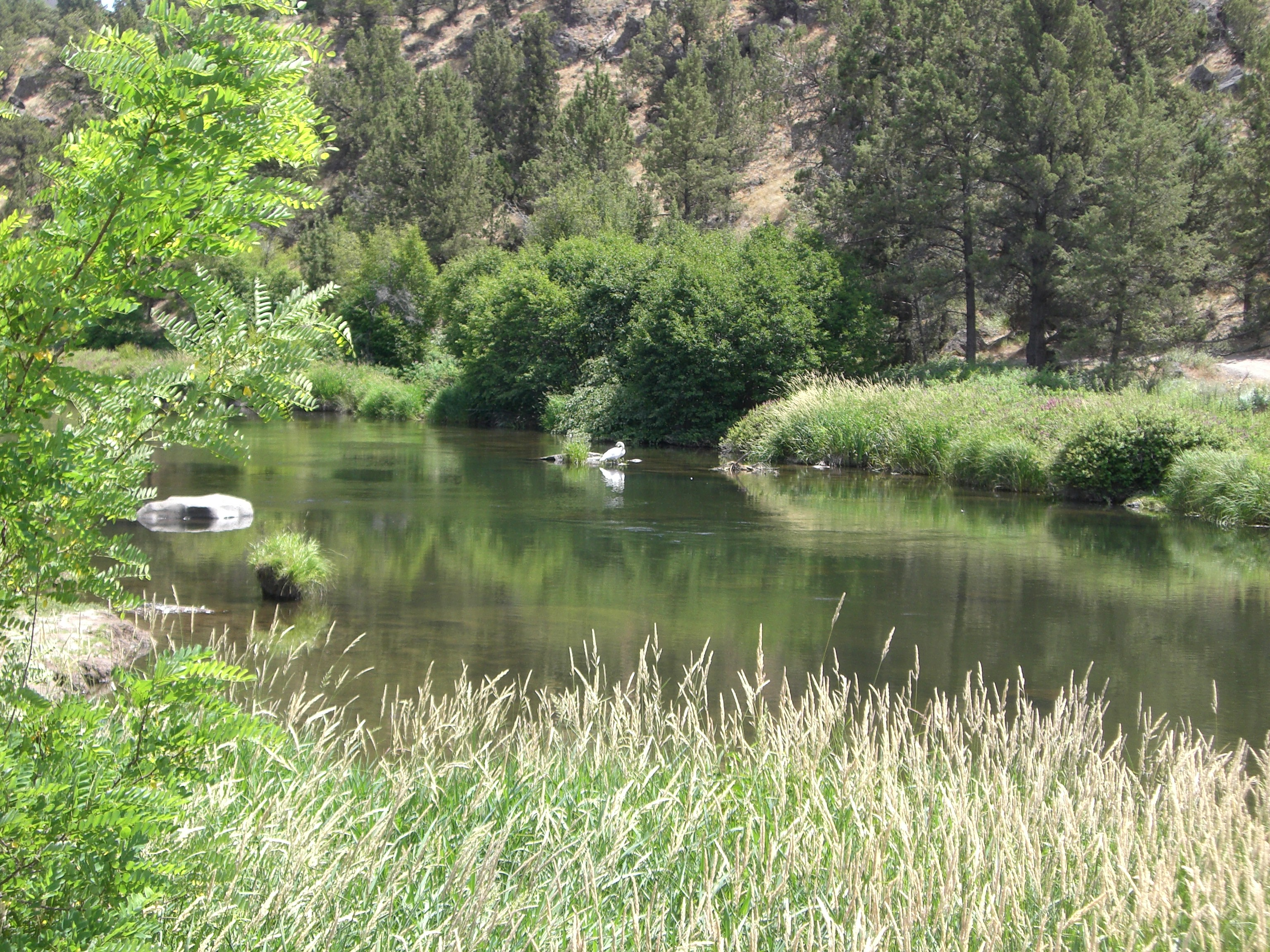
- Deschutes River in Cline Falls State Park
- Date: June 22–23, 1977
- Time: 11:30 p.m.—12:00 a.m.
- Location: Cline Falls State Park, Deschutes County, Oregon, U.S.; 44°16′07″N 121°15′21″W
- Type: Attempted homicide
- Injuries: Terri Lee Jentz; Avra Goldman
- Suspects: Richard Damm; Richard Wayne Godwin

The Cline Falls axe attack refers to an unsolved attempted homicide that occurred on the evening of June 22, 1977, at the Cline Falls State Park in Deschutes County, Oregon United States. The victims were two female college students, Terri Jentz and her roommate, Avra Goldman, who were on a cross-country cycling ride along the Trans America Trail.

Both women decided to spend the night along the Deschutes River at the park near Redmond. During the night, they were awoken by a vehicle that drove over their tent, injuring both. The driver of the vehicle exited his car and proceeded to attack both women with an axe. Both women survived the attack, suffering significant injuries, but their attacker has never been positively identified.

== Timeline ==
=== Background ===
In the summer of 1977, 19-year-old Terri Jentz of Western Springs, Illinois, and her roommate, 20-year-old Avra Goldman of Wellesley, Massachusetts, (Note: In her book Strange Piece of Paradise, Jentz uses the pseudonym "Shayna Weiss," though contemporaneous newspaper reports identify her as Avra Goldman of Wellesley, Massachusetts.) were both Yale University students who decided to cycle across the United States via the newly-opened Trans America Trail. Shortly after beginning their tour, which started in Astoria, Oregon, the women headed east through the state. On the night of June 22, they stopped at the Cline Falls State Park in rural Deschutes County and decided to camp there overnight along the river.

Jentz would later recall being unnerved by the location and that both women felt as though they were being watched: "It was an animal instinct of danger, and we both had it, we both had it separately, and we shared it with one another."

=== Attack ===
Around 11:30 p.m., while both women were asleep in their tent, they were awoken by the sound of a truck pulling up to their campsite. Jentz initially believed the vehicle was driven by partying teenagers who had driven up to the campsite. The vehicle then proceeded to drive over the tent before stopping, its tires pinning Jentz to the ground at her chest, breaking both of her arms, one leg, her collarbone, and several ribs, as well as crushing her lung. A man exited the vehicle carrying an axe and struck Goldman in the head with it around six times. After, the man stood over Jentz. She recalled:

I looked up at him and opened my eyes and I said, 'Take anything but leave us alone, please leave us alone.' He brought the ax down slowly, and I caught it in my hands right above my heart, grabbed the blade in my hands... and then he withdrew it.

After Jentz begged the man, he returned to his vehicle and drove away. Though severely injured, Jentz managed to stumble to a nearby road, where she flagged down Bill Penhollow and Darlene Gervais, (Note: Contemporary reports identify Darlene Gervais as "Boo Issack", though contemporaneous newspaper reports use the former name.) two teenagers who were passing by. Gervais recalled that Jentz was "so bloody it was dripping off her hair... the ends of her hair." Penhollow and Gervais drove to the campsite to tend to Goldman, who was severely injured, and while doing so, noticed a pair of headlights appear in the distance at the edge of the park, which frightened them as they assumed it to be the attacker returning to the scene. The vehicle, however, drove away.

=== Investigation ===
==== Initial response ====
Police arrived at the Cline Falls campsite after midnight on June 23 and began investigating the scene. Police officers who inspected the scene examined tire marks left in the dirt; they determined the vehicle likely had two bald tires in the rear, which were 6 inches (150 mm) in width; one of the front tires was possibly bald, while the other had significant tread. Both Jentz and Goldman were taken to St. Charles Medical Center in Bend, where Goldman underwent a nine-hour emergency brain operation.

==== Interviews and suspects ====
Detectives were unable to obtain a rounded description of the attacker from the victims; Goldman, who had sustained severe brain trauma, remembered nothing of the attack. Jentz, who was conscious throughout, did not see the face of the assailant but described him as a physically fit, "young cowboy" based on his clothing and stature.

In the weeks following the attack, a local woman in Redmond told authorities that she had been told that the attacker was a local young man named Richard "Dick" Damm (born November 10, 1959), then 17 years old. (Note: Jentz uses the name Dirk Duran in her book, Strange Piece of Paradise, which she states is a pseudonym. though an ABC News report refers to him as "Dick Damm.") Detectives interviewed Damm on several occasions and discovered he had been in a fight with his girlfriend, Janey Fraley, around the date of the attack. However, he never disclosed his specific whereabouts on the night of June 22. Fraley denied that the two fought on that day, though she stated the two did fight often. After a polygraph examination taken by Damm proved inconclusive, he was given a second polygraph on July 14, 1977. The results of the second polygraph were shown to be "deceptive". However, the validity of these results was called into question when it was discovered Damm was under the influence of methamphetamine during the examination. The results of both polygraph examinations were subsequently analyzed by laboratories in Salem, the state capital and it was the opinion of the analysts that Damm showed deception in both.

Fraley later told authorities that she had noticed Damm changed the tires on his truck shortly after the attack and that a toolbox in the truck bed had been removed. She also conceded to police that Damm had been abusive to her throughout their relationship.

Another suspect in the attack was convicted child rapist and murderer Richard Wayne "Bud" Godwin. After the attack, Godwin was imprisoned for the murder of a five-year-old child, whose skull he used as a candle holder. On the night of Jentz and Goldman's attack, a female relative of Godwin's–with whom he had allegedly had a sexual relationship–was possibly staying at the Cline Falls park. Despite law enforcement's considering Godwin as a suspect, Jentz stated that he did not resemble the man she recalled attacking her.

=== Later developments ===
Both Jentz and Goldman survived their attack and recovered from their injuries, though Goldman was left with vision problems resulting from her head trauma. In September 1977, Goldman's parents donated $3,000 to St. Charles Medical Center into a fund for critical-care monitoring equipment under the names of Penhollow and Gervais, the two teenagers who found Jentz and Goldman and helped save them.

In 2006, Jentz published a book recounting her life after the attack, titled Strange Piece of Paradise. While researching in preparation for the book, she discovered that the official records of the attack, including interviews, physical evidence, and crime scene photos, had been inadvertently lost.

=== See also ===
Ghosts of Highway 20 - Details on other rapes, homicides, and attempted murders along the same route, during a similar time frame.

== Works cited ==
- Jentz, Terri (2006). Strange Piece of Paradise. New York: Macmillan. ISBN 978-0-312-42669-9.
