= Haematosiphon inodorus =

Scientific classification
- Kingdom: Animalia
- Phylum: Arthropoda
- Clade: Pancrustacea
- Class: Insecta
- Order: Hemiptera
- Suborder: Heteroptera
- Family: Cimicidae
- Genus: Haematosiphon
- Species: H. inodorus

Binomial name
- Haematosiphon inodorus (Dugès, 1892)

Species of parasitic insect

Haematosiphon inodorus is a species of blood-sucking obligate ectoparasitic insect from the family Cimicidae, commonly called Mexican chicken bug, chicken bug or poultry bug. After feeding they remain in or near their host's roost, nest, substrate, or dwelling, but not on the body.

== Hosts ==
The range of hosts of H. inodorus has expanded. The insect has been found in the golden eagle (Aquila chrysaetos) nests in Southern Idaho.

H. inodorus has also appeared in the nests of Falconiformes and Strigiformes as well as domestic fowl or Gallinaceous birds. On the list of hosts are the California condor (Gymnogyps californianus), Turkey vulture (Cathartes aura), golden eagle (Aquila chrysaetos), red-tailed hawk (Buteo jamaicensis), Prairie falcon (Falco mexicanus), great horned owl (Bubo virginianus), barn owl (Tyto alba), domestic chicken (Gallus gallus), domestic turkey (Meleagris gallopavo), and bald eagle (Haliaeetus leucocephalus).

== Human interaction ==
If an infected host builds a nest on a house, or even a barn, and the host leaves or the nest is disturbed, H. inodorus might travel looking for blood food and hitch a ride on a human.

The CDC states that H. inodorus "is not an effective vector of disease", and has stated "Bed bugs should not be considered as a medical or public health hazard. Bed bugs are not known to spread disease." Bed bugs, a problem worldwide, are resurging, causing property loss, expense, and inconvenience, but they do not transmit disease.

Chicken bugs have been found infected with blood-borne pathogens, but they do not appear to be effective vectors of disease. The main clinical importance is inflammation from arthropod bites and stings due to components in their saliva. Varied allergic reactions can occur including anaphylaxis.
