= Cass A. Cline =

American pioneer

- Central Oregon pioneer C. A. Cline
- Born: August 28, 1850; Porter County, Indiana
- Died: July 19, 1926 (aged 75); Prineville, Oregon
- Occupation: Dentist
- Known for: Namesake landmarks

Cass Adelbert Cline (also known as C. A. Cline; August 28, 1850 – July 19, 1926) was an American pioneer who was an early settler in central Oregon. Cline's family moved to Oregon when he was a small child, settling west of the Cascade Mountains near Roseburg. As a young man, Cline moved to central Oregon and claimed homestead land along the Deschutes River. He later became a well-known dentist, property developer, and race horse breeder. Today, a waterfall on the Deschutes River, a nearby mountain group, and a state park bear his name.

== Early life ==
Cline was born on August 28, 1850, in Porter County, Indiana. His parents were John Michael Cline and Nancy (Trim) Cline. In 1853, his family left Indiana for the Oregon Territory, settling near the town of Roseburg.

In 1871, Cline moved to central Oregon, but later returned to the Willamette Valley. Cline married Nellie Aldrich in 1877. This first marriage ended sometime before 1885. Cline married his second wife, Emily Marchbanks, on November 20, 1885, in Salem, Oregon. At the time of their marriage, he was 35 years old and she was 17. Together, Cline and his second wife had three children, two daughters and a son.

== Central Oregon pioneer ==
In 1886, Cline moved back to central Oregon. He filed a homestead claim on land along the west bank of the Deschutes River, adjacent to a 20-foot (6.1 m) waterfall that now bears his name. In 1891, Cline opened a dental office in Prineville, Oregon. He specialized in crown and bridge work as well as performing tooth extractions. He later moved his dental practice to Redmond. Cline practiced dentistry in central Oregon for over 40 years.

In addition to his dental practice, Cline was active in the land development business. In 1892, he founded the Falls Irrigation Company to help develop the area along the Deschutes River. Over the years, he also acquired and sold large tracts of land in central Oregon.

Cline was also a successful and well-known race horse breeder. His best known horse was Barnato. It was born in 1894. It won nine out of nine local races early in his racing career, becoming very well known throughout Oregon. As a three-year-old, Barnatocopy edit' set a course record at a major race in Oakland, California. In 1900, Barnato won first prize at the eastern Oregon thoroughbred show and then won second place in the thoroughbred exhibition at the Oregon State Fair in Salem. That same year, Barnato also won the premier horse race at the state fair.

== Town of Cline Falls ==
In the early years of the twentieth century, the community of Cline Falls was established on property owned by Cline. The town was located on the west bank of the Deschutes River overlooking a large waterfall. The waterfall and the town were both named after Cline. In 1904, the Cline Falls post office was opened. At its height, the town had two stores, two hotels, a livery stable, a school, a meat market, and a newspaper. The town site also had several homes (including one belonging to Cline) as well as 500 residential lots available for sale. In addition, the town had a power plant that generated electricity by diverting water above the falls to flow through turbines at the bottom of the falls.

The town began to decline in 1911 after the area's first railroad chose a route on the east side of the river running through the neighboring town of Redmond. The Cline Falls post office was closed in 1919. By the 1960s, there was nothing left of the Cline Falls community except the abandoned power plant. The power plant building was finally demolished in 2015 and the plant's dam and diversion canal were removed in 2017.

== Later life and legacy ==
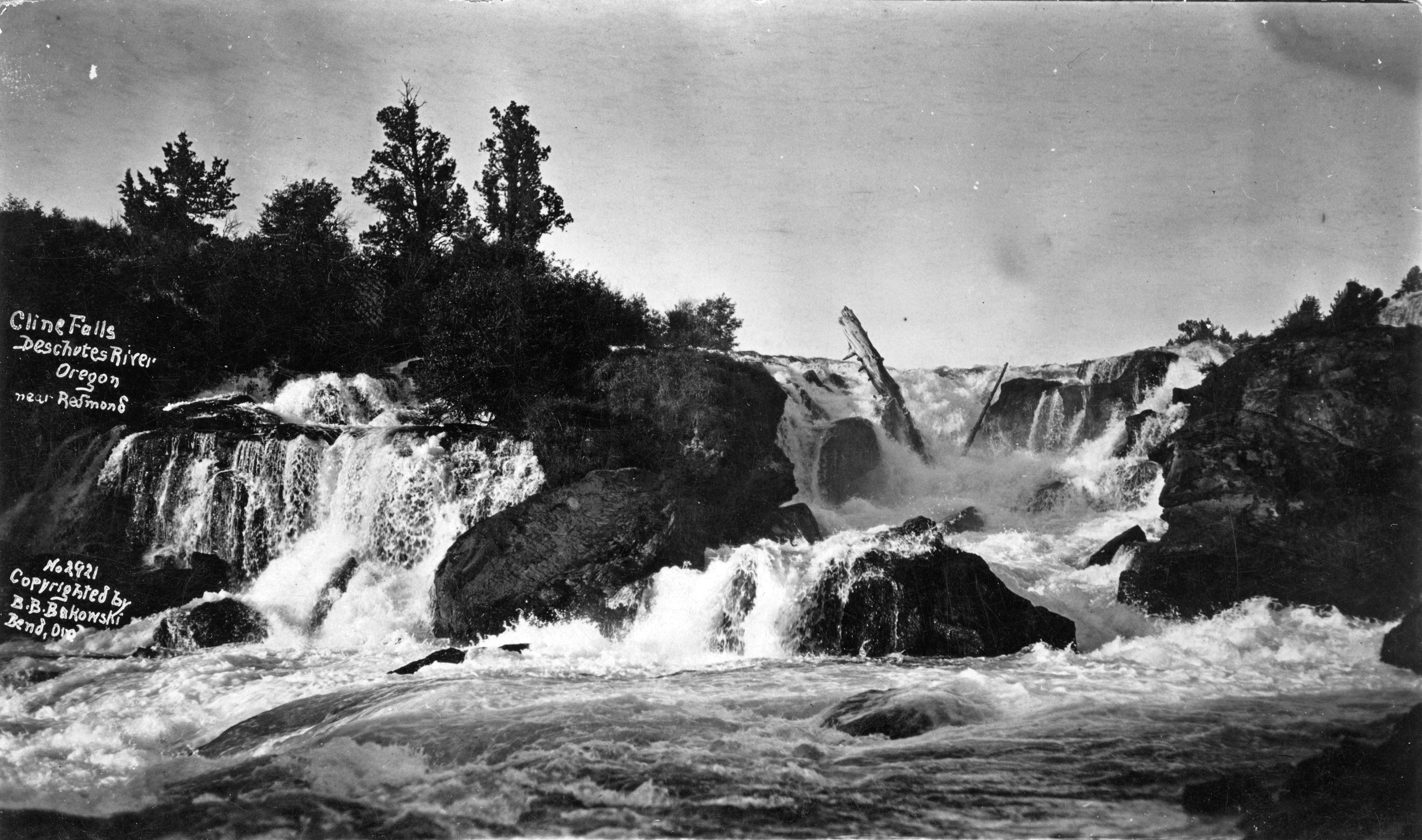
Cline Falls on the Deschutes River

In 1924, Cline was selected for a two-year term as a Deschutes County precinct elections board clerk serving the city of Redmond. In 1926, Cline was re-appointed to the Redmond elections board, this time as board chairman.

Cline died at his daughter's home in Prineville on July 19, 1926. He was buried at Redmond Memorial Cemetery in Redmond. His wife, Emily, died in Redmond in 1942.

While the town of Cline Falls has disappeared, Cline's name is still attached to two important geographic features west of Redmond. Cline Falls is a waterfall on the Deschutes River and nearby is a mountain group known as Cline Buttes. There is also a 9-acre (3.6 ha) state park along the east bank of the Deschutes River just south of the falls called Cline Falls State Scenic Viewpoint. The park is located on property once owned by Cline. Today, the park is administered by the Oregon Parks and Recreation Department.
