= Beverly Beach State Park =

State park in Oregon, United States

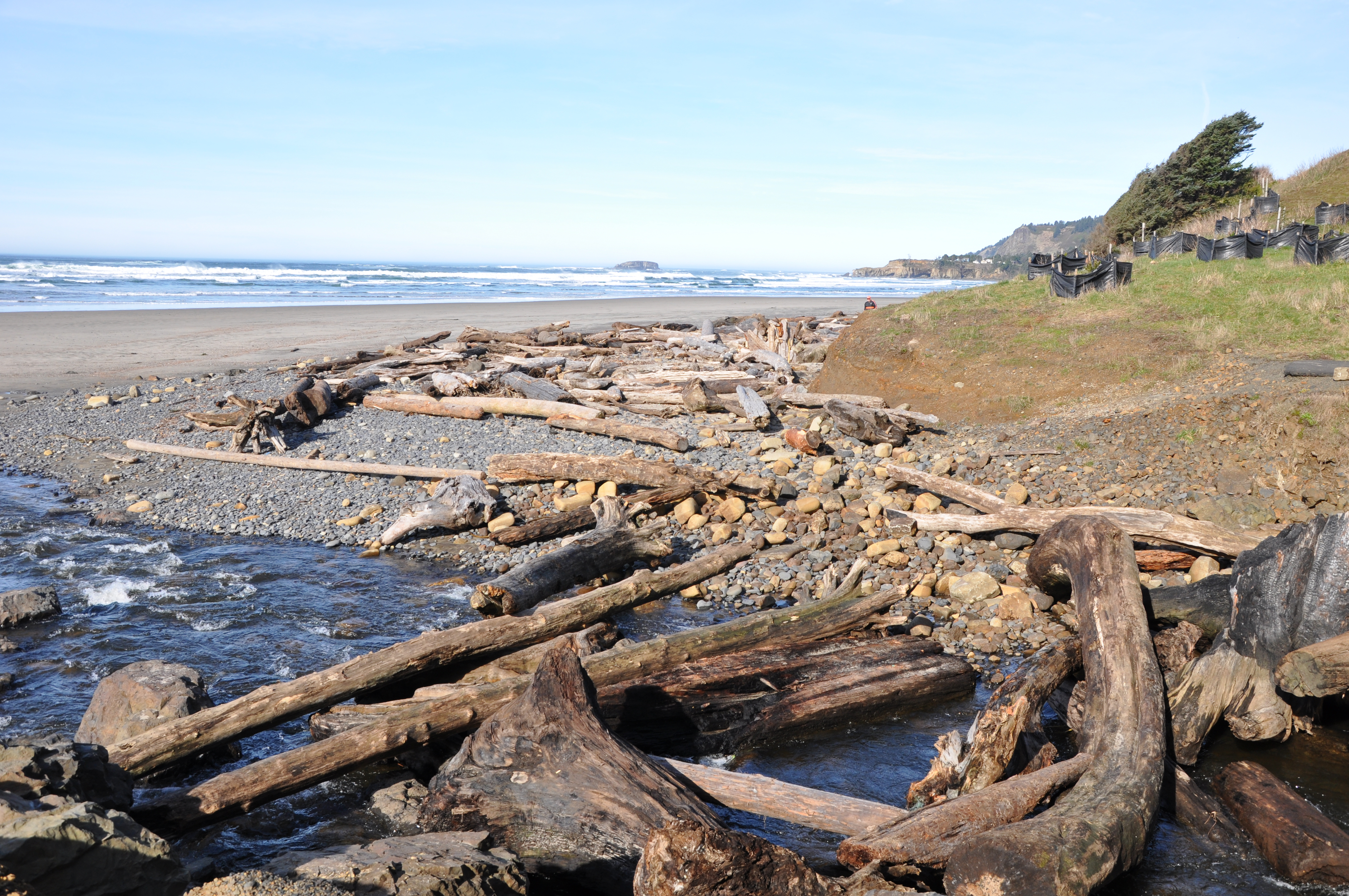
- Driftwood at Beverly Beach

- Location within Oregon Location within the United States
- Interactive map of Beverly Beach State Park
- Type: Public, state
- Location: Lincoln County, Oregon
- Nearest city: Newport
- Coordinates: 44°43′46″N 124°03′27″W
- Operator: Oregon Parks and Recreation Department
- Status: Open

Beverly Beach State Park is a state park in the U.S. state of Oregon located 5 miles (8.0 km) north of Newport. It is a full R.V. hookup camping area with showers, bathrooms, beach access, and a meeting hall where evening interpretive programs take place. The park also has tent areas, as well as yurts for rent. The yurts have a heater, beds, table, a couch, and a porch.
