= Oregon Department of Transportation =

Department of the state government of Oregon, United States

Agency overview
- Formed: 1969
- Preceding agencies: Oregon State Highway Commission; Oregon State Highway Department
- Jurisdiction: Oregon
- Headquarters: 355 Capitol Street NE, Salem, Oregon 97301-3871
- Agency executive: Kris Strickler, Director
- Parent agency: Oregon Transportation Commission
- Website: oregon.gov/odot

The Oregon Department of Transportation (ODOT) is a department of the state government of the U.S. state of Oregon responsible for systems of transportation. It was first established in 1969. It had been preceded by the Oregon State Highway Department which, along with the Oregon State Highway Commission, was created by an act of the Oregon Legislative Assembly in 1913. It works closely with the five-member Oregon Transportation Commission (the modern name of the Highway Commission) in managing the state's transportation systems.

The Oregon Transportation Commission, formerly the Oregon State Highway Commission, is a five-member governor-appointed government agency that manages the state highways and other transportation in the U.S. state of Oregon, in conjunction with the Oregon Department of Transportation.

== History ==
=== Inception ===
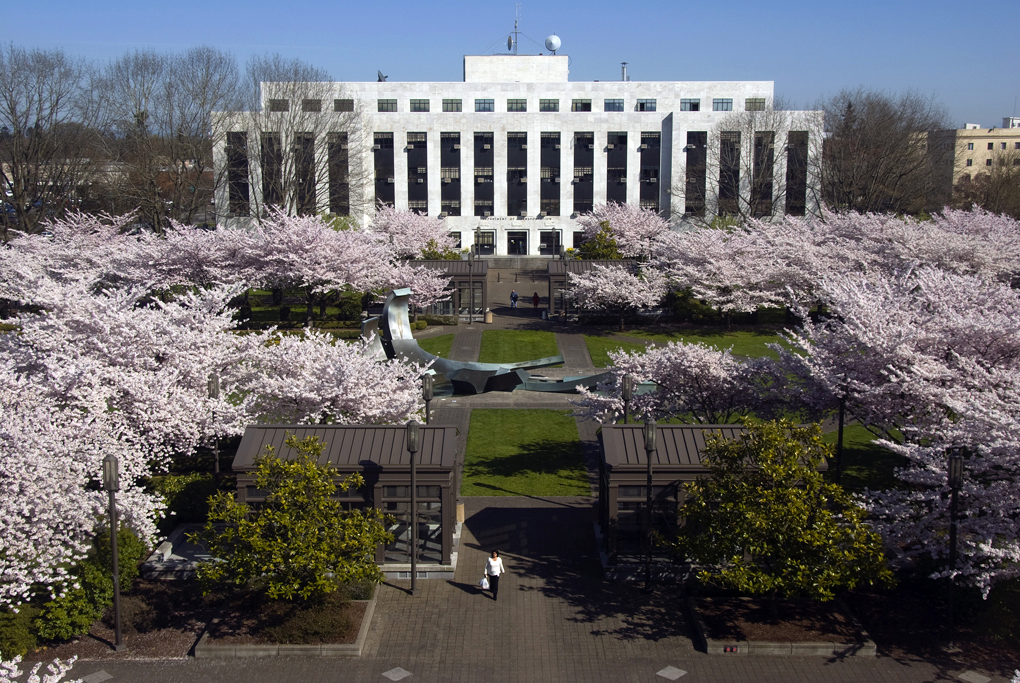
ODOT headquarters in Salem

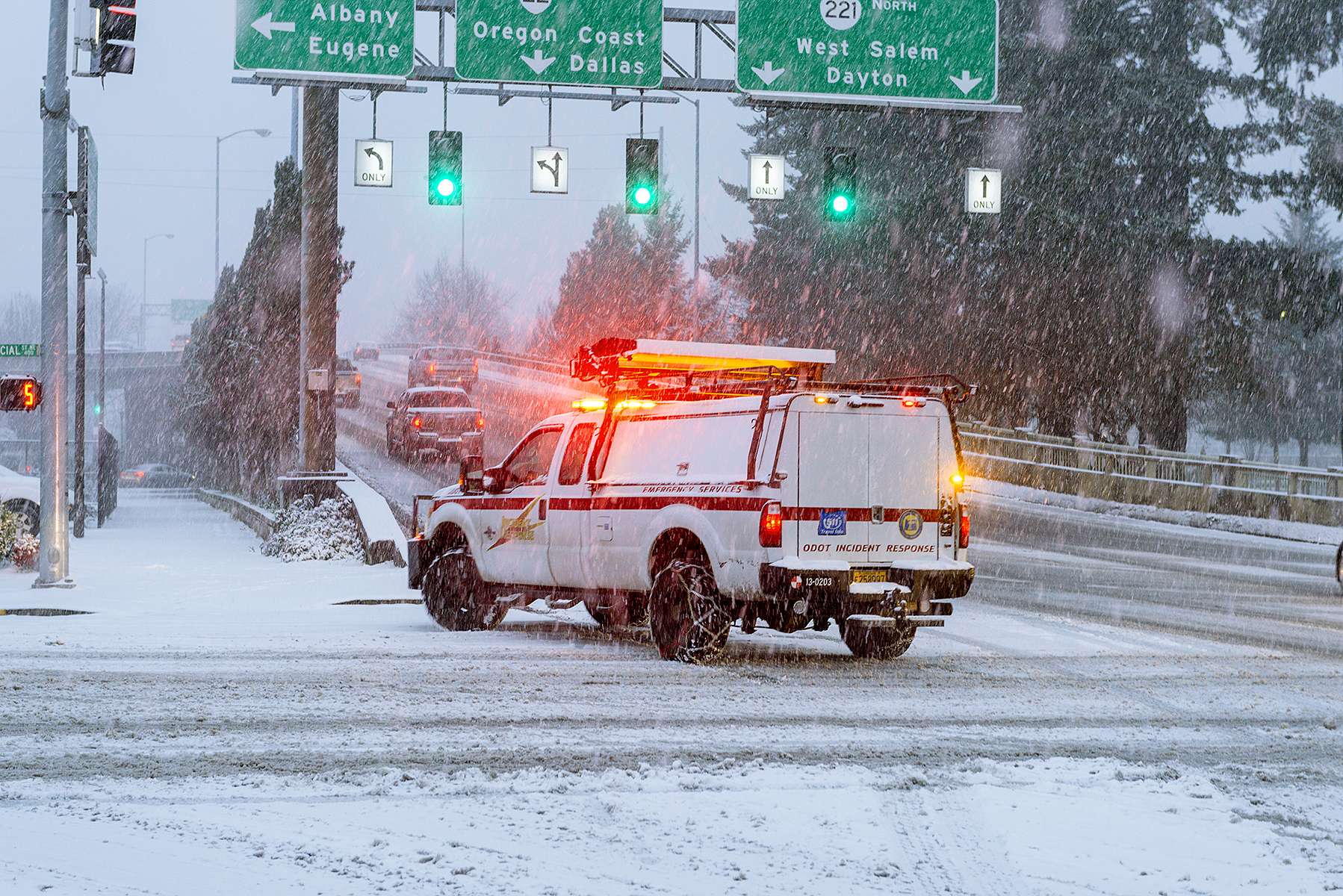
Incident response truck in Salem

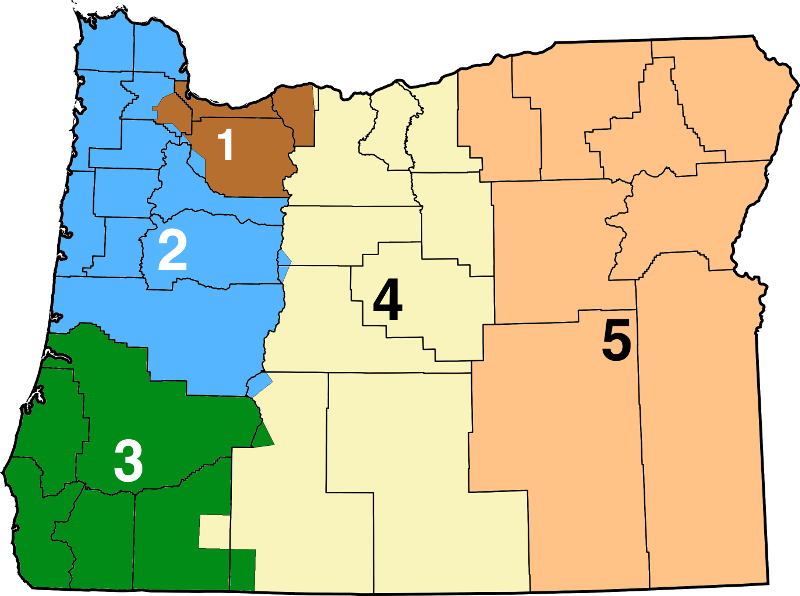
ODOT Highway Division Regions

The first State Highway Commission in Oregon was created on August 12, 1913, and was composed of Governor Oswald West, Secretary of State Ben W. Olcott, and Treasurer Thomas B. Kay. On January 12, 1915, James Withycombe became Governor and replaced Oswald West on the commission. The 1917 Oregon Legislative Assembly redesigned the State Highway Commission, with citizens appointed to replace the elected officials. The new commissioners held their first meeting on March 6, 1915, and the commission was then known as the Oregon Highway Division. As Oregon's transportation needs started to grow, the division expanded and, in 1919, it employed their first State Bridge Engineer, Conde McCullough.

=== Events ===
By 1920, Oregon had 620 miles (998 km) of paved roads and 297.2 miles (478.3 km) of plank roads for a population of 783,389 and, by 1932, the work that had been started on the Oregon Coast Highway (also known as U.S. Route 101) in 1914 was completed, except for five bridges, which meant greater responsibility for the division. This work was complete when the construction of the bridges over the Yaquina, Alsea, Siuslaw, and Umpqua rivers and Coos Bay were completed, closing the last gaps in the highway. By 1940, the highway division was managing more than 7,000 miles (11,300 km) of state, market and country roads in Oregon, with nearly 5,000 miles (8,000 km) being hard-surfaced.

==== Exploding whale incident ====
On November 12, 1970, the department was tasked with disposing of a dead sperm whale that washed ashore on the beach near Florence. The department exploded the dead whale using half a ton of dynamite to blast it off the beach. Pieces of dead whale went everywhere including the beach, bystanders, a parking lot and a park, severely damaging at least one car. Willamette Week reported, "The decision to publicly dynamite an enormous mammal has become one of Oregon's all-time most bizarre moments."

This became known as the "exploding whale incident". In 2018, the city government of Portland, Oregon and ODOT entered into an intergovernmental agreement in which the Portland city government takes over the cleanups of transient camps on ODOT right-of-way in select locations in Portland in exchange for payments from ODOT.

=== Twenty-first Century ===
In 2019, ODOT installed boulders at five locations in Portland to deter transient camps around the freeways. The installations have received support from neighbors while criticized by homeless advocacy groups.

== Operations ==
ODOT oversees a variety of programs across the state. This includes driver and vehicle licensing through the Department of Motor Vehicles (DMV), highway and bridge building and maintenance, public transportation services, and motor carrier functions. Highway maintenance includes trash and graffiti removal, re-paving of roads, ice and snow removal, mowing along highways, repairs, and lighting, among other tasks. The public transportation services including grants to transit districts, passenger rail, and the Safe Routes to School Programs, among others. The operations division for highways is divided into five geographic regions across the state. As of 2026, the biennial budget was $6.1 billion.

== Notable people ==
- John Arthur Ackroyd (1949–2016) was a maintenance worker and suspected serial killer
- Grace Crunican (b. 1955) was director from 1996 to 2001
- William Tebeau (1925–2013) was an engineer who worked for ODOT for 36 years

== See also ==
- Glenn Jackson, an influential twenty-year member of the commission
- Oregon Department of Aviation
- State highways in Oregon
