= Cline Falls =

Waterfall in Oregon, United States

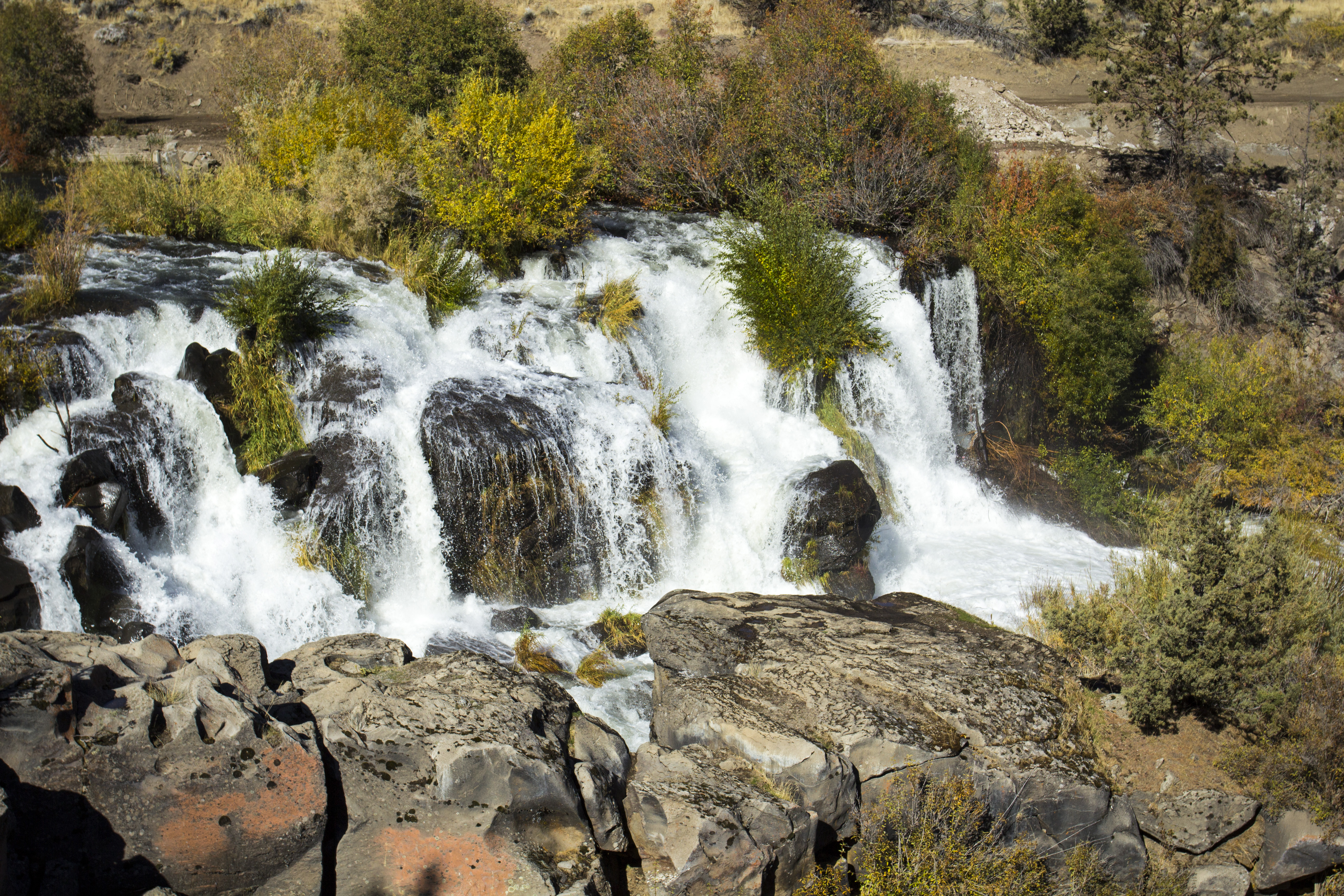
- Cline Falls near Redmond, Oregon

- Location within Oregon
- Location: Near Redmond, Oregon
- Coordinates: 44°16′37″N 121°15′31″W
- Type: Segmented steep cascade
- Elevation: 2,802 ft (854 m)
- Total height: 20 ft (6.1 m)
- Number of drops: 1
- Total width: 50 ft (15 m)
- Run: 50 ft (15 m)
- Watercourse: Deschutes River
- Average flow rate: 200 cu ft/s (5.7 m^{3}/s)

Cline Falls is a 20 ft-high (6.1 m) segmented steep cascade waterfall on the Deschutes River. It is approximately 4 miles (6.4 km) west of Redmond, Oregon, United States. The waterfall is named for Cass A. Cline, who owned the land adjacent to the falls in the early 20th century. The falls occur just north of the point where Oregon Route 126 crosses the Deschutes River. The riparian area around Cline Falls provides habitat for a variety of fish and wildlife species.

== Characteristics ==
Cline Falls is one of the highest waterfalls along the Deschutes River in Central Oregon. It is a steep segmented cascade. The falls drop approximately 20 ft (6.1 m) through several channels carved into the basalt cliff that cuts crosses the riverbed. The falls are approximately 50 ft (15 m) wide with an average flow of 200 cu ft/s (5.7 m^{3}/s). However, the flow over the falls varies throughout the year as a result of irrigation water being taken out of the river above the falls during the summer. The falls have a forward run of about 50 ft (15 m), descending at 77-degree angle through the cataract.

Based on the International Waterfall Classification System, Cline Falls is rated at 2.83, making it a Class-3 waterfall. The International Waterfall Classification System is a logarithmic scale that groups waterfalls into ten classes based on the height and pitch of the waterfall as well as the average volume of water flowing over the falls.

Cline Falls is 4 miles (6.4 km) west of Redmond, Oregon. It is just north of the Deschutes River bridge along Route 126. There is a view point above the falls, just off the Cline Falls Highway, which runs north and south along the west rim of the Deschutes River canyon. On the east side of the river, there is a short hiking trail to the falls from the parking area at Cline Falls State Park.

== History ==
The falls are named in honor of Doctor Cass A. Cline, a pioneer dentist and property developer from Redmond. Cline owned the falls and much of the adjacent property along the west bank of the river. In 1892, he founded the Falls Irrigation Company to help develop the area along the Deschutes. A decade later, Cline established a small town called Cline Falls on the west bank of the river overlooking the waterfall. A community post office was opened in 1904. The town declined after 1911 when the area's first railroad was built on the east side of the river. The town’s post office was closed in 1919.

In the early 20th century, Cline Falls was used for hydroelectric power production. In 1901, Cline sold a site next to the falls to F.T. Hurlburt, president of Condon National Bank. Hurlburt then financed the construction of a power plant to provide electricity for Redmond and nearby Prineville. The power was also used to run pumps that provided irrigation water to local farms and ranches. The power plant was purchased by the Pacific Power and Light Company. Over the years, large amounts of water were diverted from the Deschutes River above the falls for irrigation. This significantly reduced the river's flow at the falls, making steady power production difficult.

By the 1960s, there was nothing left of the Cline Falls community except the abandoned power plant. The power plant building was demolished in 2015, and the plant's dam and diversion canal were removed in 2017. This increased the flow over the natural waterfall course and improved the riparian habitat for creatures in and around the river.

== Environment and ecology ==
The stretch of the Deschutes River around Cline Falls runs through a basalt rimrock canyon with a narrow band of wetlands on either side of the channel. The canyon environment is dominated by western juniper with ponderosa pine in some areas. The most common ground cover plants near the falls are sagebrush and bitterbrush. Sagebrush is found from the canyon rim to the river shoreline. The riparian wetlands along the river bank support willow, alder, locust, and poplar trees. Cattails and sedges are common along the water's edge and extend into the river channel above Cline Falls.

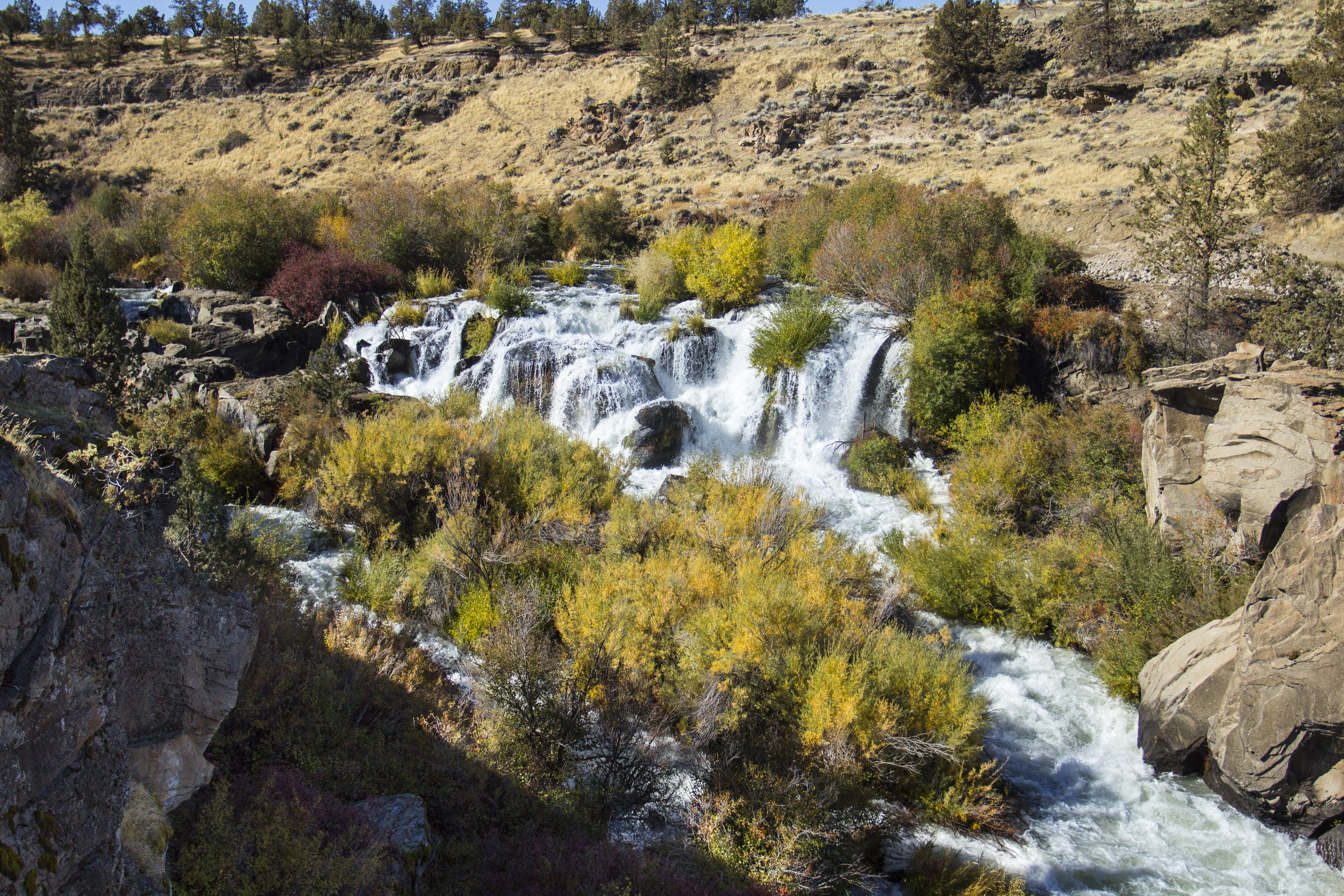
Cline Falls in Deschutes River environment

The riparian area surrounding Cline Falls hosts a variety of wildlife. In the river, there is a variety of game fish including rainbow trout. Near Cline Falls, the rainbow trout average between 6 and 12 inches (15 and 30 cm) long; however, some can reach 18 inches (46 cm). While rainbow trout are the most common game fish, brown trout and whitefish are also found in the river around the falls. Some of the brown trout can reach 20 inches (50 cm) and weigh as much as 8 pounds (3.6 kg); crayfish are also common in the river around Cline Falls.

The fish feed on a wide variety of insects especially in the spring and summer, when large hatchings occur along the Deschutes River including the area around Cline Falls. Mayflies begin hatching in March. Baetis and pale morning dun mayflies hatch throughout the season along with caddisflies. Salmonflies also hatch in some areas along the river.

The Cline Falls riparian area also hosts both songbirds and raptors. In addition, California quail are found in the canyon around the falls. Birds common to the area include Brewer's blackbirds, mountain chickadee, American goldfinch, lesser goldfinch, black-headed grosbeak, mountain bluebird, Steller's jay, northern flickers, and black-billed magpie. Birds of prey found in the area include golden eagles and red-tailed hawks. During migration seasons, Canada geese rest in the calm waters and wetland above the falls.

Larger mammals found in the area around Cline Falls include mule deer and coyotes. Smaller mammals include striped skunks, white-tailed jackrabbits, mountain cottontails, Belding's ground squirrels, golden-mantled ground squirrels, and least chipmunks.

== Recreation ==
In 1956, the Oregon Parks and Recreation Department acquired property above Cline Falls for the purpose of creating a day-use park. It was developed as a recreational fishing area. Cline Falls State Scenic Viewpoint is a 9-acre (3.6 ha) day-use park running along the east bank of the Deschutes River .25 miles (0.40 km) upstream from the waterfall. The park includes prime river frontage with parking, picnic tables, and restrooms. There is a trail that follows the river downstream from the park to the falls.

Between Cline Falls state park and the waterfall is a slow-water swimming hole that is popular during the summer months. However, Cline Falls is a serious hazard for swimmers, kayakers, river rafters, and inner-tube floaters on the river. Several deaths have occurred as a result of people going over the falls. For river travelers to safely pass Cline Falls, they must portage around the waterfall. A portage path is available.

There is a rock climbing site on the canyon wall adjacent to Cline Falls. The climbing wall is a basalt face on the east side of the river. Climbers normally hike to the site along the river path from Cline Falls state park.

== See also ==
- List of waterfalls in Oregon
