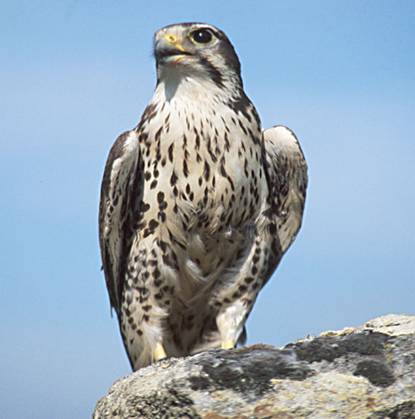

Conservation status
- Least Concern (IUCN 3.1)

Scientific classification
- Kingdom: Animalia
- Phylum: Chordata
- Class: Aves
- Order: Falconiformes
- Family: Falconidae
- Genus: Falco
- Species: F. mexicanus

Binomial name
- Falco mexicanus Schlegel, 1850

Synonyms
- Gennaia mexicana Hierofalco mexicanus

= Prairie falcon =

Species of bird

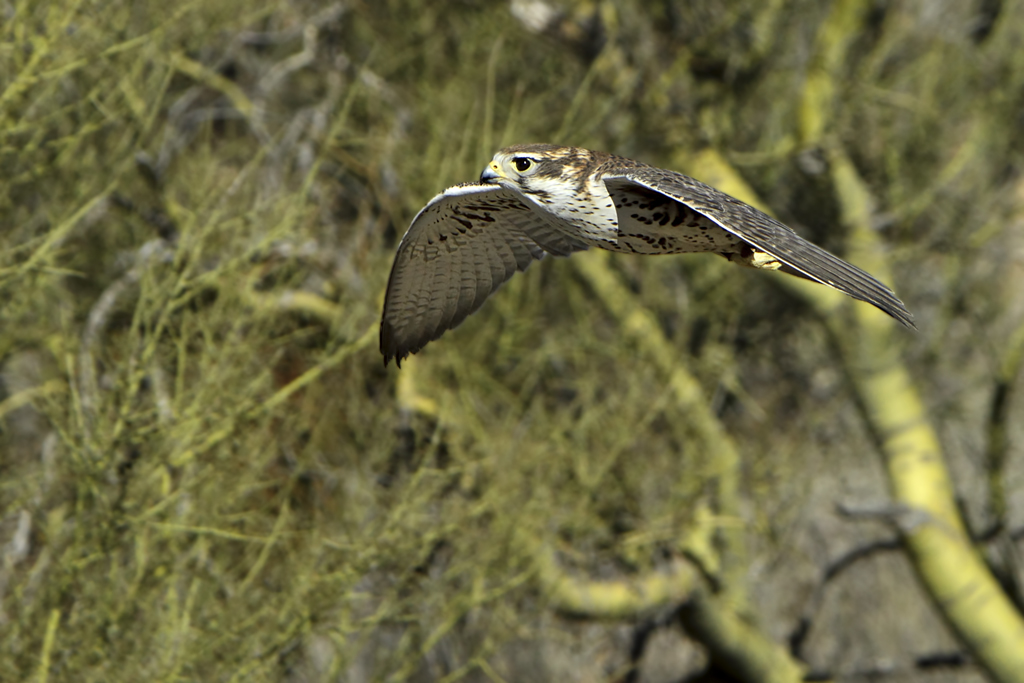
A prairie falcon in Arizona.

The prairie falcon (Falco mexicanus) is a medium-sized falcon found in Western North America. A separate species from the peregrine falcon, with which it shares some visual similarities, the prairie falcon is an arid-climate divergence of earlier peregrine falcon lineage. It is thus able to thrive in dryland ecosystems and is generally lighter in weight than a peregrine of similar wingspan. Having evolved in harsher and desert environments, often with low prey density, the prairie falcon has developed into an aggressive and opportunistic hunter of a wide range of both mammalian and avian prey, as well as occasional reptiles. It will regularly take prey from the size of sparrows or finches to birds approximately its own weight, and occasionally much larger.

The prairie falcon is the only large falcon species native strictly to North America (others are found throughout the Americas and beyond, such as the peregrine falcon with its cosmopolitan distribution). The prairie falcon is resident from Canada (mainly Alberta, British Columbia and Saskatchewan) through the Western United States (west of the Mississippi) and south into Northern Mexico.

Like many raptors and falconiformes, the prairie falcon is popular in falconry; with proper training and care, it is regarded as being equally as skilled as the more well-known peregrine, among others.

== Description ==
=== Appearance ===
==== Adults ====
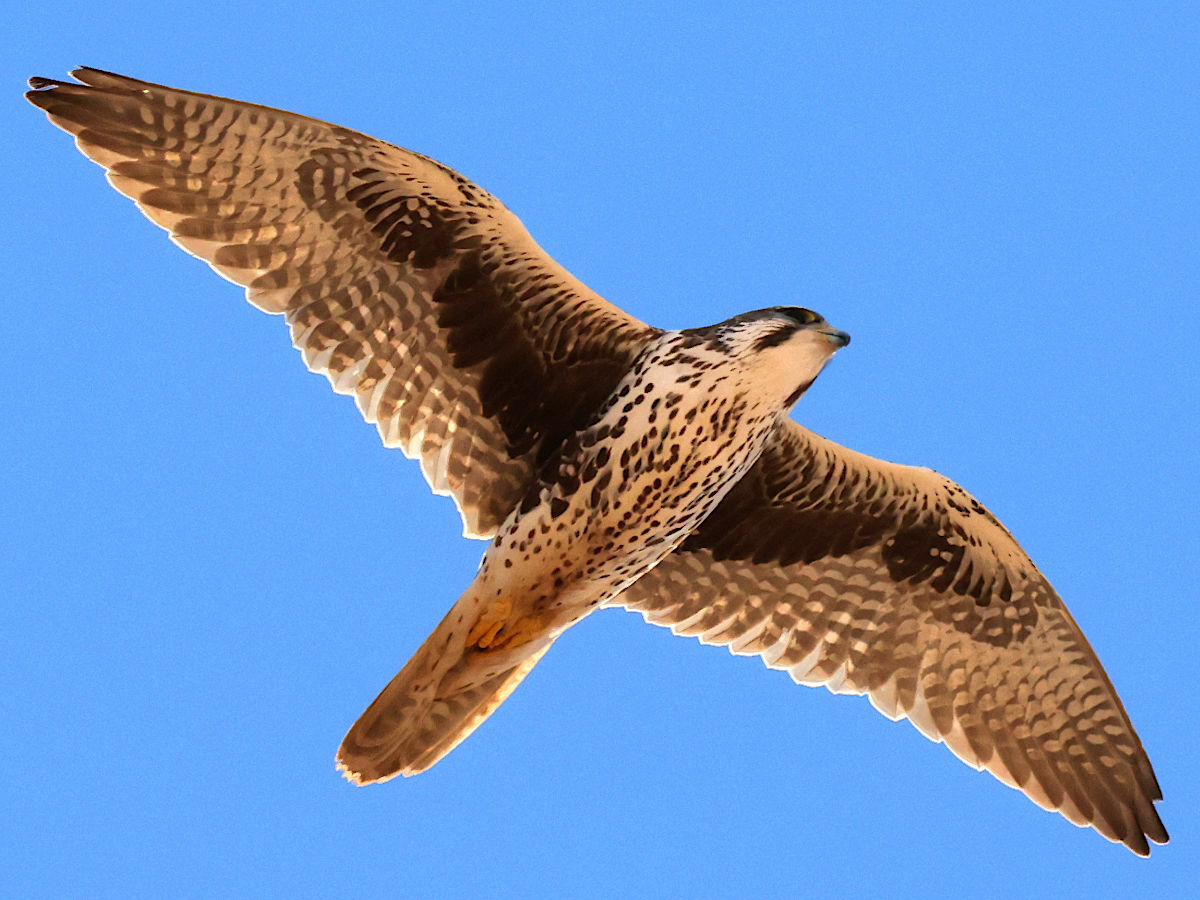
soaring

Male prairie falcons are usually 37 to 38 cm in length (~15 inches) and weigh 500 to 635g (1.1 to 1.4 lbs). Females are about 45 cm in length (17.7 inches) and weigh 762 to 970g (1.7 to 2.1 lbs). A large female can be nearly twice the size of a small male, with wingspan reaching to 1.1 meters (3.5 feet), and tends to hunt significantly larger prey.

Plumage is warm gray-brown (sometimes called "sandy") above and pale with dark mottling below. The head has a thin "moustache" mark, called a malar stripe, that is characteristic of falcons, and a white line over the eye. A conspicuous character is that the axillars ("wingpits") and underwing coverts are very dark brown, except along the leading edge of the wing. This creates an effect of "struts" from the body along each wing.

==== Juveniles ====
There are several ways to distinguish juvenile (first year) Prairie Falcons from adult (second year or older) Prairie Falcons. Each of these methods vary between individuals and several appearance factors may need to be considered as a whole. 1. Vertical dark streaking especially on the upper breast tends to be more prevalent in adults. 2. Exposed portions of shoulder and back feathers tend to be more uniformly colored in juveniles and barred with light and dark horizontal stripes in adults. 3. Skin around eyes, above beak (cere) and on legs and talons tends to be more yellow and sometimes with tinges of orange or green in adults. Skin tends to be gray in juveniles. Factor one can be mistakenly observed because a Prairie Falcon's crop expands and distends upon feeding exposing the white under feathers of the upper breast so that a juvenile Prairie Falcon which just fed can appear from a distance to have a very bright white upper breast like an adult. Also, factor 3 varies so that sometimes a Prairie Falcon's feet begin to turn yellow while juvenile and some individuals have gray skin as adults. It's thought that these fluctuations are caused by diet and resulting hormonal fluctuations between individuals. Interestingly, sometimes one can ascertain whether a Prairie Falcon is exactly in its second year. Some Prairie Falcon individuals molt into adult plumage back and wing feathers that have a more gray tinge than their brown juvenile feathers. First year molts tend to be usually incomplete particularly in the "shoulder" region. If the individual's back and wing feathers have a gray tinge and there are several feathers on the upper wings (shoulder) with a subtle but distinctly different brown tinge, then the bird is a second year bird because it didn't fully molt.

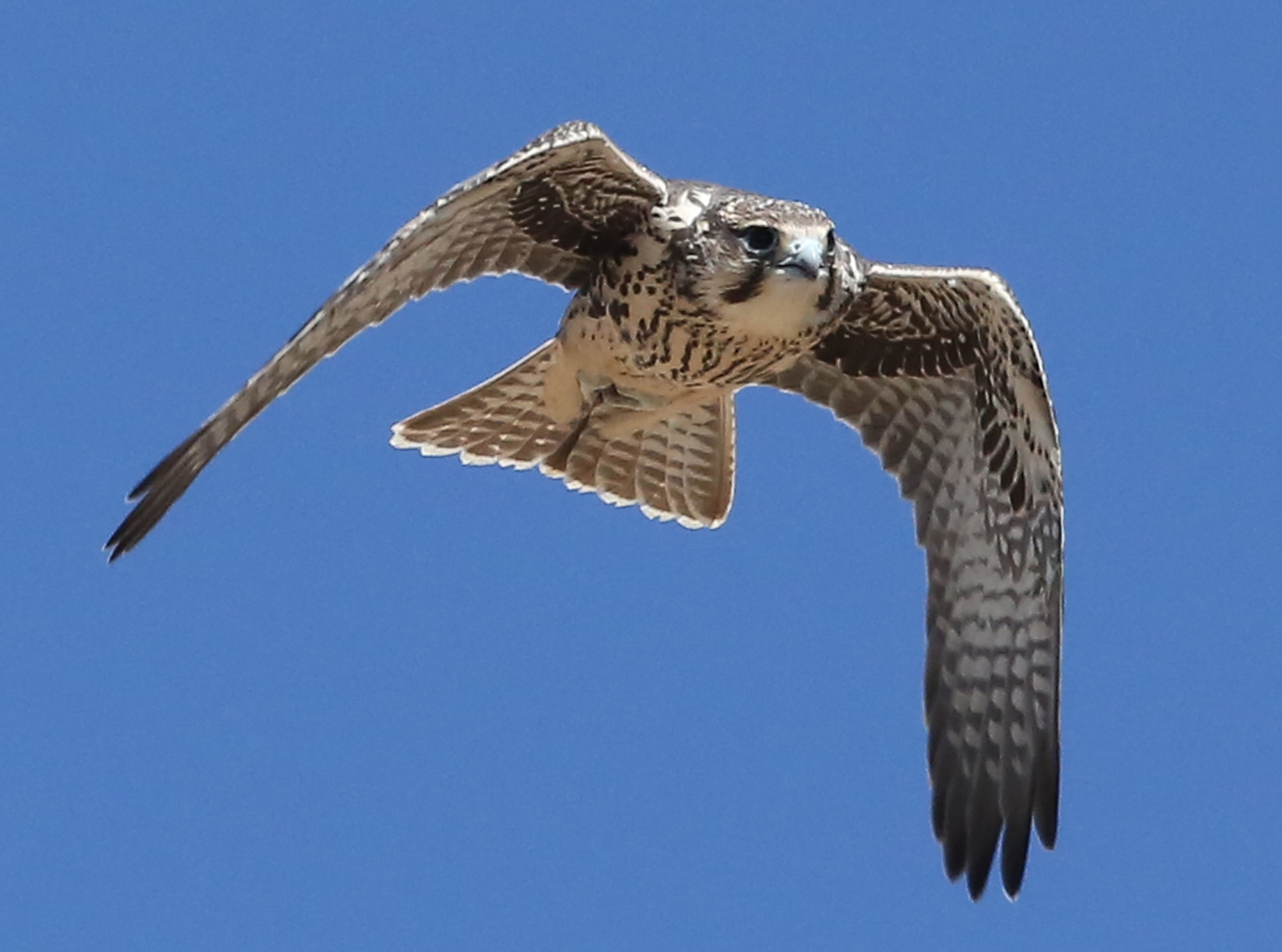
Juvenile Prairie Falcon, Horsetooth Mountain Open Space, Larimer County, Colorado

=== Call ===
Adult calls, heard mostly near the nest, are described as repetitive kree kree kree…, kik kik kik…, and the like, similar to the peregrine's call but higher-pitched.

=== Similar birds ===
Experts can separate a distant prairie falcon from a peregrine falcon (generally the only similar species in its range) by its shape and flight style. The prairie falcon has a longer tail in proportion to its size; a more tubular, less stocky body; and the wing joint is farther from the body. Its wingbeats are described as strong and shallow like the peregrine's and having the same quick cadence, but stiffer and more mechanical.

== Systematics and evolution ==
=== Outward resemblance ===
The prairie falcon outwardly resembles the peregrine as well as the Old World "hierofalcons", especially the saker falcon.

=== Previous categorisation ===
It was previously often considered the only New World member of the hierofalcon subgenus, but in recent decades this assumption has been disproven by genetic analysis. DNA studies beginning in the 1980s have shown the prairie falcon to be closer to the peregrine than to the hierofalcons.

=== Current classification and convergent evolution ===
It now is considered an early aridland offshoot of the peregrine falcon lineage, much as the hierofalcons represent a later separate divergence that similarly adapted to arid habitat. Thus, the similarities between the prairie falcon and the hierofalcons are a good example of convergent evolution, with the prairie falcon and similar looking and behaving Old World forms such as the saker and lanner falcons not being the closest of related species, but instead ecological equivalents. However, "closely related" is a relative term here, since most or all the members of the genus falco are closely enough related that they can produce hybrid offspring via artificial insemination. But, only the most closely related of these species will produce fertile or partially fertile offspring.

=== Relationship to Peregrine falcon ===
The karyological data of Schmutz and Oliphant provided early scientific evidence of the unexpectedly close relationship between the peregrine and prairie falcons. Wink and Sauer-Gürth later estimated using molecular systematics that the prairie falcon diverged about 3 to 5 million years ago from an archaic peregrine ancestor, assuming a molecular clock calibration of 2% sequence divergence per 1 million years. The prairie falcon then evolved from its peregrine stock forebears in a process of parapatric speciation based on partially separated environments where different selective pressures lead to separate genetic drift and eventually to separate species. This process has led to the prairie falcon having enhanced survivability in the sparse arid environment that dominates the interior of the American west. This enhanced competitiveness in this environment is based on superior energy efficiency (being no larger than the prey base and competition with other raptors requires), and versatility in the utilization of a wider range of prey. Moderately lower weight than the muscular peregrine for similar wingspan not only allows lower food and energy requirements by the simple expedient of less muscle to support, but also allows a lighter wing loading (weight per square unit of wing area) that allows more distance to be covered per calorie consumed when hunting over prey sparse terrain. The lighter wing loading also allows greater maneuverability, which is valuable in the pursuit of agile lightly wing loaded prey and rapidly dodging ground prey. When the prairie falcon locates needed prey, it is relentless in its pursuit. Quoting from the book The Prairie Falcon, "Because they evolved in the harsh western environment, prairie falcons have the stamina to out-fly the strongest quarry. They have the spirit to crash through dense cover when attacking prey, something peregrines seldom attempt." In the longer distance lower prey density American west, the prairie falcon also has evolved eyes that are proportionally larger relative to head size than the already large eyes of other falcons. The specialization of the prairie falcon to this particular environment is also reflected by the fact that there are no subspecies of the prairie falcon evolved to fit other environments, and that it seldom strays far outside the native range to which it is most suited and within which it has competitive advantages over the peregrine falcon.

Though they are separate species after several million years of mostly separate evolution, prairie falcons are known to still occasionally interbreed with peregrines in the wild. The male offspring of these crossings may be fertile, and provide an avenue for at least some gene flow to possibly still occur between the species. Such gene flow in the past may have contributed to the continuing genetic closeness of the two species today.

== Ecology, behavior, and reproduction ==
=== Habitat and distribution ===
The natural habitat of the prairie falcon is open country, especially arid, in summer including alpine tundra to shortgrass prairie and high desert. In winter it is more widespread, ranging to low deserts and occasionally to towns. It breeds from southern Saskatchewan, Alberta and south-central British Columbia south through the western United States–roughly between the eastern edge of the Mountain Time Zone and the Cascade Mountains, as well as the Central Valley of California–to the Mexican states of Baja California, Durango, and northern San Luis Potosí. It is much less migratory than the other North American falcons, but in winter it does withdraw somewhat from the northernmost and highest-elevation parts of its breeding range and spreads west to the deserts and Pacific coast of California, east to about the 100th meridian, and south to Baja California Sur, Jalisco, and Hidalgo.

=== Diet ===
The prairie falcon eats mostly small mammals (especially in summer) and small to medium-sized birds caught in flight, though as an opportunistic predator it will occasionally take larger birds. Though accounts of the prairie falcon taking prey as large as geese are verifiable (a prey that may be over 5 times heavier than a large female prairie falcon), it usually takes prey smaller than itself that it may safely subdue and which can be carried to the nest or to a safe perch to consume. The majority of prey is 150g or less, a weight that even the smaller tiercel (male) can carry long distances back to the nest. Most prey is thus 30% or less of the weight of the tiercel, which is a common prey size fraction across numerous species of falcons where the males do the majority of the hunting during the nesting season. However, over shorter distances wildlife biologists have documented prairie falcons carrying up to about 60–70% of their body weight. Common mammalian prey for prairie falcons includes ground squirrels, prairie dogs, voles, chipmunks, gophers, and rabbits of various species. Bird prey commonly includes horned larks, meadow larks, sparrows, starlings, grackles, doves, quail, pigeons, coots, teal, and mallards—virtually any bird of up to approximately the falcon's own size and occasionally significantly larger. Reptiles are also sometimes taken. However, the need to feed their young focuses them on prey they can carry during nesting season, and the reproductive success of the prairie falcon depends upon such smaller prey being available.

=== Flying methods ===
In keeping with the needs of a predator living in a prey-sparse desert environment, the prairie falcon has developed a wide range of hunting and flight styles. Like the merlin, it often hunts by flying fast and low, at a height of only a few meters or so, hoping to find surprised prey as it comes over the terrain or around bushes. Its cruising speed is estimated at 72 km/h (45 mph) and it accelerates in the chase. A variation on this method is for the falcon to stoop down from altitude and then level out near the ground, initially traveling at more than 100 mph at altitudes of a meter or two, sometimes gliding for more than a kilometer this way. If the rapidly approaching falcon flushes bird prey, the falcon has the speed advantage and may rapidly close with the prey. Another variation on these low attacks is using terrain as cover to approach beneath a flock of birds, then using its speed to perform a rapid climbing surprise attack into the flock. It also pursues prey sighted from a perch in the manner of the short-winged accipiter hawks, again often flying low and using its speed to close with the prey in a tail-chase. Prairie falcons may even deliberately emulate the flight style of other birds in order to deceive potential prey and allow a surprise attack by the falcon. The dramatic high speed diving stoop from high altitude in the manner of the peregrine falcon, allowing overtaking the swiftest of birds or delivering a knock-out blow to large prey, is also a very natural part of the hunting repertoire of the prairie falcon. At impact the prey is hit with a closed foot or feet, or swiped with an open foot armed with talons. High-speed films have shown that this second method is the more common, with the toes closed into a "fist" immediately after striking. The claw on the hind toe, or hallux, is particularly effective and deadly in raking the prey. When the closed foot strike is used it is typically directed against the head or wing of the prey, and if it does not outright kill, the prey is often rendered unconscious or unable to fly. These strikes are often accompanied by an explosion of feathers and an audible impact that may be heard from the ground hundreds of feet away. They have been known to be so forceful they can literally separate the head from the body of the prey.

=== Territory ===
Territories of mated pairs in nesting season range from under 30 square kilometers to over 400 square kilometers. Smaller territories where prey does not have to be carried as far may enhance reproductive success.

=== Nesting ===
==== Nest ====
Prairie Falcons nests on cliff ledges. Their nests are alternatively called scrapes or Eyries. They do not build their own nests, but instead take over an unoccupied nest built by red-tailed hawks, golden eagles, ferruginous hawks, or ravens or nest in alcoves directly on the rock face.

==== Eggs ====
The clutch averages five eggs, which are subelliptical and pinkish with brown, reddish-brown, and purplish dots. As part of their adaptation to hotter and lower humidity desert climates, the eggs of the prairie falcon are less porous and retain water better than those of their peregrine falcon cousins, leading to a higher hatching rate under these conditions.

==== Incubation ====
The incubation period is 29-39 days, beginning with the 2nd to last or last egg laid. Females do the bulk of the incubation but males assist with incubation up to ~30% of the time.

==== Splitting of work ====
As is typical for falcons, the female does most of the incubating and brooding, and the male brings most of the food, with the female also hunting after the young are 12 to 14 days old.

==== Chicks ====
The young fledge (first fly) from 36 to 41 days after hatching. They continue to be supported by their parents while learning to fly and hunt, with the parents gradually winding down the amount of food they provide as the youngsters' hunting skills improve. At approximately 65 days of age they are ready to be self-sufficient, and disperse from their natal area.

=== Competition ===
In its range, the prairie falcon must compete for food and space with other often larger raptors including the peregrine falcon, red-tailed hawk, Harris's hawk, ferruginous hawk, great horned owl, and golden eagle. The large, powerful, and surprisingly agile golden eagle is the apex avian predator in this range, and is generally willing and able to attack and kill any of these other raptors. Under the right circumstances all these species are capable of sometimes displacing and occasionally killing the prairie falcon. However, the prairie falcon will aggressively defend its territory against any of them, with male and female often mounting a coordinated attack, and often turns the tables on these larger raptors. Wildlife biologists report numerous observations of prairie falcons successfully driving away and sometimes killing raptors larger than themselves. When a prairie falcon kills a larger raptor, it usually does so in a diving stoop with striking methods similar to what it uses against prey much larger than itself. It may use a foot with talons clinched like a fist to make a high energy strike against the head or wing of its opponent, or use an extended talon in a rapier like thrust to create a fatal wound. However, it is not a given that prairie falcons will always be in conflict with nearby raptors. In years when food is plentiful, prairie falcons have been known to nest within a few hundred meters of great horned owls, peregrine falcons, red-tailed hawks, and golden eagles, with both sets of parents successfully rearing their young.

=== Population size ===
As of 2006, the population of prairie falcons was estimated to be stable or increasing, with perhaps 200 pairs breeding at the Snake River Birds of Prey National Conservation Area in Idaho. It is thought the prairie falcon mostly avoided the population loss suffered by the peregrine from DDT induced egg shell thinning due to its more remote environment partly insulating it from pesticide contamination. The loss of peregrine population allowed the expansion of prairie falcon range to cliff nesting sites in areas formerly occupied by peregrines moderately outside historic prairie falcon territory. The successful reintroduction of peregrines to eastern and central United States brought peregrine and prairie falcons back into competition in these areas. The reintroduction program led by the Peregrine Fund bred and released more than 4,000 peregrine falcons from 1974 to 1997. The program necessarily made use of available captive bred peregrine stock with a strong genetic influence from larger bodied peregrine subspecies. The created strain of mixed subspecies peregrine tends to be heavier and stronger than the prairie falcon, and where they conflict over nesting sites they often displace prairie falcons. However, these reintroduced peregrines are little threat to prairie falcon populations within their natural range, as the prairie falcon with its greater heat tolerance, lower daily food requirement, and wider prey base has the survival advantage in the harsh high desert environment in which it has evolved to prosper.

== Use in falconry ==
This species is often used in falconry. It is the most popular falcon captured from the wild for falconry purposes in the United States, due to its abundance and relative ease to acquire. It is valued for its aggressiveness, agility, and determination to bring down game. Although some falconers considered the prairie falcon hard to train and unpredictable, others note that with proper training taking into account its impatient nature it may be as effective as the peregrine falcon. In his book The Hunting Falcon, biologist and falconer Bruce Haak states "In the field, the prairie falcon leaves no doubt that it can hold its own against the peregrine as a stylish and dedicated hunting companion."

The smaller and more agile males are particularly effective in the taking of small game birds such as dove, quail, and smaller ducks, while the larger and more powerful females reliably take larger game up through the size of large ducks and even pheasants. Some prairie falcons will strike still larger game such as geese and greater sage-grouse, but their willingness to do so runs the risk of injury to the falcon. The sage-grouse in particular is difficult game, with the males weighing as much as 8 lbs, and being so hard-muscled that inexperienced falcons can easily be injured in striking them in a high-speed stoop. It takes a skilled falcon that knows how to forcefully but carefully and accurately strike them in the head or wing to bring them down cleanly. For this difficult prey experienced falconers usually prefer larger peregrine females, gyrfalcons, or gyr-peregrine hybrids, though some female prairie falcons do master the art of bringing down larger game.

Proper training for prairie falcons includes providing abundant food when raising them (to avoid them developing the habit of screaming for food), and extensive "manning" (close contact and handling) when training them. Unlike the peregrine, they do not respond well to training with the swung lure, as missing the lure brings out their impatience. Teaching prairie falcons to climb and "wait on" to stoop on game is best accomplished by a reward system of flushing game or serving live birds such as pigeons for the falcon to chase when the falcon has assumed the proper position several hundred feet or more above the falconer. The prairie falcon's eagerness to hunt and chase requires that it be patiently taught that when it assumes the proper waiting on position the falconer can be trusted to reliably flush game. As the falcon comes to understand this, it learns to hunt as an effective team with the falconer.

The availability of commercially bred falcons has in recent years reduced the need to capture falcons from the wild for use in falconry. The prairie falcon along with the peregrine and gyrfalcon is now often available via captive breeding. The prairie falcon is also sometimes hybridized with the peregrine falcon or gyrfalcon to create a falcon combining the aggressiveness and heat tolerance of the prairie falcon with the easier trainability and slightly greater strength of the larger peregrine subspecies, or the greater horizontal speed and significantly larger size and strength of the gyrfalcon.

== Conservation and status ==
Due to this species' large range and apparently increasing population, it has been classified by the IUCN as least concern. However, it has experienced some local declines in Texas, California, British Columbia and Alberta as grasslands are developed for agriculture, suburbs, highways, and other automobile uses. Such a decline could result in an inability for birds to find mates or suitable habitats.

== Mortality and causes ==
A major contributor to mortality has been mammals like foxes and coyotes, as well as other large raptors like the Golden Eagle and Great horned owl (Bubo virginianus) but to a lesser extent, it has been observed that infestations of Haematosiphon inodorus and in some cases Oeciacus vicarius may be a cause of fledgling morbidity.

== Gallery ==
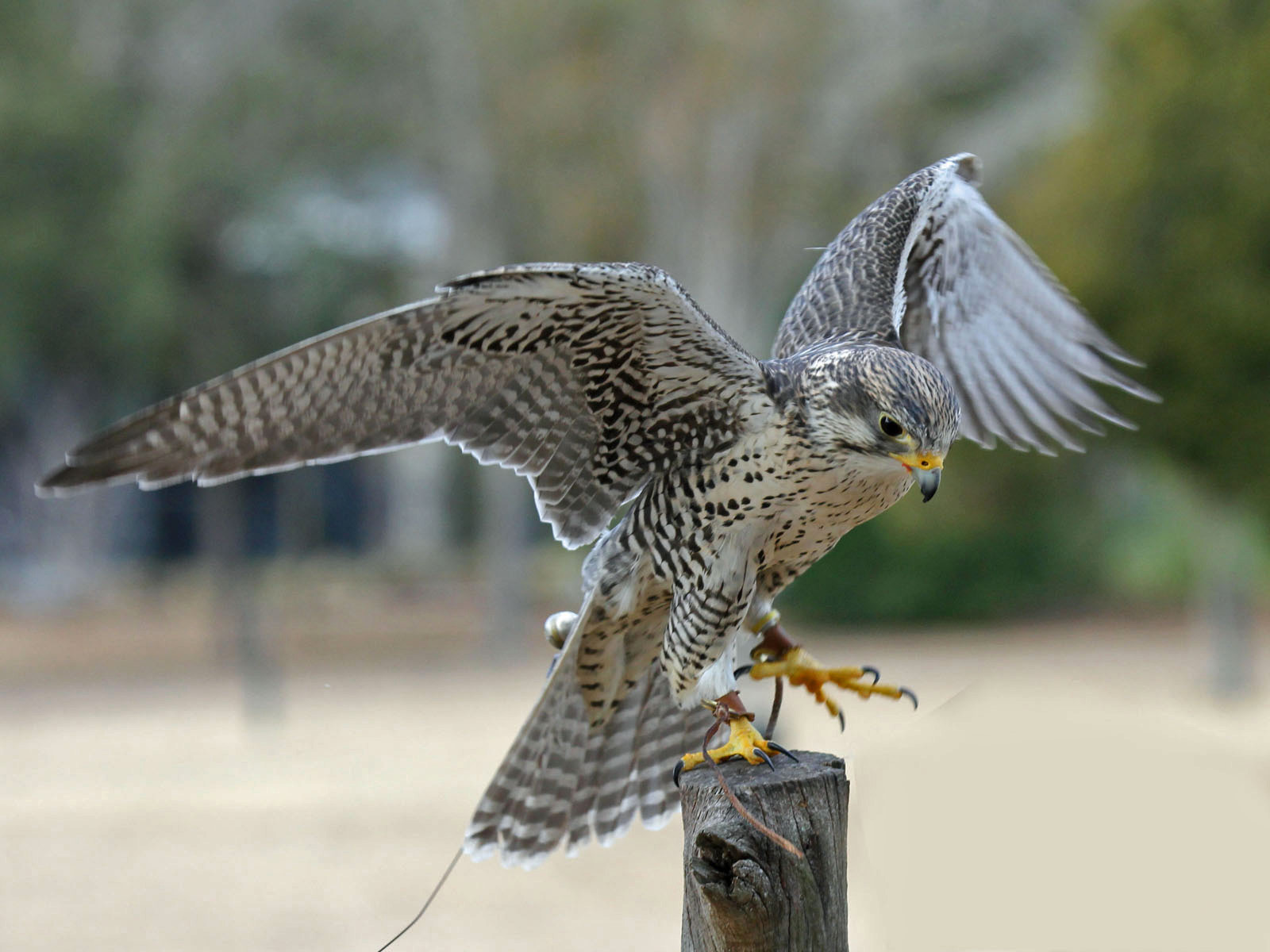
Prairie falcon - gyrfalcon hybrid at Avian Conservation Center, near Charleston, South Carolina, USA
