= List of beaches in Oregon =

List of beaches in Oregon enumerates all landmarks designated as a beach in the U.S. state of Oregon.

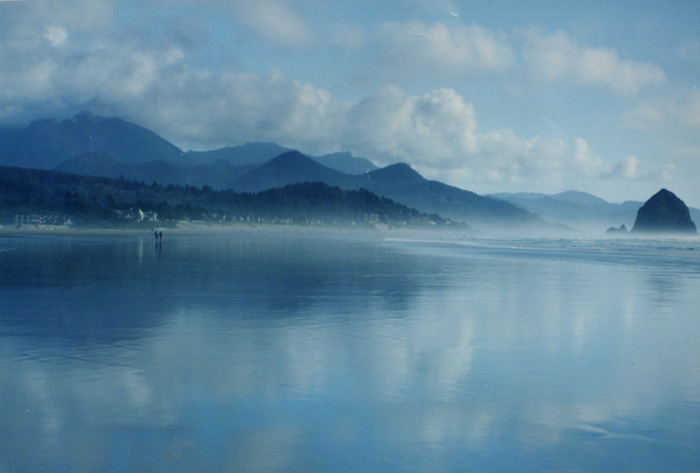
Cannon Beach facing south, with Haystack Rock on the right

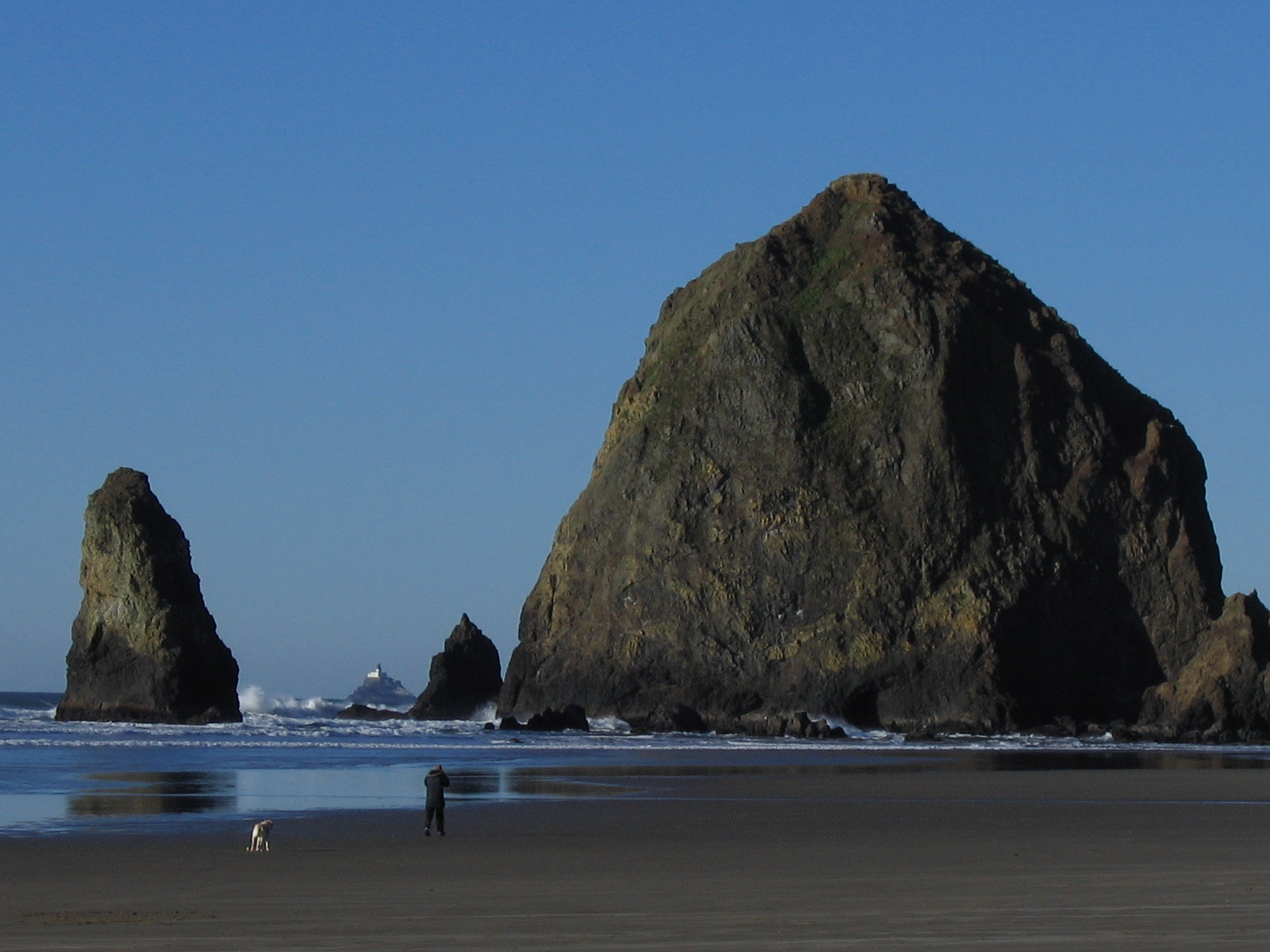
Haystack Rock at Cannon Beach

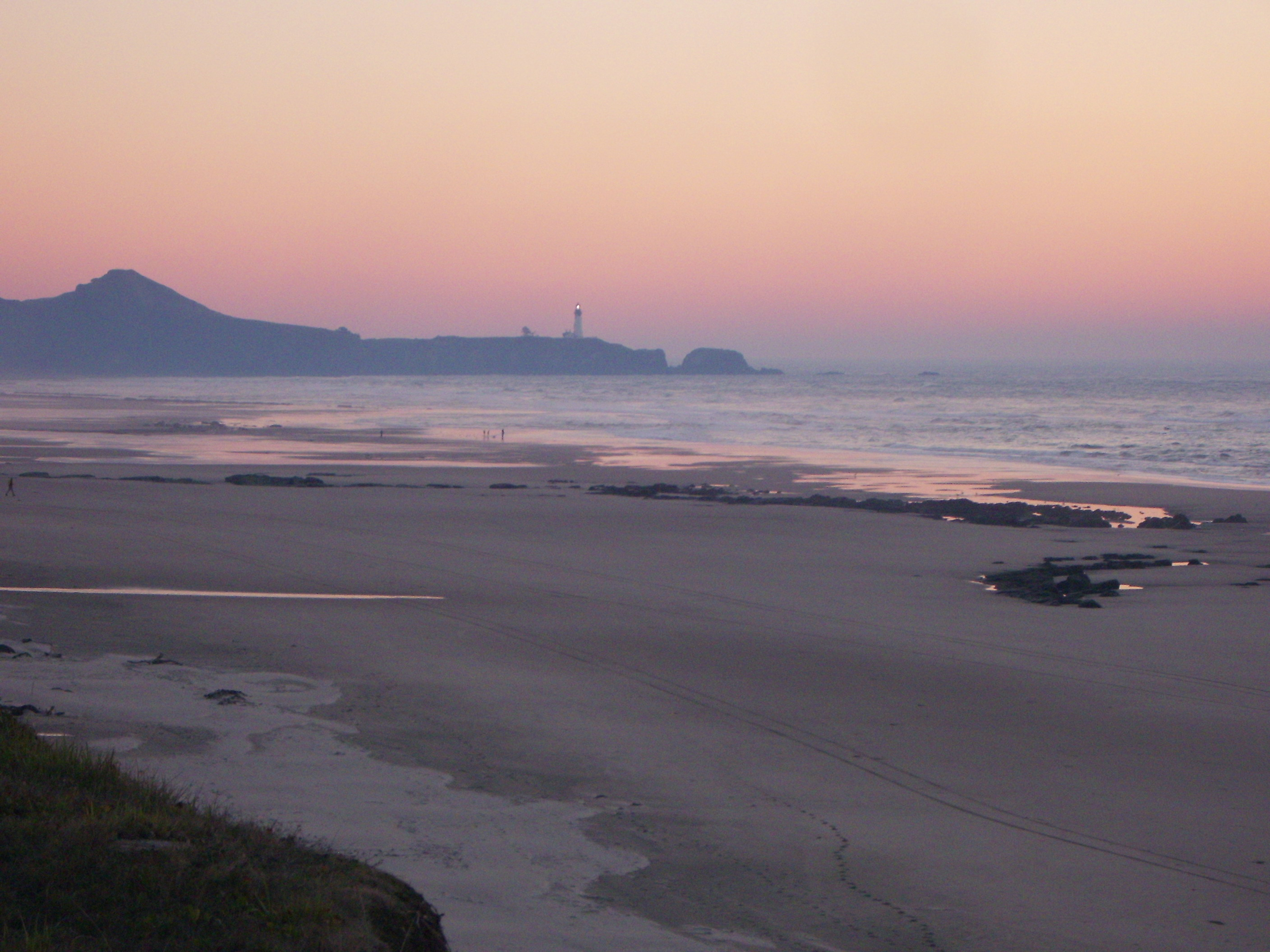
South view of Moolack Beach. The Yaquina Head Light is visible

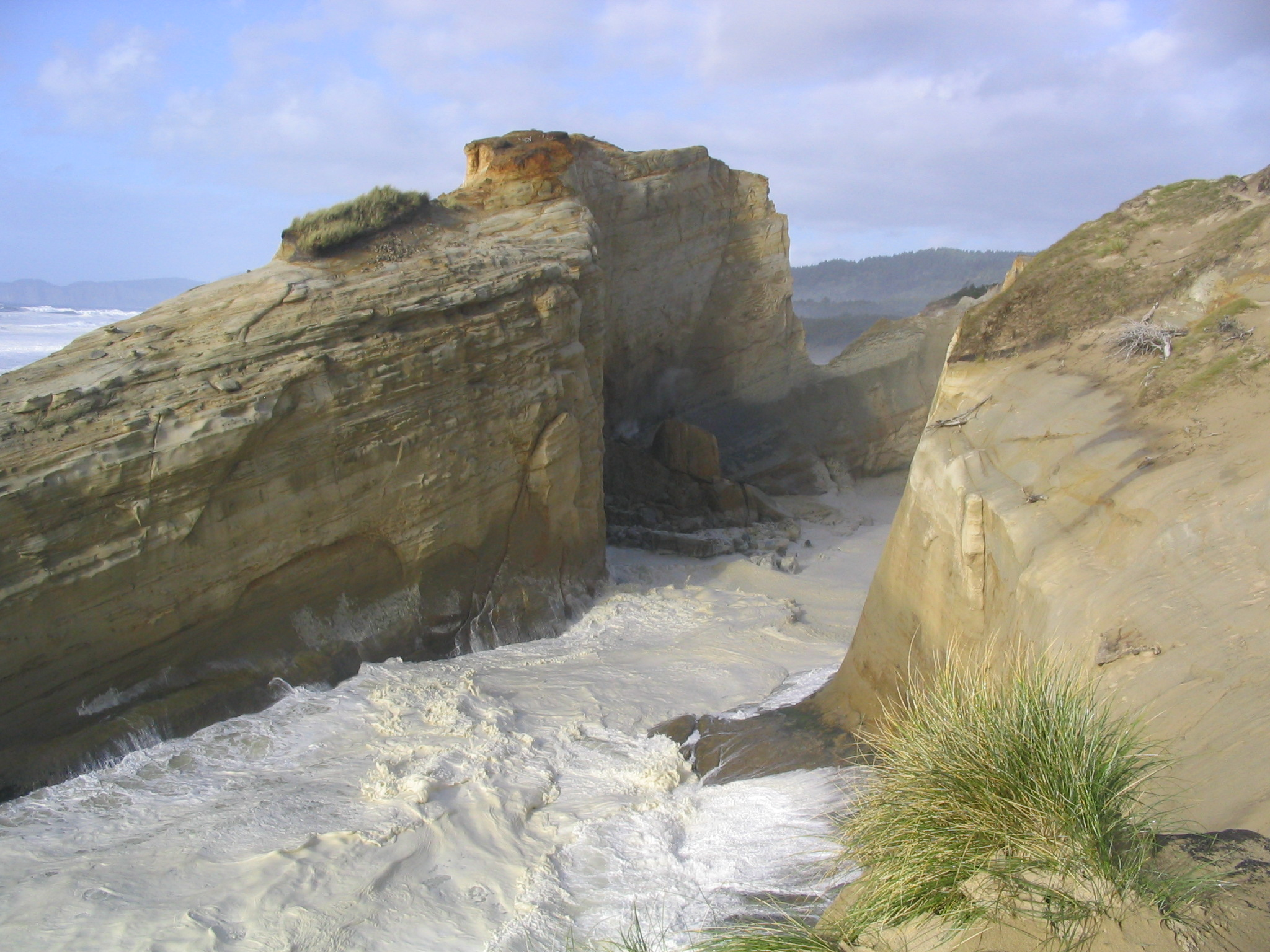
Cliffs beside a beach on the Oregon Coast

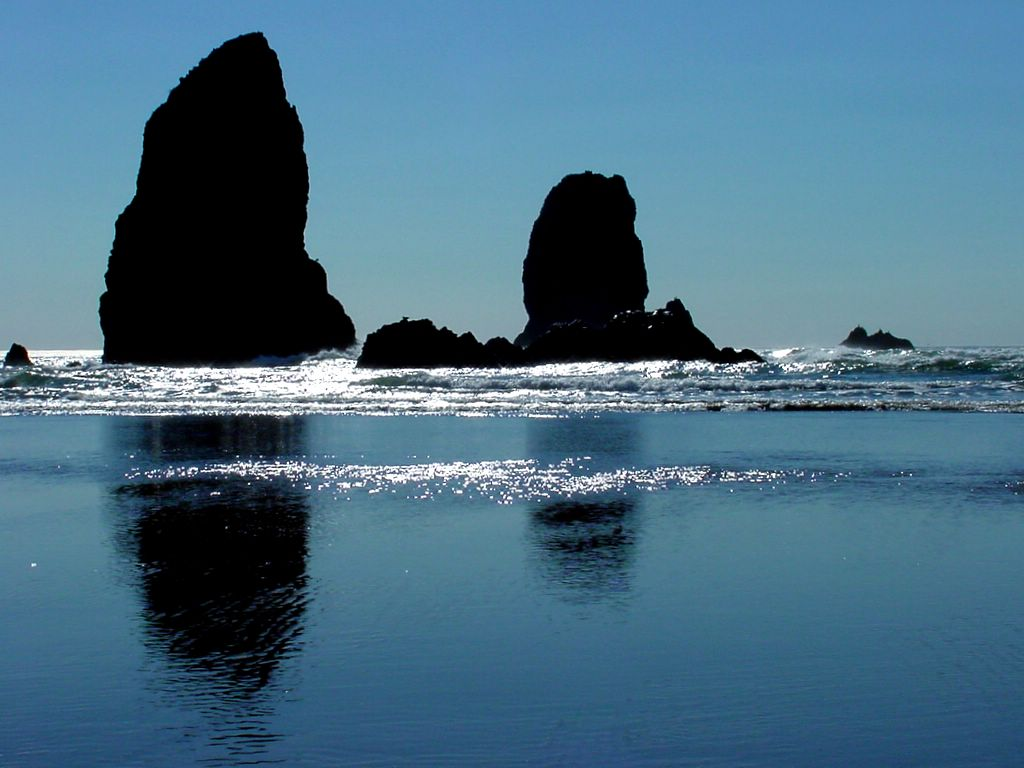
Rocks just off the Oregon Coast

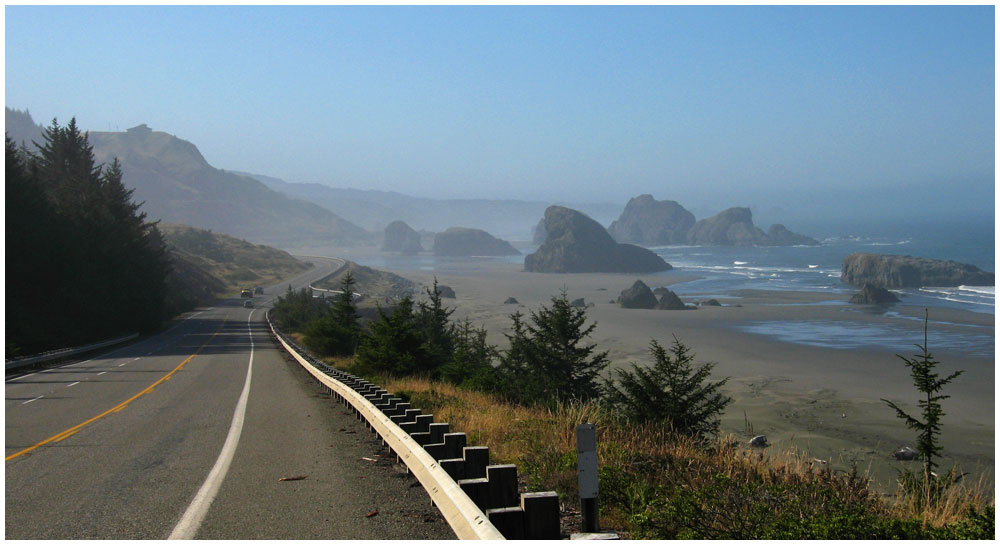
Beach north of Cape Sabastian near Gold Beach

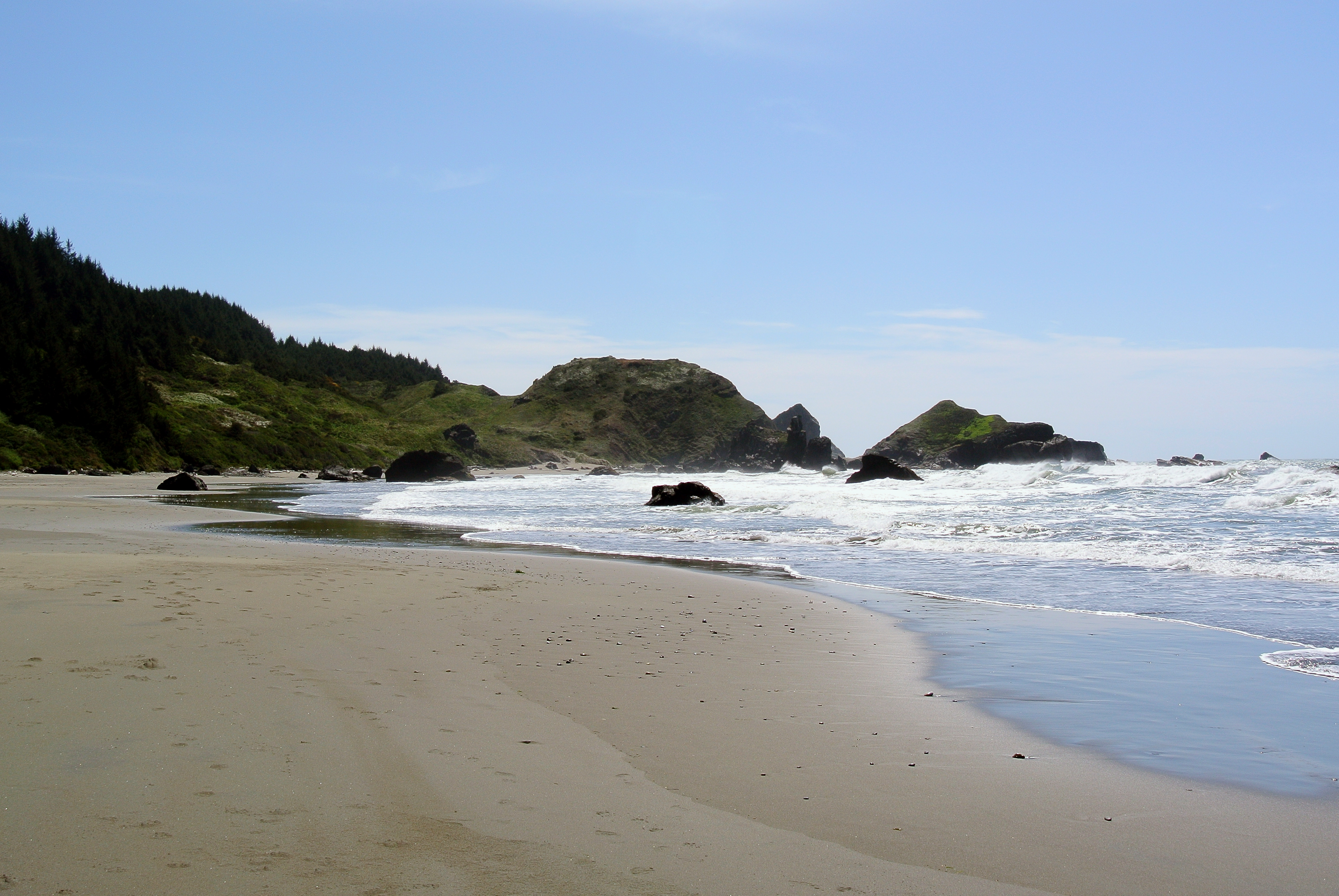
Lone Ranch Beach seen towards south

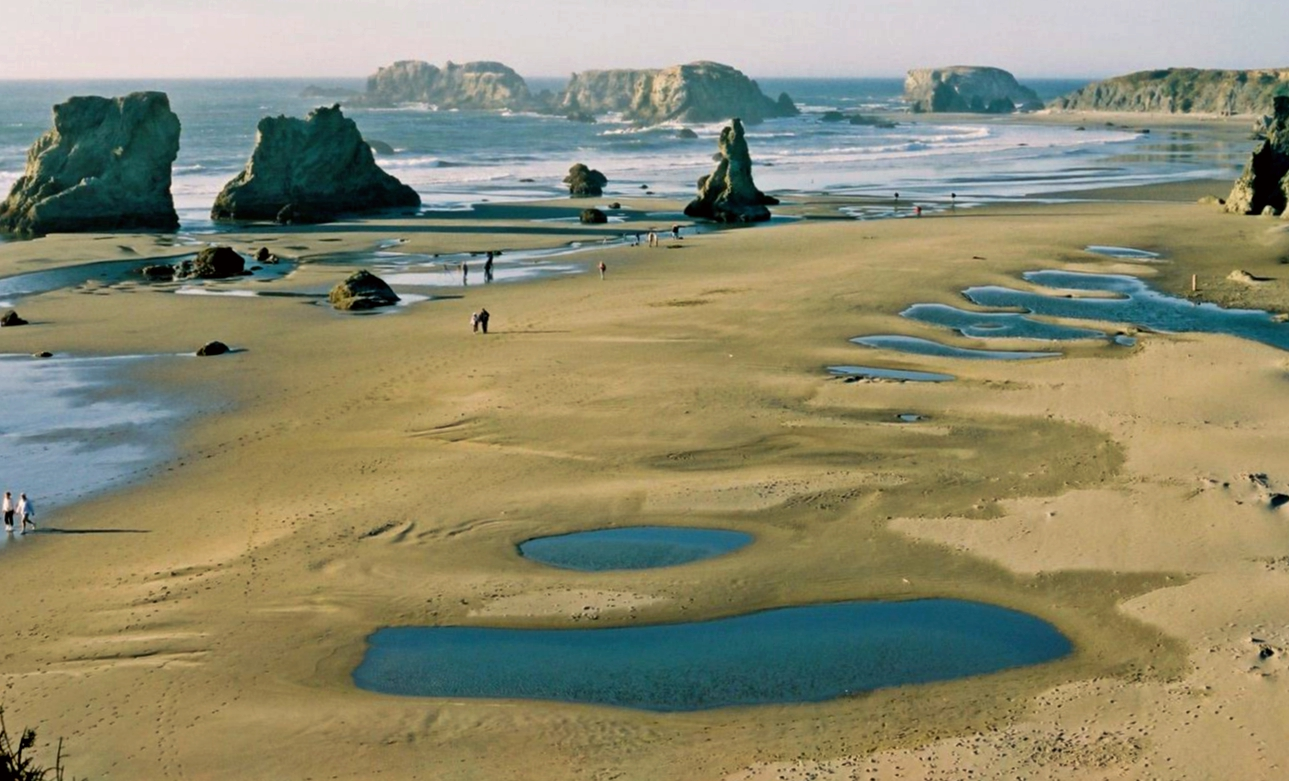
Bandon Beach

Name	Locality	Elevation	Coordinate	USGS map	GNIS ID
Agate Beach (Cape Arago, Oregon)	Coos County	13 ft (4.0 m)	43°15′11″N 124°23′14″W	Cape Arago	1116782
Agate Beach (Oceanside, Oregon)	Oceanside	13 ft (4.0 m)	45°27′57″N 123°58′28″W	Netarts	1135119
Agate Beach (Port Orford, Oregon)	Port Orford	23 ft (7.0 m)	42°44′52″N 124°30′49″W	Port Orford OE W	1135158
Agate Beach (Gold Beach, Oregon)	Curry County	3 ft (0.91 m)	42°28′14″N 124°25′19″W	Gold Beach	1154893
Arcadia Beach (Oregon)	Clatsop County	23 ft (7.0 m)	45°50′21″N 123°57′40″W	Arch Cape	1117027
Arizona Beach (Oregon)	Curry County	7 ft (2.1 m)	42°36′54″N 124°23′59″W	Ophir	1135018
Baker Beach (Oregon)	Lane County	10 ft (3.0 m)	44°04′34″N 124°07′36″W	Mercer Lake OE W	1154782
Bandon Beach (Coos County, Oregon)	Coos County	0 ft (0 m)	43°06′37″N 124°26′12″W	Bandon	1161647
Barley Beach (Oregon)	Curry County	36 ft (11 m)	42°27′24″N 124°25′19″W	Gold Beach	1154890
Bastendorff Beach	Coos County	0 ft (0 m)	43°20′43″N 124°20′54″W	Charleston	1161264
Broughton Beach	Multnomah County	10 ft (3.0 m)	45°35′59″N 122°36′19″W	Mount Tabor	1132082
Cannon Beach, Oregon	Clatsop County	20 ft (6.1 m)	45°52′54″N 123°57′51″W	Tillamook Head	1118563
Chapman Beach	Clatsop County	46 ft (14 m)	45°54′12″N 123°57′50″W	Tillamook Head	1118825
Cottonwood Beach (Oregon)	Columbia County	7 ft (2.1 m)	46°04′44″N 122°54′19″W	Rainier	1162770
Cove Beach, Oregon	Clatsop County	26 ft (7.9 m)	45°47′17″N 123°58′05″W	Arch Cape	1119403
Crescent Beach (Oregon)	Clatsop County	46 ft (14 m)	45°54′52″N 123°58′13″W	Tillamook Head	1119533
Dibblees Beach	Columbia County	3 ft (0.91 m)	46°07′01″N 122°59′19″W	Rainier	1162767
Goble Beach (Oregon)	Columbia County	10 ft (3.0 m)	46°01′09″N 122°52′29″W	Kalama	1130258
Harris Beach (Oregon)	Curry County	26 ft (7.9 m)	42°03′51″N 124°18′18″W	Brookings	1134651
Heceta Beach (Florence, Oregon)		39 ft (12 m)	44°02′01″N 124°07′48″W	Florence	
Holly Beach (Oregon)	Lincoln County	13 ft (4.0 m)	44°28′11″N 124°04′54″W	Waldport	1154807
Indian Beach (Oregon)	Clatsop County	33 ft (10 m)	45°55′40″N 123°58′40″W	Tillamook Head	1122197
Jones Beach (Oregon)	Columbia County	7 ft (2.1 m)	46°08′21″N 123°18′34″W	Nassa Point	1135010
Kiwanda Beach	Tillamook County	46 ft (14 m)	45°09′05″N 123°58′27″W	Nestucca Bay	1163088
Koberg Beach	Hood River County	79 ft (24 m)	45°41′57″N 121°28′03″W	White Salmon	1129632
Lighthouse Beach (Oregon)	Coos County	30 ft (9.1 m)	43°20′20″N 124°21′59″W	Charleston	1161417
Lone Ranch Beach	Curry County	3 ft (0.91 m)	42°05′54″N 124°20′34″W	Brookings	1134653
Lyons Beach (Oregon)	Columbia County	13 ft (4.0 m)	45°49′59″N 122°47′49″W	Saint Helens	1166955
McNary Beach (Oregon)	Umatilla County	344 ft (105 m)	45°55′44″N 119°16′54″W	Umatilla	1129673
Merchants Beach (Coos County, Oregon)	Coos County	0 ft (0 m)	43°14′13″N 124°23′31″W	Bullards	1161436
Moolack Beach	Lincoln County	0 ft (0 m)	44°41′59″N 124°03′55″W	Newport North	1124315
Nehalem Beach	Tillamook County	23 ft (7.0 m)	45°39′59″N 123°56′14″W	Nehalem	1158928
Neskowin Beach	Tillamook County	7 ft (2.1 m)	45°06′04″N 123°59′09″W	Neskowin	1153469
North Beach (Oregon)	Coos County	23 ft (7.0 m)	43°23′05″N 124°18′59″W	Empire	1161459
Nye Beach	Newport	23 ft (7.0 m)	44°38′32″N 124°03′44″W	Newport North	1124867
Ona Beach	Lincoln County	0 ft (0 m)	44°31′34″N 124°04′34″W	Newport South	1154766
Ophir Beach	Curry County	82 ft (25 m)	42°32′59″N 124°23′39″W	Ophir	1154674
Red Mill Beach (Oregon)	Columbia County	3 ft (0.91 m)	46°05′14″N 122°55′19″W	Rainier	1162771
Sacchi Beach	Coos County	16 ft (4.9 m)	43°15′51″N 124°23′01″W	Cape Arago	1126400
San Salvador Beach (Oregon)	Marion County	79 ft (24 m)	45°13′18″N 123°01′37″W	Dayton	1126547
Short Beach (Oregon)	Tillamook County	115 ft (35 m)	45°28′29″N 123°58′06″W	Netarts	1149423
Short Sand Beach	Clatsop County	59 ft (18 m)	45°45′45″N 123°58′02″W	Arch Cape	1126922
Sixes Beach (Oregon)	Curry County	0 ft (0 m)	42°51′04″N 124°32′44″W	Cape Blanco	1132532
Sundial Beach (Oregon)	Troutdale	20 ft (6.1 m)	45°34′00″N 122°24′18″W	Camas	1158512
Sunset Beach State Recreation Site	Clatsop County	20 ft (6.1 m)	46°05′19″N 123°56′09″W	Gearhart	1127744
Sunset Beach (Tillamook County, Oregon)	Tillamook County	33 ft (10 m)	45°41′38″N 123°56′20″W	Nehalem	1135944
Sunset Beach (Seaside, Oregon)	Seaside County	108 ft (33 m)	45°58′29″N 123°56′49″W	Tillamook Head	1162087
Wakeman Beach (Oregon)	Curry County	13 ft (4.0 m)	42°29′14″N 124°25′14″W	Gold Beach	1154894
Westport Beach (Oregon)	Westport	7 ft (2.1 m)	46°08′39″N 123°22′44″W	Cathlamet	1160974
Whisky Run Beach (Oregon)	Bandon	10 ft (3.0 m)	43°12′42″N 124°23′42″W	Bullards	1161587
Wilson Beach (Oregon)	Netarts	43 ft (13 m)	45°25′41″N 123°56′16″W	Netarts	1152448

Not listed above:

- Gold Beach
- Manzanita Beach
- Seaside Beach, Seaside
- Oceanside
  - Tunnel Beach
  - Oceanside Beach State Park
- Hubbard Creek Beach
- Newport
  - South Beach State Park
- Depoe Bay
  - Depoe Bay Beach
  - Whale Cove National Wildlife Refuge
- Lincoln City
  - Nelscott Beach
  - Lincoln City Beach
- Rockaway Beach
  - Manhattan Beach State Recreation Site
  - Diamond Beach
  - Nadonna Beach
- Yachats
  - Yachats Ocean Road State Natural Site
- Cape Cove Beach (Cape Perpetua)

== See also ==
- List of beaches
- List of shoals of Oregon
- Lists of Oregon-related topics
- List of beaches in the United States
