= Otter Point State Recreation Site =

State park in Oregon, United States

- Location within Oregon Location within the United States
- Type: Public, state
- Location: Curry County, Oregon
- Nearest city: Gold Beach
- Coordinates: 42°27′44″N 124°25′24″W
- Operator: Oregon Parks and Recreation Department

Otter Point State Recreation Site is a state park in the U.S. state of Oregon, administered by the Oregon Parks and Recreation Department. The part is located near the cities of Brookings, Oregon and Gold Beach, Oregon.

Otter Point State Recreation Site is on land acknowledged as the ancestral land of the Tolowa Dee-ni’, Confederated Tribes of Siletz Indians, Cayuse, Umatilla and Walla Walla nations.

== See also ==
- List of Oregon state parks
- Barley Beach
- Bailey Beach
