= Wedderburn, Oregon =

Unincorporated community in the state of Oregon, United States

- Unincorporated community
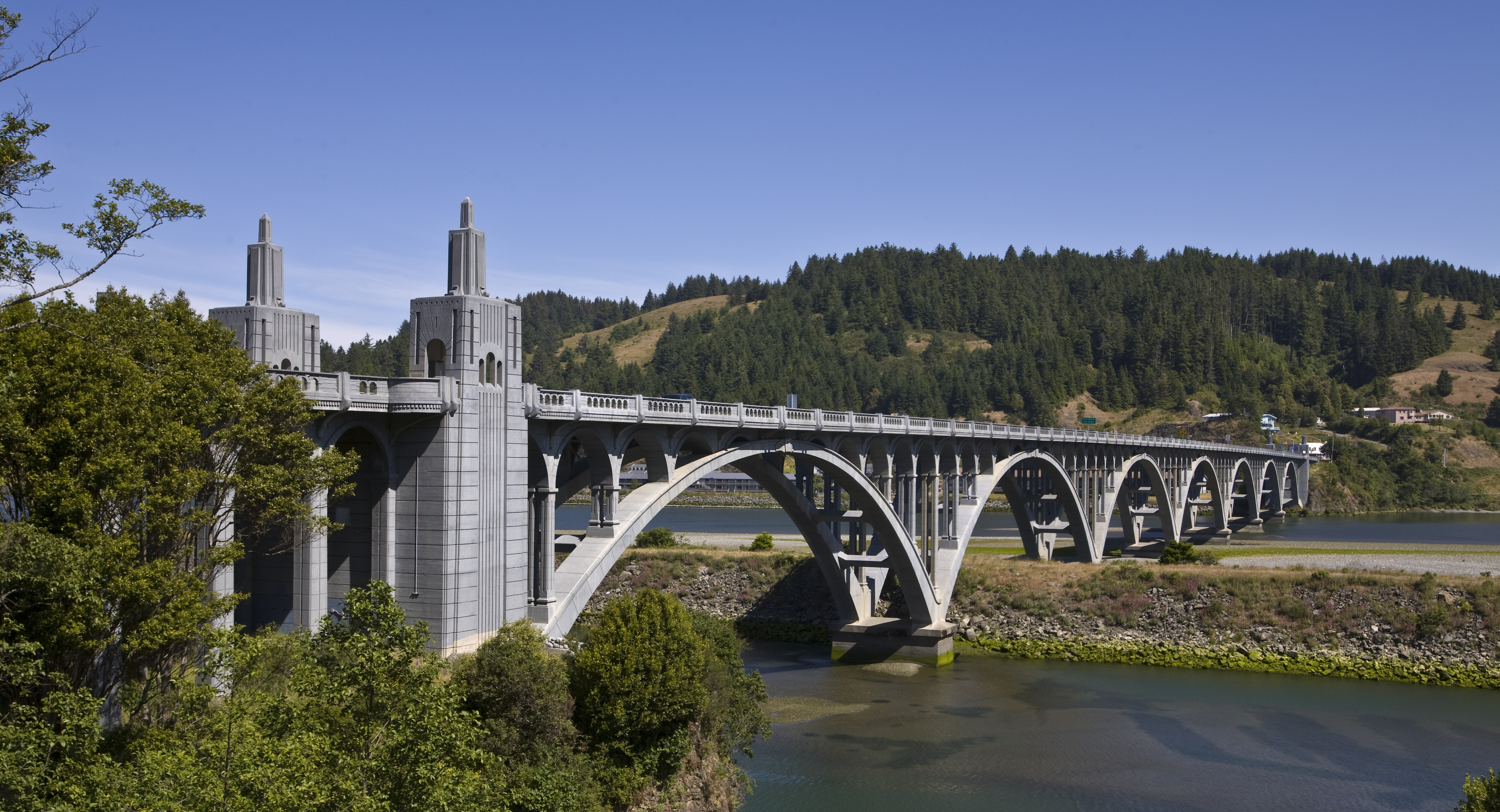
- Wedderburn can be seen from across the Isaac Lee Patterson Bridge.

- Location within the state of Oregon Wedderburn (the United States)
- Coordinates: 42°25′58″N 124°25′24″W
- Country: United States
- State: Oregon
- County: Curry

Area
  - Total: 1.26 sq mi (3.26 km^{2})
  - Land: 1.06 sq mi (2.74 km^{2})
  - Water: 0.20 sq mi (0.52 km^{2})
- Elevation: 289 ft (88 m)

Population (2020)
  - Total: 426
  - Density: 403.1/sq mi (155.62/km^{2})
- Time zone: UTC-8 (Pacific (PST))
  - Summer (DST): UTC-7 (PDT)
- ZIP code: 97444
- Area codes: 458 and 541
- FIPS code: 41-79500
- GNIS feature ID: 2805463

Wedderburn is an unincorporated coastal community in Curry County, Oregon, United States. It is to the north of, and across the mouth of the Rogue River from Gold Beach, on U.S. Route 101. The Isaac Lee Patterson Bridge connects Wedderburn with Gold Beach.

== History ==
Wedderburn was founded by R. D. Hume, a prominent local businessman in the fishing industry, who named the community after the home of his ancestors, Wedderburn Castle in Scotland. Wedderburn post office was established in 1895.

Wedderburn was originally a company town for Hume's salmon fishing monopoly, and besides his fishing fleet, he ran Wedderburn's cannery, store, race track and cold storage plant. Hume had settled at the mouth of the Rogue in 1876, and he eventually owned all the land on both banks of the river from the Pacific Ocean to the head of the tidewater.

== Climate ==
This region experiences warm (but not hot) and dry summers, with no average monthly temperatures above 71.6 °F (22.0 °C). According to the Köppen Climate Classification system, Wedderburn has a warm-summer Mediterranean climate, abbreviated "Csb" on climate maps.

== Education ==
It is in the Central Curry School District, which operates two schools: Riley Creek Elementary School (K-8) and Gold Beach High School.

The entire county is in the Southwestern Oregon Community College district.

== Demographics ==
Historical population
Census	Pop.	Note	%±
2020	426		—
U.S. Decennial Census
