= Bagnell Ferry, Oregon =

Unincorporated community in the state of Oregon, United States

Bagnell Ferry
- Unincorporated community
- Location within Oregon Location within the United States
- Coordinates: 42°27′59″N 124°22′04″W
- Country: United States
- State: Oregon
- County: Curry
- Elevation: 30 ft (9.1 m)
- Time zone: UTC-8 (Pacific (PST))
  - Summer (DST): UTC-7 (PDT)
- GNIS feature ID: 1132621

Bagnell Ferry is an unincorporated community in Curry County, Oregon, United States. It lies along the north bank of the Rogue River about 5 miles (8 km) upstream of Gold Beach.

The community is named after William Bagnell, who operated a river ferry at this location. A post office named Bagnell opened here in 1894 but closed less than a year later. John R. Miller was its first and only postmaster.
