= KGBR =

- Gold Beach, Oregon; United States
- Frequency: 92.7 MHz
- Branding: The Bridge

Programming
- Format: Classic hits

Ownership
- Owner: St. Marie Communications, Inc.

History
- First air date: 1986
- Call sign meaning: Gold Beach Radio

Technical information
- Licensing authority: FCC
- Facility ID: 62150
- Class: A
- ERP: 265 watts
- HAAT: 314 meters (1030 feet)
- Transmitter coordinates: 42°23′50″N 124°21′50″W

Links
- Public license information: Public file; LMS
- Webcast: Listen live
- Website: kgbr.com

KGBR (92.7 FM, "The Bridge") is a radio station licensed to serve Gold Beach, Oregon, United States. St. Marie Communications, Inc. owns the station, which began regular broadcasting in 1986.

== Programming ==
KGBR broadcasts a classic hits music format from a transmitter located atop Grizzly Mountain, in Curry County, Oregon. In addition to its usual music programming, KGBR airs the following programs, NW Outdoors Radio, Nationally syndicated Greatest Hits USA, The Ultimate Oldies Show, The Golden Days Of Radio, Locally produced "Ol' Hippie Rock n Roll Oldies Show with Bruce Greive & Country Comfort Radio hosted by Ryan West. Syndicated series Eye On Veterans, Sunday Morning Gospel, Golf with Jay Delsing.

== History ==
This station received its original construction permit from the Federal Communications Commission (FCC) on January 27, 1981. The new station was assigned the call letters KGBR by the FCC. In November 1982, permit holder James N. Hoff applied to transfer the construction permit for this station to George L. Chambers and Bonnie L. Chambers, doing business as Chambers Broadcasting. The deal was approved by the FCC on February 8, 1983, and the transaction was consummated on April 28, 1983.

Chambers Broadcasting announced a deal in October 1986 to transfer the KGBR permit to Republic Communications of Oregon, Inc. The deal was approved by the FCC on November 5, 1986. This would prove short-lived as Republic Communications of Oregon, Inc., reached an agreement in January 1987 to sell this station to St. Marie Communications, Inc. The deal was approved by the FCC on March 11, 1987, and the transaction was consummated on March 20, 1987.

After multiple extensions and permit holder transfers, KGBR finally received its license to cover from the FCC on June 25, 1987.

== Former on-air staff ==
- Ron Lyons, a radio announcer in the San Francisco Bay area for more than 40 years, retired to Gold Beach in 2004 where he hosted the weekday afternoon "The Ron Lyons Show" on KGBR. Arriving in California in 1960, Lyons worked at several radio stations, sold waterbeds, and did voice work for a Sacramento television station before spending 14 years on KCBS (740 AM) doing traffic reports. He once advised his son Sean, now a disc jockey known as "Tom Berlin", against a career in radio by saying "Sell coke, run guns ... but don't ever go into radio." Lyons died on August 3, 2007, after "a battle with cancer".
