= Gold Beach High School =

Location
- 29516 Ellensburg Avenue; Gold Beach, (Curry County), Oregon 97444; United States; 42.408544°N 124.421339°W

Information
- Type: Public
- School district: Central Curry School District
- Principal: William Schildbach
- Teaching staff: 13.68 (FTE)
- Grades: 7 - 12
- Enrollment: 194 (2023–2024)
- Student to teacher ratio: 14.18
- Colors: Black, gold, and green
- Athletics conference: OSAA 3a-2a Sunset Hybrid
- Mascot: Panther
- Website: www.ccsd.k12.or.us/GBHS

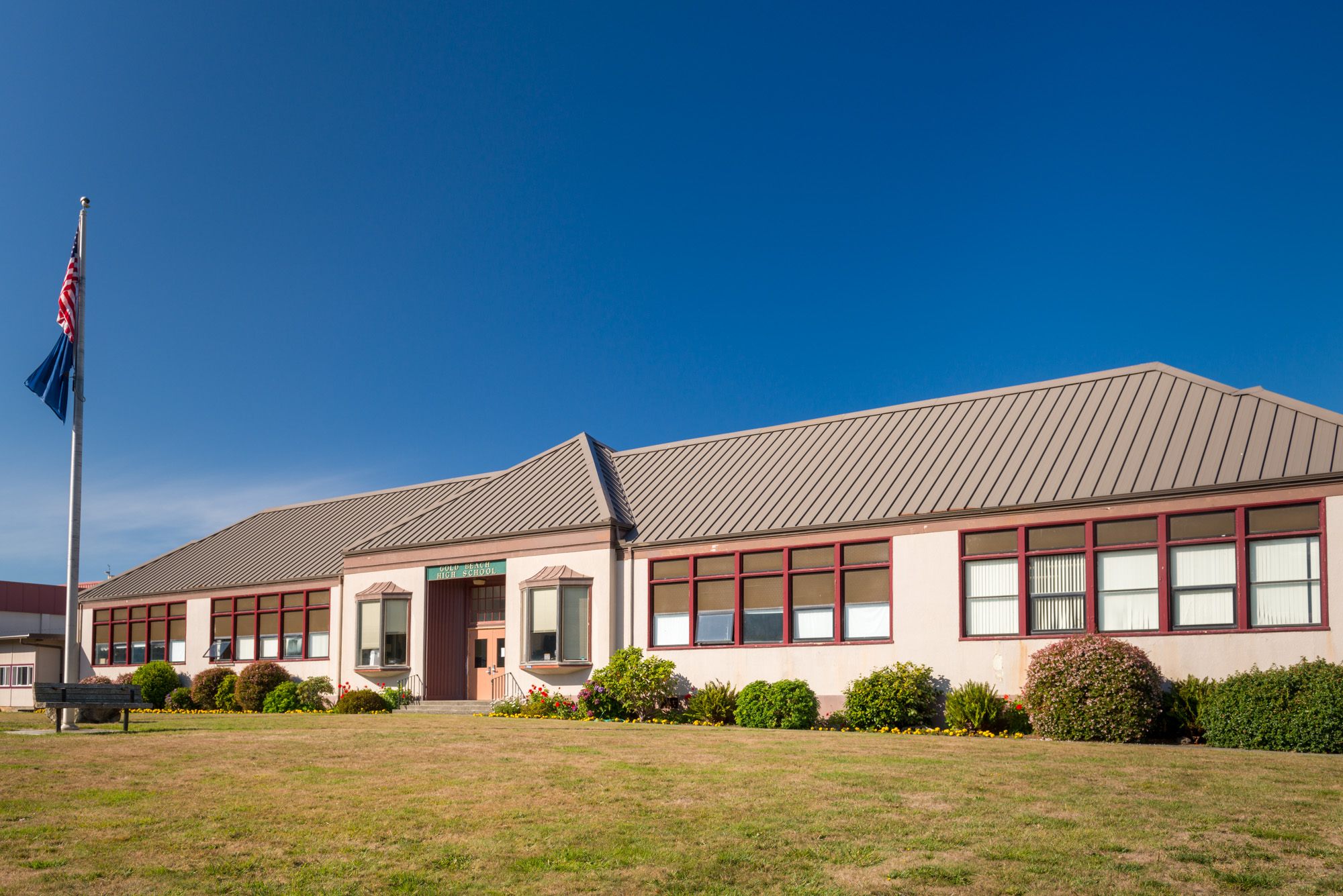
Gold Beach High School, Gold Beach

Gold Beach High School is a public high school in Gold Beach, Oregon, United States. It is a part of the Central Curry School District.

In addition to Gold Beach, the district's boundary includes Nesika Beach, Pistol River, and Wedderburn. It also includes the remote community of Agness.

== Academics ==
In 2008, 100% of the school's seniors received their diploma. Of 67 students, 55 graduated, nine dropped out, and three received a modified diploma.

The district requires all seniors to develop a senior project focusing on their career aspirations and goals. Volunteers from the county mentor students on these projects; over 40 volunteers donate more than 1000 hours of their time each year for such events.

== Clubs ==
Gold Beach High School has the National Honor Society. They also have a mathletes team, Knowledge Bowl (who have gone to nationals in 2019), and a pep band.

== Sports ==
Gold Beach is known for its football program, previously coached by the school's athletic director Kevin Swift. The Gold Beach football team Camp has been operating since 1993, 16 years of that under the direction of Kevin Swift. The camp no longer operates. The football team won championship titles in 2007 and 2011.

The school also has cross country, volleyball, boys and girls basketball, baseball, softball, track, and wrestling.
