= Ophir Beach =

Beach on the Oregon Coast, United States

Coordinates: 42.54983°N 124.39427°W

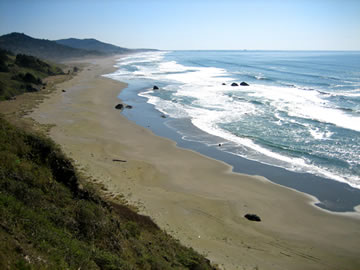
Ophir Beach looking southward

Ophir Beach is an undeveloped sandy beach on the Oregon Coast seven miles north of Gold Beach in Curry County, United States. It is more than 8.5 kilometres (5.3 mi) in length with the south end at Nesika Beach and the north end at a cape named the Devils Backbone. The beach is bounded by U.S. Route 101 on the east. Euchre Creek flows westward to the ocean cutting through the northern third of the beach.

There is a state maintained safety rest area at Ophir Beach with picnic tables and restrooms.

This beach is sometimes referred to as Nesika Beach.
