= Hunter Creek, Oregon =

Unincorporated community in Oregon, US

Hunter Creek
- Unincorporated community
- Location within Oregon Location within the United States
- Coordinates: 42°23′14″N 124°25′04″W
- Country: United States
- State: Oregon
- County: Curry
- Elevation: 66 ft (20 m)
- Time zone: UTC-8 (Pacific (PST))
  - Summer (DST): UTC-7 (PDT)
- GNIS feature ID: 1154874

Hunter Creek is an unincorporated community in Curry County, Oregon, United States. It lies on the east side of U.S. Route 101 south of Gold Beach along the Pacific coast. Hunter Creek, a stream with the same name, flows by the community before entering the Pacific Ocean slightly west of Route 101.
