= Central Curry School District =

School district in Oregon, USA

Central Curry School District 1

Central Curry School District 1 (CCSD) is a public school district headquartered in Gold Beach in Curry County, Oregon, United States.

Its boundary, in Curry County, includes Gold Beach, Nesika Beach, Pistol River, and Wedderburn as well as the surrounding area. It also includes the remote community of Agness.

== History ==
CCSD was formed in 1997 when four elementary school districts and one high school district were merged, because of an action by the Oregon State Legislature that required districts without a kindergarten through twelfth grade (K-12) educational program to merge into a single district that did offer such a program.

The districts that merged were: Gold Beach Union High School District, Riley Creek Elementary School District, Ophir Elementary School District, Pistol River Elementary School District and Agness Elementary School District, each of which was a one-building district. Ophir Elementary School and Pistol River School were closed and the properties sold.

== Demographics ==
In the 2009 school year, the district had 38 students classified as homeless by the Department of Education, or 5.8% of students in the district.

== Schools ==
Riley Creek Elementary School, serving students from kindergarten through eighth grade, and Gold Beach High School, serving grades 9 through 12, are located in Gold Beach.

=== Former schools ===
Agness Elementary, serving grades kindergarten through fifth grade, was located in Agness. From circa 1947, and into 1997, its enrollment was around six. In 1997 the community promoted a bill in the Oregon Legislature, House Bill 2340 which would make it so small schools like Agness would not be affected by school mergers required by the state. In 2003 the school had a teacher and one aide, along with four students. Agness Elementary was closed in 2010 due to the town's decline in a young population.

The Agness Community Library is in the former school building.

== See also ==
- List of school districts in Oregon
