= Gold Beach Municipal Airport =

Airport in Oregon, United States

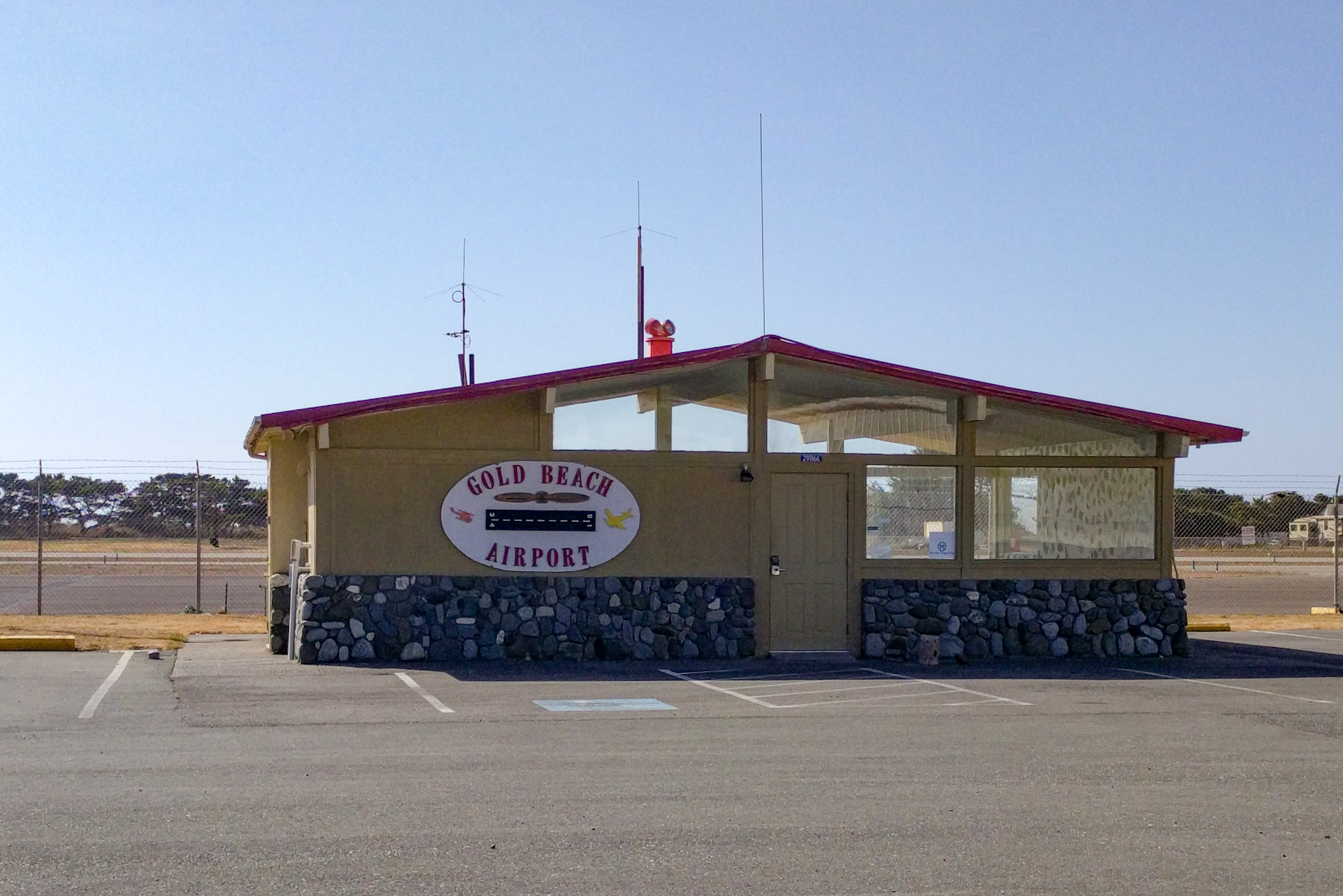
- IATA: GOL; ICAO: none; FAA LID: 4S1

Summary
- Airport type: Public
- Owner: Port of Gold Beach
- Serves: Gold Beach, Oregon
- Elevation AMSL: 20 ft (6.1 m)
- Coordinates: 42°24′55″N 124°25′30″W

Map
- Location of airport in Oregon

Runways
Direction	Length		Surface
Direction	ft	m	Surface
16/34	3,237	987	Asphalt

Statistics (2010)
- Aircraft operations: 5,550
- Based aircraft: 13
- Source: Federal Aviation Administration

Gold Beach Municipal Airport (IATA: GOL, FAA LID: 4S1) is a public use airport located in Gold Beach, a city in Curry County, Oregon, United States. It is owned by the Port of Gold Beach. This airport is included in the National Plan of Integrated Airport Systems for 2011–2015, which categorized it as a general aviation facility.

== Facilities and aircraft ==
Gold Beach Municipal Airport covers an area of 48 acres (19 ha) at an elevation of 20 feet (6 m) above mean sea level. It has one runway designated 16/34 with an asphalt surface measuring 3,237 by 75 feet (987 x 23 m).

For the 12-month period ending June 1, 2010, the airport had 5,550 aircraft operations, an average of 15 per day: 83% general aviation, 14% air taxi, and 3% military. At that time there were 13 aircraft based at this airport: 92% single-engine and 8% ultralight.
