= Barley Beach =

Beach in Oregon

Coordinates: 42.45678°N 124.42205°W

Barley Beach is the official GNIS name given to an undeveloped sandy beach on the Oregon Coast immediately north of Gold Beach in Curry County, United States. It is more than 4.5 kilometres (2.8 mi) in length with the south end at the Rogue River and the north end at Otter Point. The beach is bounded by the Old Coast Road on the east.

This beach is sometimes referred to as Bailey Beach which may indicate that the official name listed in the GNIS is misspelled or otherwise incorrect.
