= Ophir, Oregon =

Unincorporated community in the state of Oregon, United States

- Unincorporated community
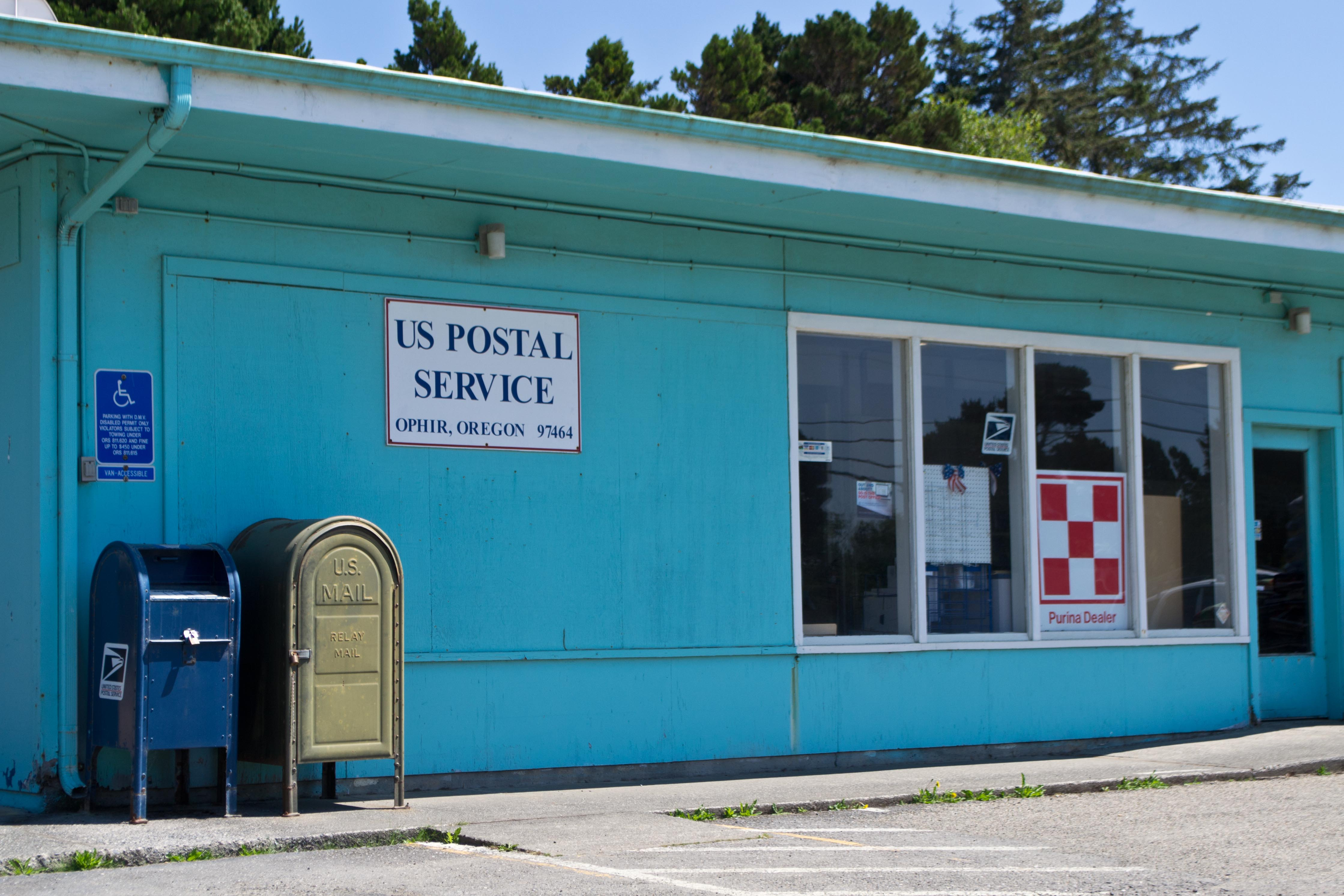

- Location within the state of Oregon Ophir (the United States)
- Coordinates: 42°33′47″N 124°22′58″W
- Country: United States
- State: Oregon
- County: Curry
- Elevation: 36 ft (11 m)
- Time zone: UTC-8 (Pacific (PST))
  - Summer (DST): UTC-7 (PDT)
- ZIP codes: 97464
- GNIS feature ID: 1147252

Ophir is an unincorporated community in Curry County, Oregon, United States. It has a post office with a ZIP code 97464. Ophir lies at the intersection of Oregon Route 515 and U.S. Route 101, northeast of Nesika Beach.
