= Nesika Beach, Oregon =

Unincorporated community in the state of Oregon, United States

- Census-designated place
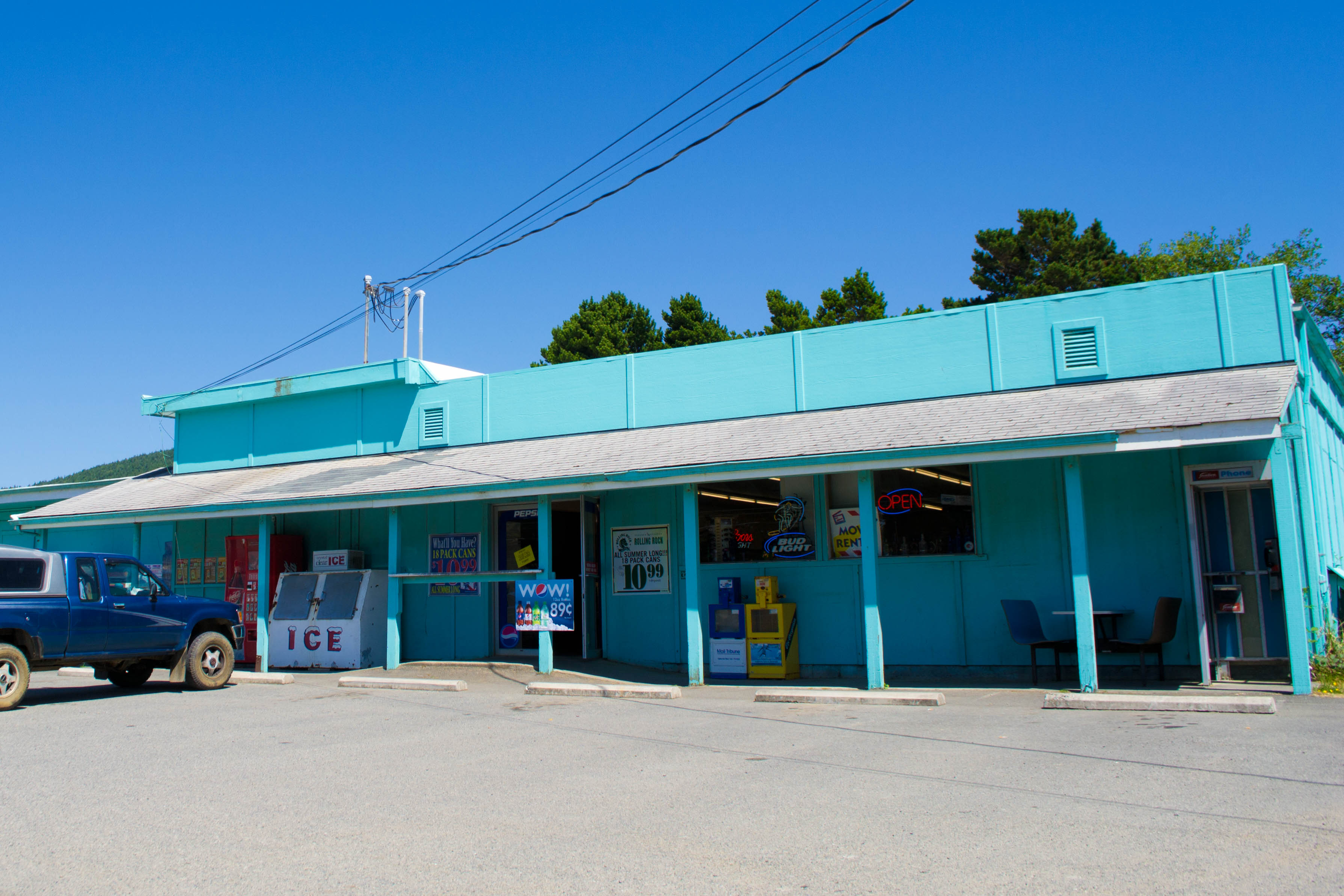
- Store at Nesika Beach

- Location within the state of Oregon Nesika Beach (the United States)
- Coordinates: 42°30′17″N 124°24′23″W
- Country: United States
- State: Oregon
- County: Curry

Area
  - Total: 2.28 sq mi (5.91 km^{2})
  - Land: 2.28 sq mi (5.91 km^{2})
  - Water: 0 sq mi (0.00 km^{2})
- Elevation: 210 ft (64 m)

Population (2020)
  - Total: 432
  - Density: 189.4/sq mi (73.11/km^{2})
- Time zone: UTC-8 (Pacific (PST))
  - Summer (DST): UTC-7 (PDT)
- ZIP code: 97444
- Area codes: 458 and 541
- FIPS code: 41-51950
- GNIS feature ID: 2611770

Nesika Beach is census-designated place and unincorporated community in Curry County, Oregon, United States. It is located 8 miles (13 km) north of Gold Beach on the Oregon Coast. As of the 2020 census it had a population of 432.

Nesika means "we", "us", or "our" in Chinook Jargon.

== Demographics ==
Historical population
Census	Pop.	Note	%±
2020	432		—
U.S. Decennial Census

== Education ==
It is in the Central Curry School District, which operates two schools: Riley Creek Elementary School (K-8) and Gold Beach High School. The entire county is in the Southwestern Oregon Community College district.

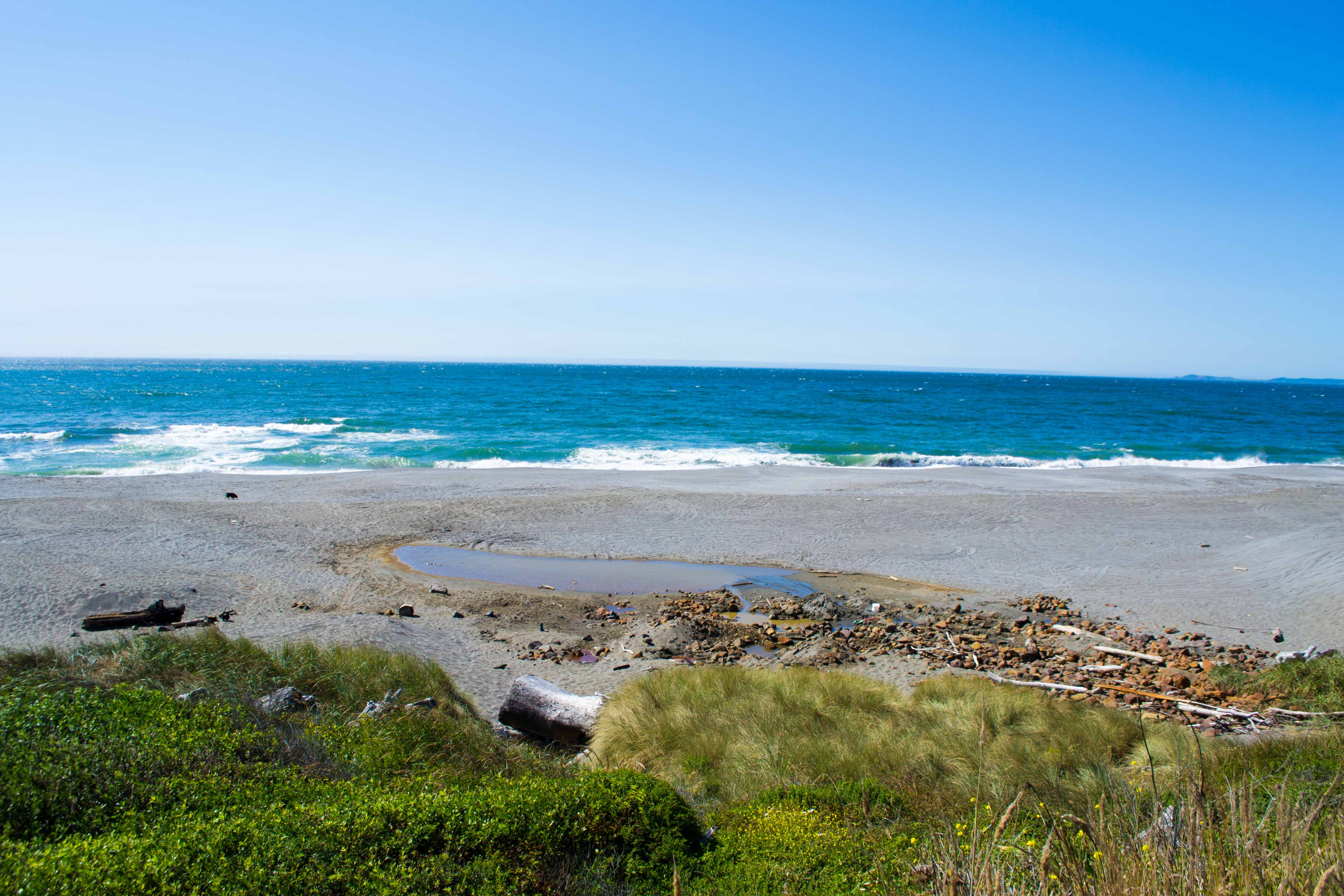
Nesika Beach

== Climate ==
Climate data for Nesika Beach, Oregon
Month	Jan	Feb	Mar	Apr	May	Jun	Jul	Aug	Sep	Oct	Nov	Dec	Year
Mean daily maximum °F (°C)	54.8 (12.7)	55.3 (12.9)	56.5 (13.6)	58.3 (14.6)	61.7 (16.5)	65.0 (18.3)	67.5 (19.7)	68.0 (20.0)	67.5 (19.7)	63.5 (17.5)	57.1 (13.9)	54.0 (12.2)	60.8 (16.0)
Mean daily minimum °F (°C)	41.6 (5.3)	41.6 (5.3)	42.2 (5.7)	43.5 (6.4)	46.7 (8.2)	49.8 (9.9)	52.4 (11.3)	52.7 (11.5)	50.9 (10.5)	47.7 (8.7)	43.9 (6.6)	41.0 (5.0)	46.2 (7.9)
Average precipitation inches (mm)	11.90 (302)	10.94 (278)	10.62 (270)	6.47 (164)	3.84 (98)	1.84 (47)	0.46 (12)	1.09 (28)	2.17 (55)	5.04 (128)	11.78 (299)	13.15 (334)	79.30 (2,014)

== See also ==
- Ophir Beach
