= Isaac Lee Patterson Bridge =

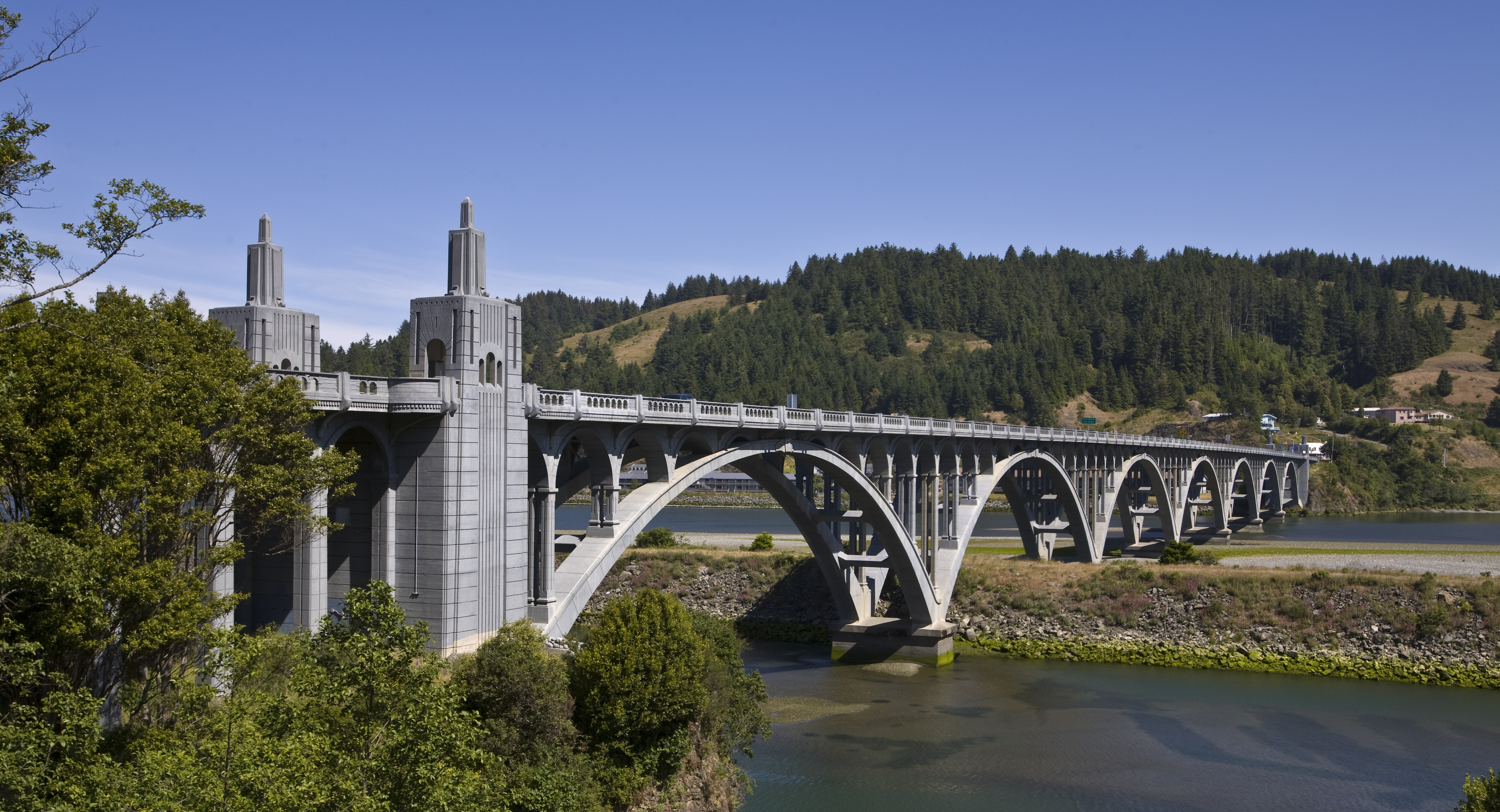
- Coordinates: 42.4272°N 124.4133°W
- Carries: 2 lanes of US 101
- Crosses: Rogue River
- Locale: Gold Beach, Oregon to Wedderburn, Oregon
- Maintained by: State of Oregon
- ID number: 01172 009 32764

Characteristics
- Design: Concrete arch-deck
- Total length: 591 metres (1,939 ft)
- Width: 8.2 metres (27 ft)
- Longest span: 70 metres (230 ft), 7 spans

History
- Opened: May 28, 1932

Statistics
- Daily traffic: 6200

Location
- Interactive map of Isaac Lee Patterson Bridge

- Rogue River Bridge No. 01172
- U.S. National Register of Historic Places
- Location within Oregon Location within the United States
- Location: OR Coast 9, US 101, MP 327.70, Gold Beach, Oregon
- Area: 2.6 acres (1.1 ha)
- Built: 1932
- Architect: Conde B. McCullough; Mercer-Fraser Co.
- MPS: McCullough, C. B., Major Oregon Coast Highway Bridges MPS
- NRHP reference No.: 05000814
- Added to NRHP: August 5, 2005

The Isaac Lee Patterson Bridge, also known as the Rogue River Bridge and the Isaac Lee Patterson Memorial Bridge, is a concrete arch bridge that spans the Rogue River in Curry County, Oregon. The bridge was constructed by the Mercer Fraser Company of Eureka, California. The bridge carries U.S. Route 101 across the river, near the point where the river empties into the Pacific Ocean, and connects the towns of Gold Beach and Wedderburn. A bridge with strong Art Deco influences, the Isaac Lee Patterson Bridge is a prominent example of the designs of the Oregon bridge designer and highway engineer Conde McCullough. It was designated a National Historic Civil Engineering Landmark by the American Society of Civil Engineers in 1982. It is part of a series of notable bridges designed by McCullough for the Oregon Coast Highway in the 1930s. It was placed on the National Register of Historic Places in 2005.

== History ==
The Oregon State Highway Department awarded the $568,181.00 ($11 million in 2025 dollars) construction contract to the Mercer, Fraser Company of Eureka, California, on January 16, 1930. Work began on the bridge at Gold Beach in April 1930. In order to avoid problems with concrete shrinkage that had plagued concrete arch bridges in the past, McCullough used the Freyssinet method of pre-tensioning the arches during construction using hydraulic jacks, using sixteen 250-ton jacks from Freyssinet's firm, enough to work with two arch panels at a time. McCullough's design was the first usage of this technique in the United States. The remote location of the building site presented a significant challenge, with reinforcing steel shipped southward from Port Orford, and built a concrete plant on the north bank of the river. Pilings for the piers were obtained locally. The bridge was planned to open in January 1932, but the ferry Rogue was damaged in December 1931 flooding and the bridge opened early, on December 24, 1931. It was dedicated on May 28, 1932, and named after Isaac Lee Patterson, the governor of Oregon from 1927 to 1929. The Mercer-Fraser Company presented the new bridge to the State on January 21, 1932, and the bridge was officially accepted as complete on January 27, 1932, at a final cost of $592,725.56.

== Description ==
The bridge is 1,938 feet (591 m) long and consists of seven 230-foot (70 m) deck arch spans and nine deck girder sections. The roadbed is 27 feet (8.2 m) wide, and the structure is 34 feet (10 m) wide overall. Piers 1 and 8, at the ends, rest on solid rock. The intermediate piers rest on driven timber pilings. Piers 2, 4, 5, and 7 rest on 180 vertical piles, while piers 3 and 6, required to resist lateral thrust, have 260 piers driven at an angle.

The detailing of the bridge incorporates Art Deco motifs, with prominent pylons at the ends with stepped Moderne elements and stylized Palladian windows crowned by sunbursts. The railings use a simplified, rectilinear Tuscan order with arches on short ribbed columns.

The bridge has required extensive preventive maintenance to mitigate deterioration due to the location's salt air. A $20 million rehabilitation ran from 2001 to 2004. A previous project in 1976 mitigated scouring problems at pier 2.

Construction of the bridge required the excavation of 10,174 cubic yards (7,779 m^{3}) of earth and consumed 27,016 linear feet (8,234 m) of piling, 15,591 cubic yards (11,920 m^{3}) of concrete, 1,764,981 pounds (800,582 kg) of reinforcing steel, and 114,109 pounds (51,759 kg) of structural steel.

== Designation ==
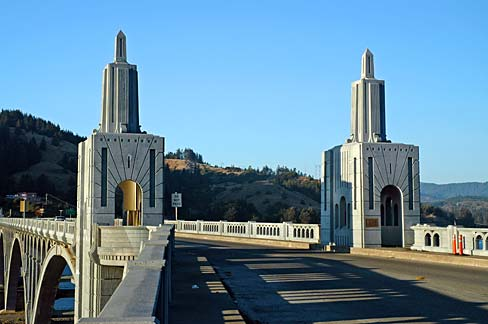
Entrance pylons

The Isaac Lee Patterson Bridge was placed on the National Register of Historic Places on August 5, 2005.

== See also ==
- List of bridges documented by the Historic American Engineering Record in Oregon
- List of bridges on U.S. Route 101 in Oregon
- List of bridges on the National Register of Historic Places in Oregon
