= Plum Trees, Oregon =

Unincorporated community in the state of Oregon, United States

Plum Trees
- Unincorporated community
- Location within Oregon Location within the United States
- Coordinates: 42°48′50″N 124°21′24″W
- Country: United States
- State: Oregon
- County: Curry
- Elevation: 217 ft (66 m)
- Time zone: UTC-8 (Pacific (PST))
  - Summer (DST): UTC-7 (PDT)
- GNIS feature ID: 1147806

Plum Trees is an unincorporated community in Curry County, Oregon, United States. It lies along the Sixes River, about 16 miles (26 km) upstream of its mouth on the Pacific Ocean near Cape Blanco. Sixes River Road runs by Plum Trees, which is adjacent to the Rogue River – Siskiyou National Forest slightly north of Grassy Knob Wilderness in the Klamath Mountains.
