= Manhattan Beach, Oregon =

Unincorporated community in the state of Oregon, United States

- Unincorporated community
- Location within Oregon Location within the United States
- Coordinates: 45°37′49″N 123°56′29″W
- Country: United States
- State: Oregon
- County: Tillamook
- Elevation: 16 ft (4.9 m)
- Time zone: UTC-8 (Pacific (PST))
  - Summer (DST): UTC-7 (PDT)
- ZIP code: 97136
- Area codes: 503 and 971
- GNIS feature ID: 1136511

Manhattan Beach is an unincorporated community in Tillamook County, Oregon, United States. It lies about a mile north of Rockaway Beach along U.S. Route 101. Manhattan Beach State Recreation Site is nearby.

The Pacific Railway and Navigation Company had a station here named Manhattan Beach when the line opened in 1912. The community's post office operated from 1914 to 1975.
