= Pistol River, Oregon =

Unincorporated community in the state of Oregon, United States

- Census-designated place
- Location within the state of Oregon Pistol River (the United States)
- Coordinates: 42°17′01″N 124°23′57″W
- Country: United States
- State: Oregon
- County: Curry

Area
  - Total: 0.60 sq mi (1.56 km^{2})
  - Land: 0.59 sq mi (1.53 km^{2})
  - Water: 0.012 sq mi (0.03 km^{2})
- Elevation: 200 ft (61 m)

Population (2020)
  - Total: 89
  - Density: 151.0/sq mi (58.32/km^{2})
- Time zone: UTC-8 (Pacific (PST))
  - Summer (DST): UTC-7 (PDT)
- ZIP code: 97444
- Area codes: 458 and 541
- FIPS code: 41-58050
- GNIS feature ID: 2611773

Pistol River (Tolowa: chvt-ler’sh-chvn-dvn taa-ghii~-li~’) is an unincorporated community and census-designated place in Curry County, Oregon, United States. As of the 2020 census, Pistol River had a population of 89. It is near the Pistol River and the Pistol River State Scenic Viewpoint, just to the east of U.S. Route 101.

The community of Pistol River takes its name from the stream that flows past it. James Mace, a militia soldier, lost a pistol in the river in 1853, during a skirmish of the Rogue River Wars, and it has been known as the Pistol River since then. The Pistol River post office was established in 1927.

The Pistol River area is known for its windsurfing, and the International Windsurfing Tour holds the Pistol River Wavebash there annually. Many say that Pistol River has the best windsurfing in the state.

Pistol River has a concert association that has hosted a monthly concert, often featuring nationally known acts, since 1982.

In 1984 John Kirkland of The World (of Coos Bay, Oregon) described Pistol River as having a "pioneer spirit" and "simplicity". Kirkland added that the community could be considered "a throwback to an earlier point in American history."

== Education ==
It is in the Central Curry School District, which operates two schools: Riley Creek Elementary School (K-8) and Gold Beach High School.

The entire county is in the Southwestern Oregon Community College district.

Pistol River previously had its own school district, Pistol River Elementary School District. In 1984 it had two teachers and 17 students, with grades 1-3 and 4-6 taught by one particular teacher. The school held periodic social events on holidays, leading Kirkland to call it "the center of Pistol River's social life." In 1997 the Pistol River school district merged into the Central Curry school district, and the Pistol River School immediately closed. The Central Curry district later sold the school's land.

== Demographics ==
Historical population
Census	Pop.	Note	%±
2020	89		—
U.S. Decennial Census
