= Lone Ranch Beach =

Beach near Brookings, Oregon

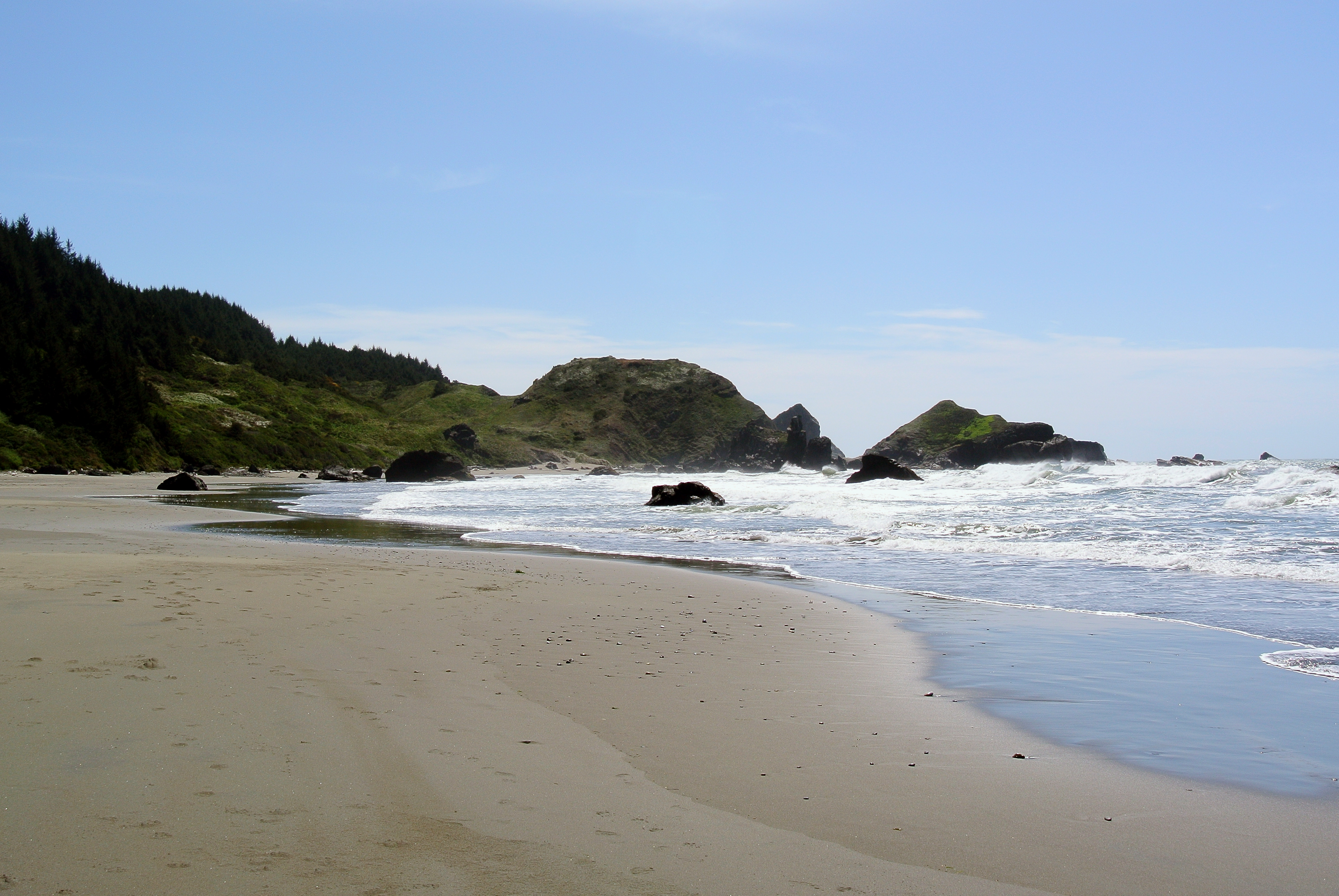
- Lone Ranch Beach seen towards south

- Location within Oregon Location within the United States
- Type: Public, state
- Location: Curry County, Oregon
- Nearest city: Brookings
- Coordinates: 42°05′54″N 124°20′34″W
- Operator: Oregon Parks and Recreation Department

Lone Ranch Beach is a beach administered by the Oregon Parks and Recreation Department, as it is part of the Samuel H. Boardman State Scenic Corridor.

The beach is located near Brookings, Oregon, along the U.S. Route 101.

== See also ==
- List of Oregon state parks
