= Moolack Beach =

Beach in the U.S. state of Oregon

Coordinates: 44.6998382°N 124.0653945°W

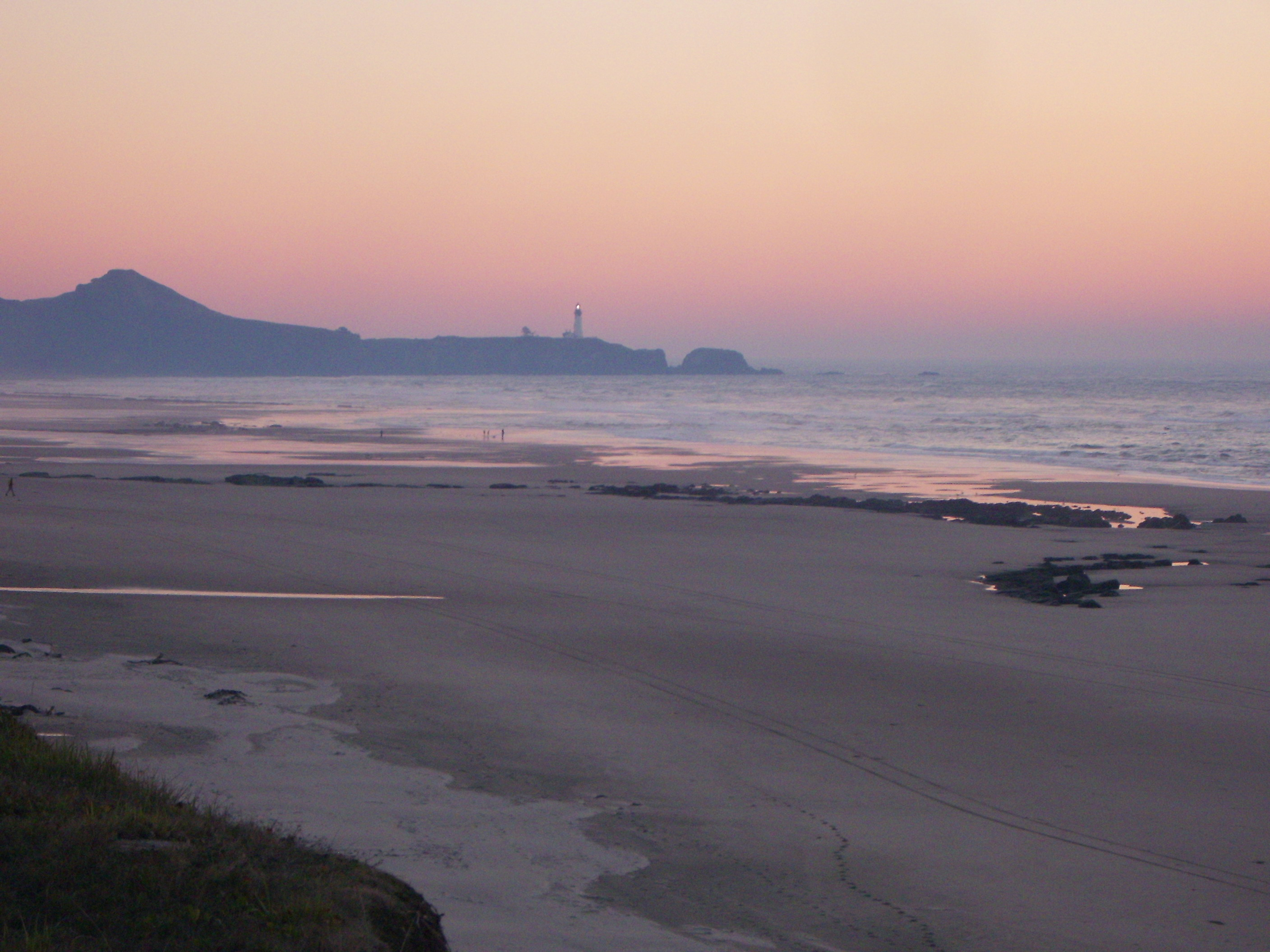
South view. The Yaquina Head Light is visible.

Moolack Beach (also Moolack Shores) is an undeveloped sandy beach on the Oregon Coast about 4 miles (6 km) north of Newport in Lincoln County, United States. It is almost 8 km (5 mi) in length with the south end at Yaquina Head and the north end at Otter Rock, the site of Devils Punch Bowl State Natural Area. The northern beach is the site of Beverly Beach State Park and the community of Beverly Beach. The beach has no obvious break delineating what would seem to be Beverly Beach, though Wade Creek is a likely candidate. The nearly ten-foot (3-metre) tidal range and seasonally varying slope of the beach can cause the sandy beach to completely disappear at times; at other times it can be hundreds of feet wide. The beach is bounded by U.S. Route 101.

The name is from a Chinook Jargon word for "elk". The area is rich with geologic history.

== Geology ==
The rooted stumps that remain likely belonged to trees living approximately 4,500 years ago. Several such stumps are visible at Moolack Beach. Among petrified woods common at Moolack Beach is Teredo wood, which is named for the signature Teredo clam-bored holes. Other petrified woods include pines and hardwoods, including alder, myrtlewood, and oak, as well as petrified palm.

== Climate ==
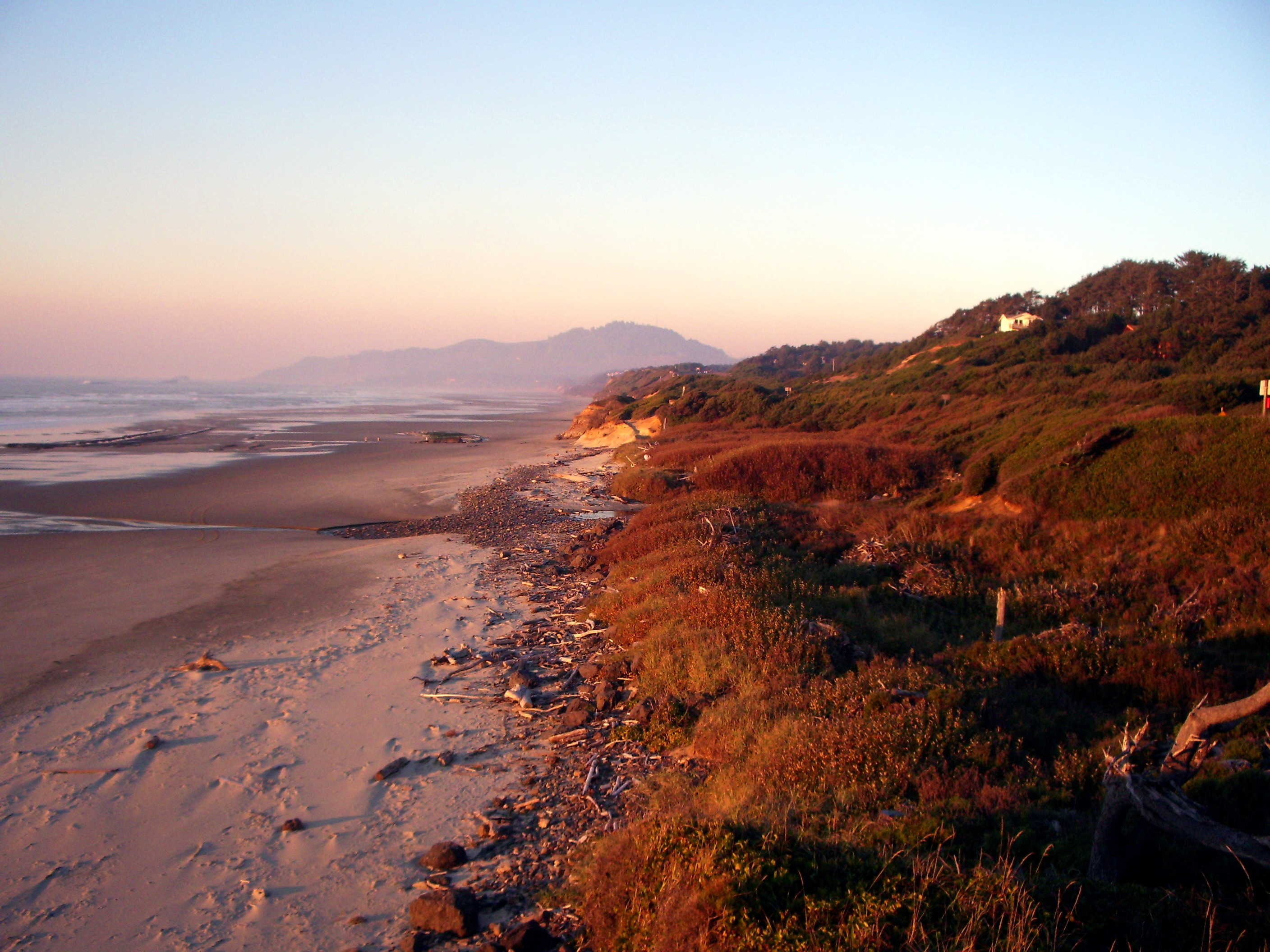
Moolack Beach looking northward at sunset

Moolack Beach reaches high temperatures in the 60s in the summer months and nights in the 40s (5–20 °C). During winter, temperatures usually range from the 50s down to the 30s (0–15 °C). December experiences the greatest amount of Moolack's significant precipitation, while July is driest.

== See also ==
- Oregon Coast Aquarium
- Yaquina Head
- Yaquina Bay Light
