= Manhattan Beach State Recreation Site =

State park in Oregon, USA

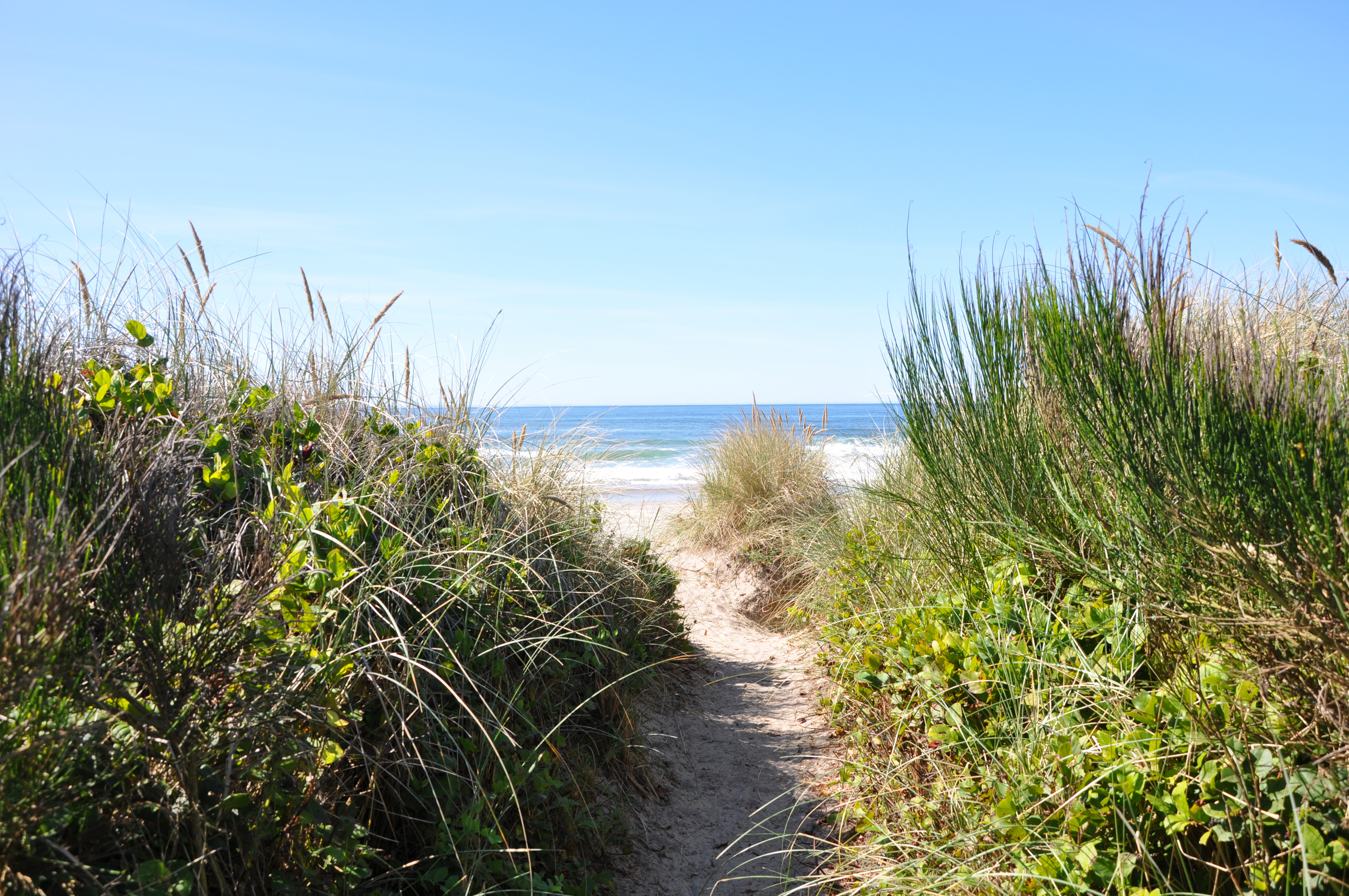
- Path to the beach

- Location within Oregon Location within the United States
- Type: Public, state
- Location: Tillamook County, Oregon
- Nearest city: Rockaway Beach
- Coordinates: 45°38′34″N 123°56′29″W
- Area: 41 acres (17 ha)
- Operator: Oregon Parks and Recreation Department
- Status: Day use, year-round

Manhattan Beach State Recreation Site is a state park in the U.S. state of Oregon. Administered by the Oregon Parks and Recreation Department, the park is open to the public and is fee-free. Amenities at the park, which is 2 miles (3 km) north of Rockaway Beach along U.S. Route 101, include picnicking, fishing, and a Pacific Ocean beach.

The entrance road from the highway leads across tracks of the Southern Pacific Railroad to a site with coastal vegetation, picnic tables, and restrooms. Although the park occupies only 41 acres (17 ha), its beach forms part of a 7-mile (11 km) stretch of public beaches between Tillamook Bay on the south and Nehalem Bay on the north. Sea stacks called the Twin Rocks can be seen offshore to the south near the community of Twin Rocks. The Oregon Coast Trail passes through the park.

Oregon Geographic Names (OGN) says that the name Manhattan Beach "strongly savors of real-estate activity". The Pacific Railway & Navigation Company, which opened a rail line through a nearby summer resort in 1912, named its train station "Manhattan Beach". The unincorporated community of Manhattan Beach had a post office between 1914 and 1975. In 1926, the postmaster wrote that promoters chose the name because Manhattan Beach, Oregon, was a watering place. OGN says the name might be "particularly inappropriate" considering that a native American word for Manhattan Island in New York probably meant "place of drunkenness" and that "no one gets drunk in Oregon, certainly not in watering places. No indeed."

== See also ==
- List of Oregon state parks
