= Lighthouse Beach (Oregon) =

Beach in Oregon, United States

Coordinates: 43.3389997°N 124.3665070°W

Lighthouse Beach is a beach in Coos County, Oregon, United States. It is located between Yoakam Point State Natural Site to the north and Cape Arago Lighthouse to the south, in the unincorporated community of Charleston.
