= Gold Beach, Oregon =

- City
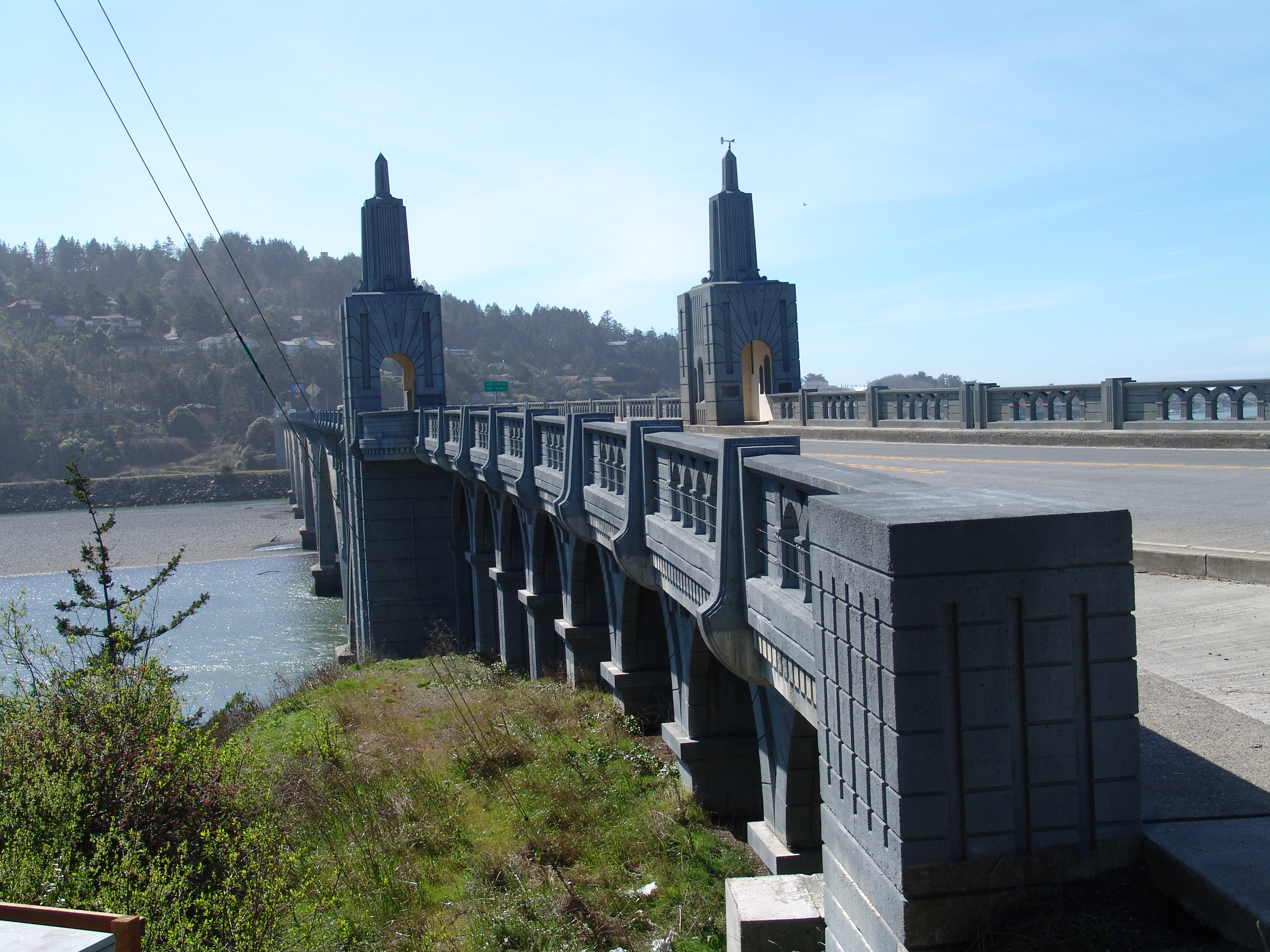
- Isaac Lee Patterson Bridge over Rogue River in Gold Beach

- Location in Oregon
- Coordinates: 42°22′32″N 124°24′42″W
- Country: United States
- State: Oregon
- County: Curry
- Incorporated: 1853

Area
  - Total: 2.77 sq mi (7.17 km^{2})
  - Land: 2.53 sq mi (6.56 km^{2})
  - Water: 0.23 sq mi (0.60 km^{2})
- Elevation: 23 ft (7.0 m)

Population (2020)
  - Total: 2,341
  - Density: 924.0/sq mi (356.76/km^{2})
- Time zone: UTC-8 (Pacific)
  - Summer (DST): UTC-7 (Pacific)
- ZIP code: 97444
- Area code: 541
- FIPS code: 41-29900
- GNIS feature ID: 2410609
- Website: Gold Beach, Oregon

Gold Beach (Tolowa: yan-shu’-chit, yan-shuu-chit’-dvn) is a city in and the county seat of Curry County, Oregon, United States, on the Oregon Coast. The population was 2,241 at the 2020 census.

== History ==
The early narrative of Gold Beach represents an intricate tapestry encompassing Native American civilizations and conflicts, Spanish explorers and European fur traders, ranchers, gold prospectors, loggers, fishermen, mill operatives, and townspeople.

The community was originally named Ellensburg in the 1850s, but later took the name Gold Beach after a beach near the mouth of the Rogue River where hundreds of placer mines extracted gold. An Ellensburg post office was established in 1853, changed to Ellensburg in 1877, and changed to Gold Beach in 1890.

Mailboats based in Gold Beach have been delivering mail upstream to Agness since 1895, one of only two rural mailboat routes remaining in the U.S.

Although Gold Beach had been a community since the middle of the 19th century, and the county seat since 1859, its current incorporation charter only dates to 1945.

== Geography ==
According to the United States Census Bureau, the city has a total area of 2.76 square miles (7.15 km^{2}), of which 2.53 square miles (6.55 km^{2}) is land and 0.23 square miles (0.60 km^{2}) is water.

Gold Beach is bordered to the north by the Rogue River and Barley Beach, also known as Bailey Beach.

=== Climate ===
Gold Beach has cool, very wet winters and mild, relatively dry summers. The location is heavily influenced by the moderating waters of the Pacific and the cool offshore currents. As a result, the temperature swings are very narrow for a climate of its latitude. According to the Köppen climate classification system, Gold Beach has a warm-summer Mediterranean climate (Csb). Between 1948 and 2014, the average maximum temperature in January was about 54 °F or 12.2 °C, and the average minimum was about 41 °F or 5 °C. The corresponding averages for July were 68 °F or 20 °C and 51 °F or 10.6 °C. Annually, there are high temperatures of 90 °F or 32.2 °C on an average of only 0.1 days and there are low temperatures of 32 °F or 0 °C or lower on an average of 9.2 days. The record high temperature was 102 °F (38.9 °C) on September 10, 1973. The record low temperature was 12 °F (−11.1 °C) on January 21, 1962.

The average annual precipitation between 1948 and 2014 was about 80 inches or 2,030 millimetres, mostly falling between October and April. Measurable precipitation occurs on an average of 132 days. The wettest "rain year" was from July 1973 to June 1974 with 116.23 inches (2,952.2 mm) and the driest from July 1976 to June 1977 with 38.83 inches (986.3 mm). The most precipitation in one month was 34.48 inches (875.8 mm) in November 1973. The most precipitation in 24 hours was 7.94 inches (201.7 mm) on December 3, 1987. Snow is very rare in Gold Beach, averaging only 0.2 inches or 0.0051 meters annually. The most snow in one year was 9.0 inches (0.23 m) in 1972, including 6.5 inches (0.17 m) in January and 2.5 inches (0.063 m) in December.

According to the Trewartha climate classification, it has a subtropical climate and is one of the northernmost North American locations to have one.

Climate data for Gold Beach, Oregon, 1991–2020 normals, extremes 1948–present
Month	Jan	Feb	Mar	Apr	May	Jun	Jul	Aug	Sep	Oct	Nov	Dec	Year
Record high °F (°C)	74 (23)	81 (27)	80 (27)	82 (28)	86 (30)	90 (32)	89 (32)	88 (31)	95 (35)	91 (33)	76 (24)	72 (22)	95 (35)
Mean maximum °F (°C)	64.3 (17.9)	66.3 (19.1)	66.6 (19.2)	69.4 (20.8)	73.3 (22.9)	76.1 (24.5)	78.3 (25.7)	78.5 (25.8)	81.3 (27.4)	77.4 (25.2)	67.1 (19.5)	63.2 (17.3)	84.6 (29.2)
Mean daily maximum °F (°C)	54.7 (12.6)	55.4 (13.0)	56.7 (13.7)	58.6 (14.8)	62.3 (16.8)	65.4 (18.6)	68.1 (20.1)	68.6 (20.3)	68.8 (20.4)	64.1 (17.8)	57.2 (14.0)	54.0 (12.2)	61.2 (16.2)
Daily mean °F (°C)	48.7 (9.3)	48.9 (9.4)	49.7 (9.8)	51.4 (10.8)	54.8 (12.7)	57.7 (14.3)	60.6 (15.9)	60.9 (16.1)	60.3 (15.7)	56.4 (13.6)	50.9 (10.5)	47.9 (8.8)	54.0 (12.2)
Mean daily minimum °F (°C)	42.7 (5.9)	42.3 (5.7)	42.7 (5.9)	44.2 (6.8)	47.2 (8.4)	50.1 (10.1)	53.0 (11.7)	53.2 (11.8)	51.7 (10.9)	48.8 (9.3)	44.6 (7.0)	41.7 (5.4)	46.9 (8.3)
Mean minimum °F (°C)	33.2 (0.7)	32.9 (0.5)	34.2 (1.2)	36.2 (2.3)	40.5 (4.7)	44.0 (6.7)	47.8 (8.8)	47.3 (8.5)	44.7 (7.1)	40.2 (4.6)	34.8 (1.6)	32.7 (0.4)	29.1 (−1.6)
Record low °F (°C)	12 (−11)	21 (−6)	26 (−3)	28 (−2)	31 (−1)	35 (2)	36 (2)	34 (1)	37 (3)	31 (−1)	25 (−4)	16 (−9)	12 (−11)
Average precipitation inches (mm)	11.97 (304)	9.68 (246)	10.31 (262)	7.09 (180)	3.45 (88)	1.76 (45)	0.27 (6.9)	0.46 (12)	1.41 (36)	4.91 (125)	10.69 (272)	13.18 (335)	75.18 (1,910)
Average precipitation days	18.3	17.2	18.8	15.5	10.5	5.9	2.3	2.8	4.8	12.1	18.6	18.6	145.4
Source 1: NOAA
Source 2: NOAA NCEI

== Demographics ==
Historical population
Census	Pop.	Note	%±
1890	200		—
1900	112		−44.0%
1910	125		11.6%
1920	321		156.8%
1930	500		55.8%
1940	500		0.0%
1950	677		35.4%
1960	1,765		160.7%
1970	1,554		−12.0%
1980	1,515		−2.5%
1990	1,546		2.0%
2000	1,897		22.7%
2010	2,253		18.8%
2020	2,341		3.9%

=== 2020 census ===
As of the 2020 census, Gold Beach had a population of 2,341. The median age was 53.1 years. 15.0% of residents were under the age of 18 and 27.1% of residents were 65 years of age or older. For every 100 females there were 92.7 males, and for every 100 females age 18 and over there were 92.1 males age 18 and over.

0% of residents lived in urban areas, while 100.0% lived in rural areas.

There were 1,088 households in Gold Beach, of which 20.1% had children under the age of 18 living in them. Of all households, 42.4% were married-couple households, 22.2% were households with a male householder and no spouse or partner present, and 28.2% were households with a female householder and no spouse or partner present. About 35.4% of all households were made up of individuals and 18.7% had someone living alone who was 65 years of age or older.

There were 1,304 housing units, of which 16.6% were vacant. Among occupied housing units, 58.5% were owner-occupied and 41.5% were renter-occupied. The homeowner vacancy rate was 2.0% and the rental vacancy rate was 5.5%.

Racial composition as of the 2020 census
Race	Number	Percent
White	2,013	86.0%
Black or African American	8	0.3%
American Indian and Alaska Native	61	2.6%
Asian	23	1.0%
Native Hawaiian and Other Pacific Islander	6	0.3%
Some other race	27	1.2%
Two or more races	203	8.7%
Hispanic or Latino (of any race)	146	6.2%

=== 2010 census ===
As of the census of 2010, there were 2,253 people, 1,070 households, and 614 families residing in the city. The population density was 890.5 inhabitants per square mile (343.8/km^{2}). There were 1,322 housing units at an average density of 522.5 per square mile (201.7/km^{2}). The racial makeup of the city was 91.5% White, 0.3% African American, 2.0% Native American, 0.8% Asian, 0.6% from other races, and 4.7% from two or more races. Hispanic or Latino of any race were 4.9% of the population.

There were 1,070 households, of which 19.8% had children under the age of 18 living with them, 43.2% were married couples living together, 10.0% had a female householder with no husband present, 4.2% had a male householder with no wife present, and 42.6% were non-families. 37.8% of all households were made up of individuals, and 16.1% had someone living alone who was 65 years of age or older. The average household size was 2.05 and the average family size was 2.60.

The median age in the city was 50.6 years. 16.5% of residents were under the age of 18; 5.8% were between the ages of 18 and 24; 18.4% were from 25 to 44; 36.5% were from 45 to 64; and 22.7% were 65 years of age or older. The gender makeup of the city was 48.5% male and 51.5% female.

=== 2000 census ===
As of the census of 2000, there were 1,897 people, 829 households, and 509 families residing in the city. The population density was 813.7 inhabitants per square mile (314.2/km^{2}). There were 987 housing units at an average density of 423.4 per square mile (163.5/km^{2}). The racial makeup of the city was 93.09% White, 0.26% African American, 2.21% Native American, 0.90% Asian, 0.05% Pacific Islander, 1.16% from other races, and 2.32% from two or more races. Hispanic or Latino of any race were 2.69% of the population.

There were 829 households, out of which 24.4% had children under the age of 18 living with them, 48.7% were married couples living together, 10.3% had a female householder with no husband present, and 38.5% were non-families. 33.2% of all households were made up of individuals, and 14.7% had someone living alone who was 65 years of age or older. The average household size was 2.19 and the average family size was 2.75.

In the city, the population was spread out, with 21.0% under the age of 18, 6.2% from 18 to 24, 23.4% from 25 to 44, 30.5% from 45 to 64, and 19.0% who were 65 years of age or older. The median age was 45 years. For every 100 females, there were 92.4 males. For every 100 females age 18 and over, there were 91.2 males.

The median income for a household in the city was $30,243, and the median income for a family was $37,634. Males had a median income of $31,083 versus $23,512 for females. The per capita income for the city was $16,717. About 8.8% of families and 12.4% of the population were below the poverty line, including 12.8% of those under age 18 and 6.9% of those age 65 or over.

== Education ==
Gold Beach is served by the Central Curry School District. The schools, Riley Creek School and Gold Beach High School, are located in Gold Beach.

The entire county is in the Southwestern Oregon Community College district.

== Notable people ==
- Gregory Harrison — actor; was a resident of Gold Beach for 15 years.
- Travis Rush — country singer; grew up in Gold Beach.
- Bridgette Wilson — actress, Miss Oregon Teen USA 1990, Miss Teen USA 1990

== Transportation ==
- Gold Beach Municipal Airport

== Media ==
=== Newspapers ===
The Curry County Reporter is the region's newspaper, established in 1914.

=== Radio ===
- KGBR 92.7 FM - Classic Hits

== See also ==
- Steamboats of the Oregon Coast
