= Curry County, Oregon =

County in Oregon, United States

- County
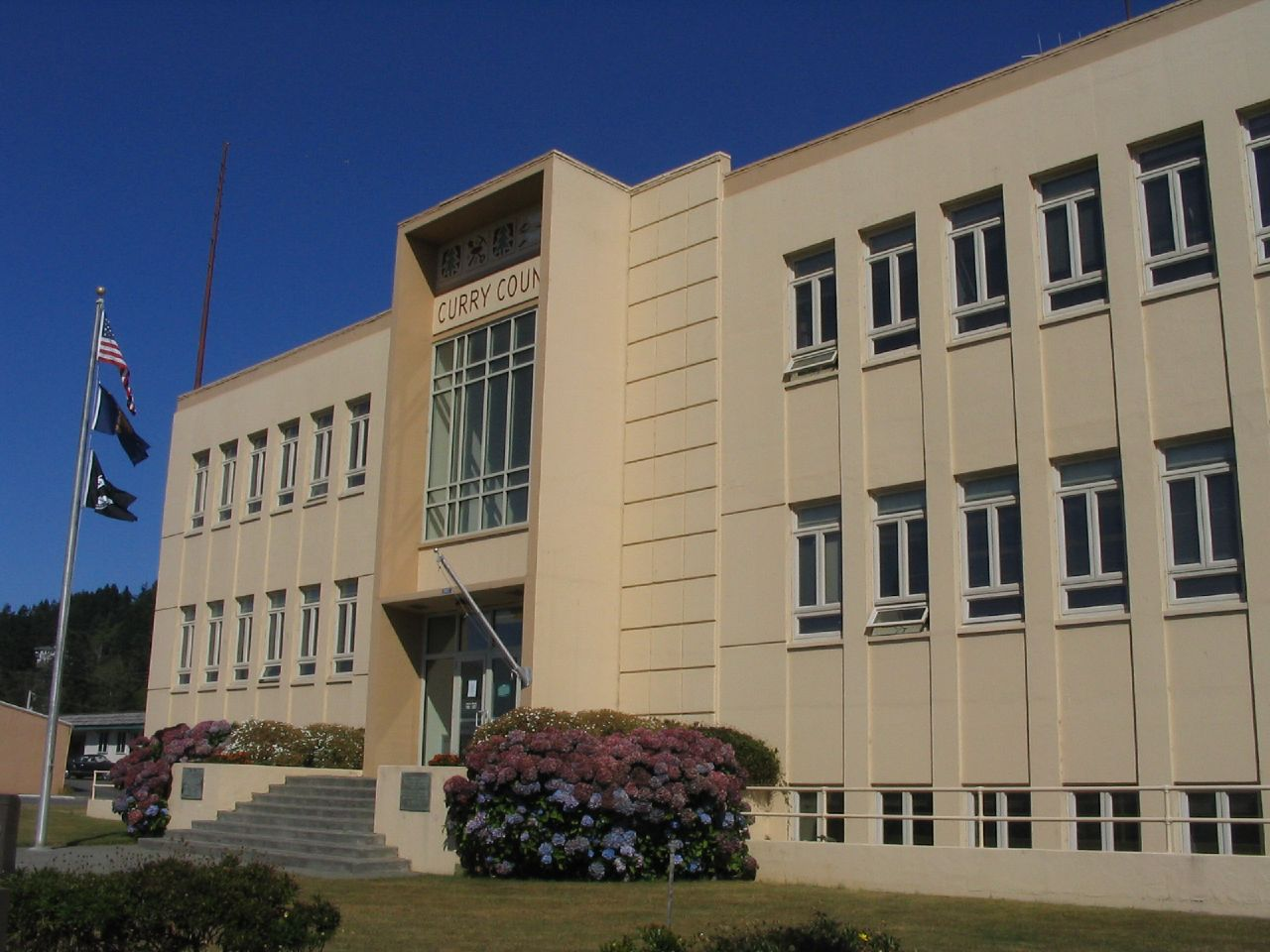
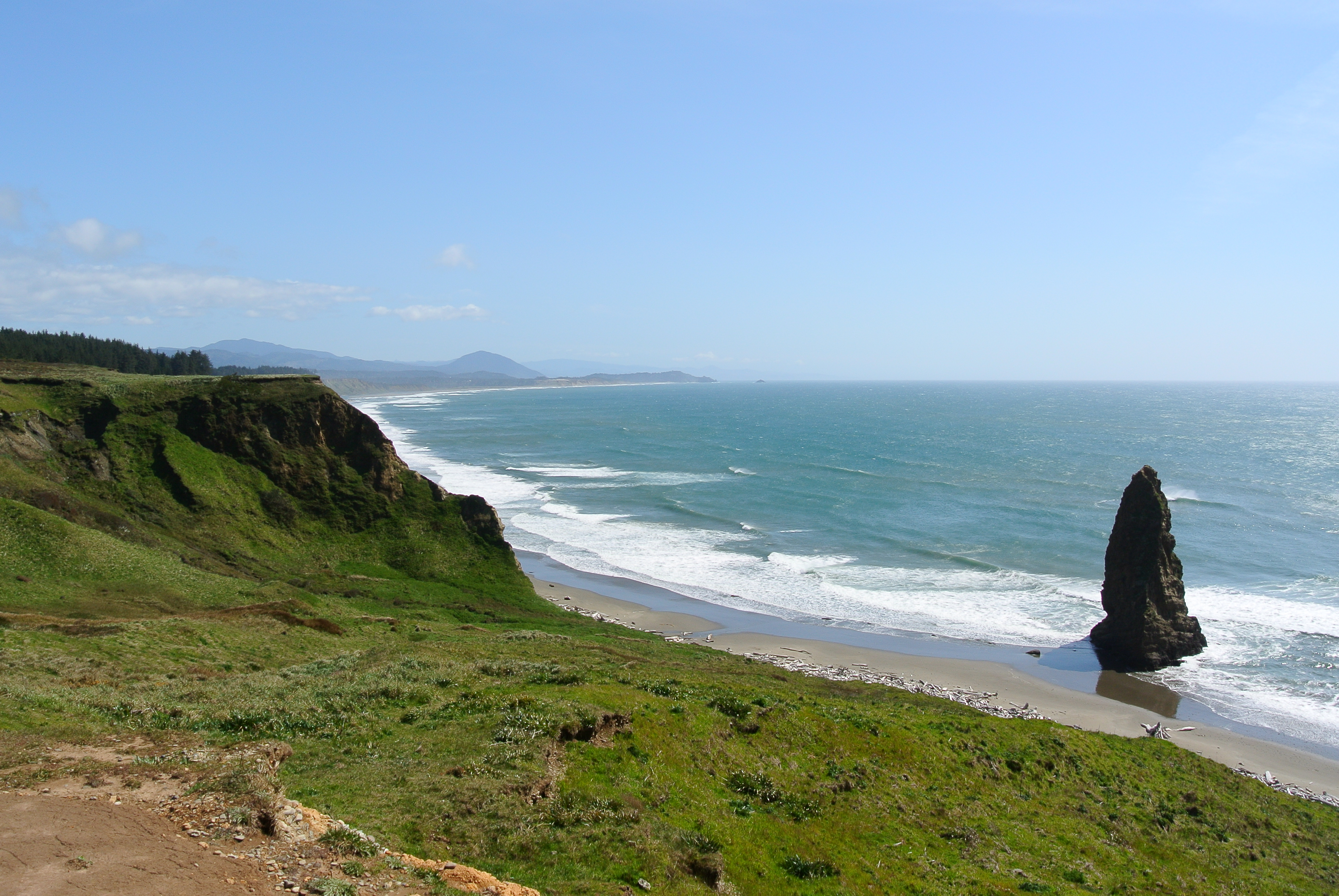
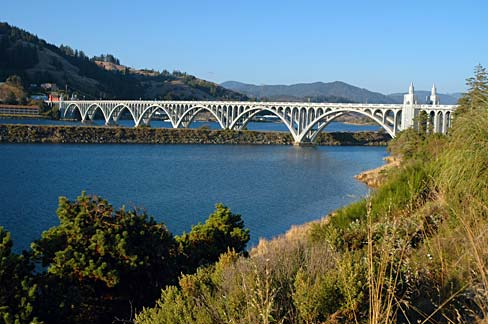
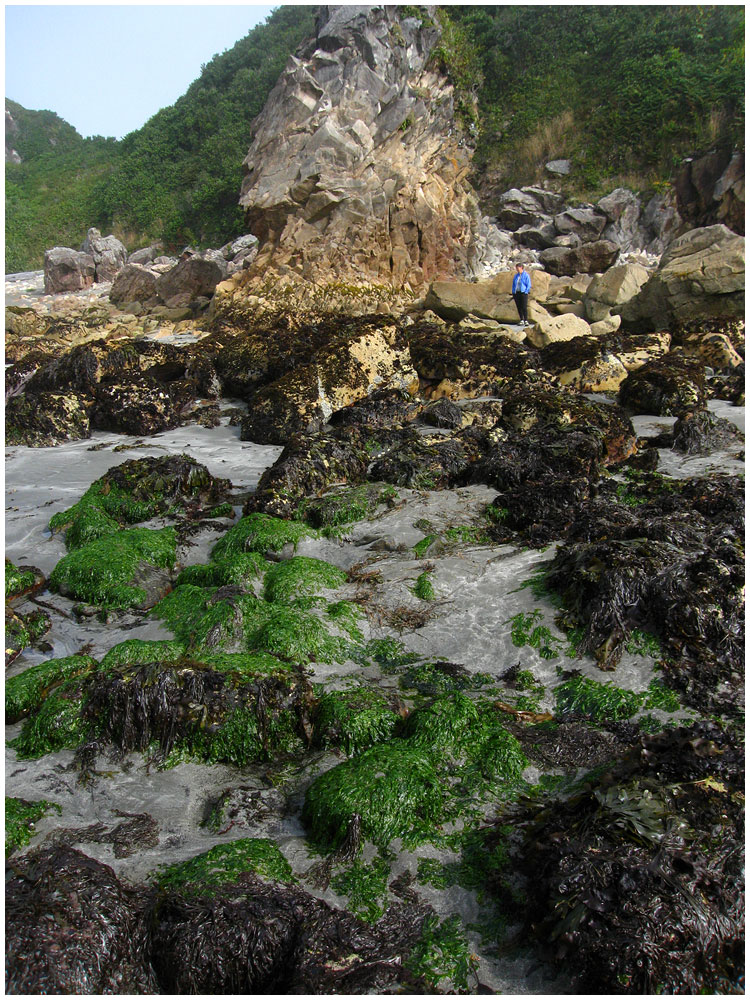
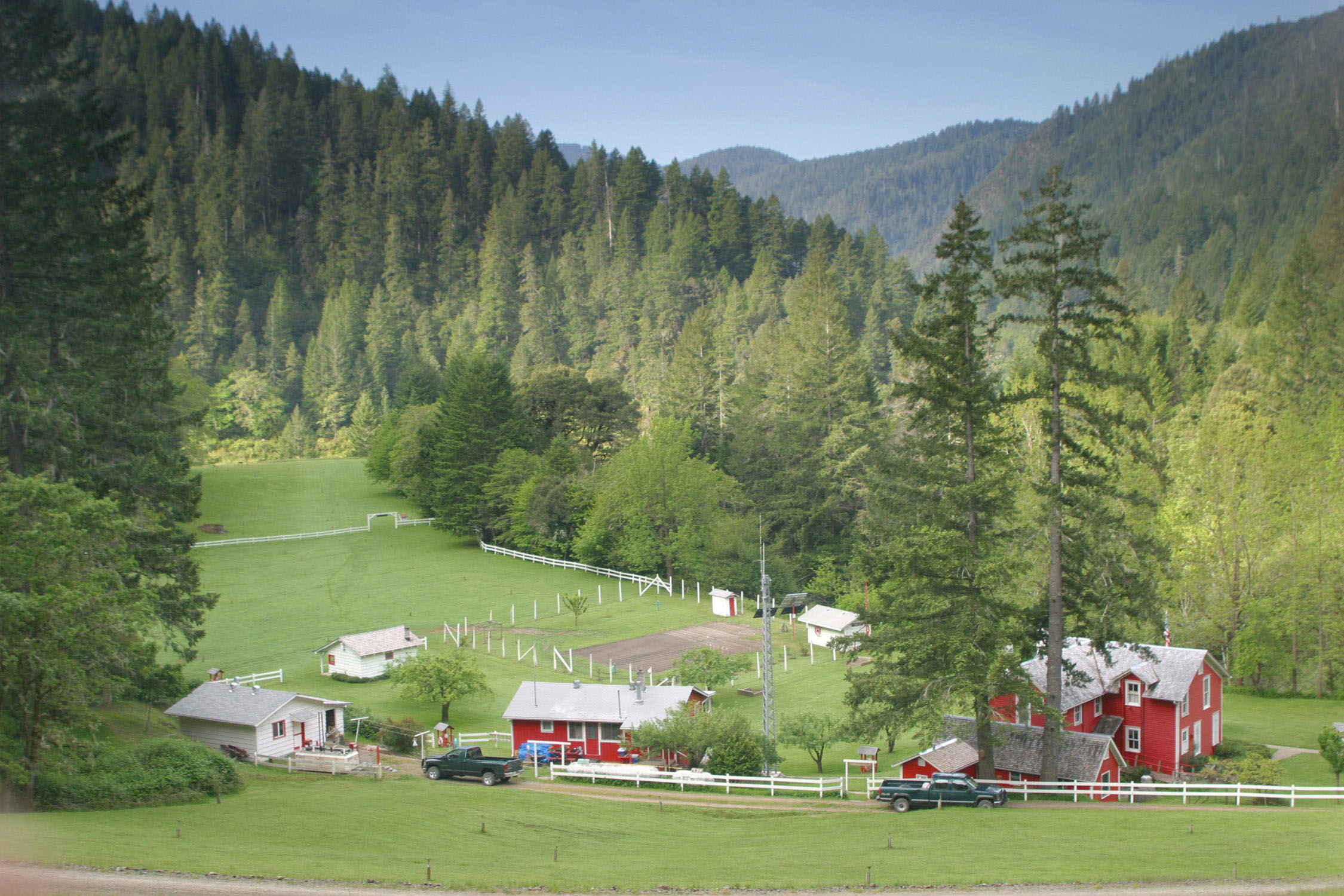
- From clockwise: Curry County Courthouse, Patterson Memorial Bridge over the Rogue River in Gold Beach, Cape Blanco, Harris Beach State Park, Rogue River Ranch

- Location within the U.S. state of Oregon
- Coordinates: 42°28′48″N 124°08′12″W
- Country: United States
- State: Oregon
- Founded: December 18, 1855
- Named for: George L. Curry
- Seat: Gold Beach
- Largest city: Brookings

Area
  - Total: 1,988 sq mi (5,150 km^{2})
  - Land: 1,627 sq mi (4,210 km^{2})
  - Water: 361 sq mi (930 km^{2}) 18.2%

Population (2020)
  - Total: 23,446
  - Estimate (2025): 22,621 ▼
  - Density: 14.41/sq mi (5.564/km^{2})
- Time zone: UTC−8 (Pacific)
  - Summer (DST): UTC−7 (PDT)
- Congressional district: 4th
- Website: www.currycountyor.gov

Curry County is the southwesternmost county in the U.S. state of Oregon located on the South Coast. As of the 2020 census, the population was 23,446. The county seat is Gold Beach. The county is named for George Law Curry, a two-time governor of the Oregon Territory. Curry County includes the Brookings, OR Micropolitan Statistical Area.

== Geography ==
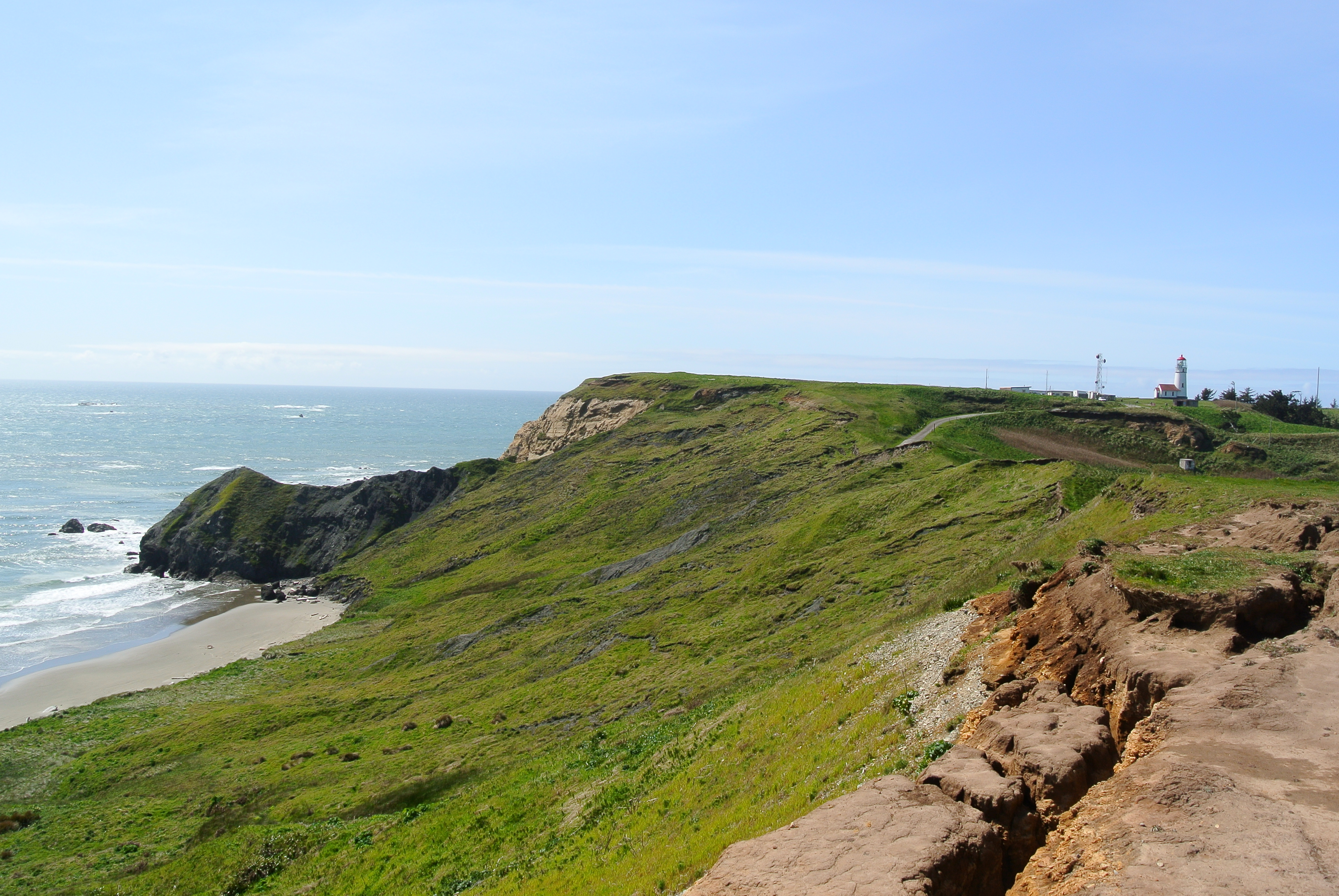
Cape Blanco

According to the United States Census Bureau, the county has a total area of 1,988 square miles (5,150 km^{2}), of which 1,627 square miles (4,210 km^{2}) is land and 361 square miles (930 km^{2}), comprising 18%, is water.

The westernmost point in Oregon is in Curry County at Cape Blanco located at 42.835508°N 124.565939°W.

The county contains significant forests, with the occurrence of black oak, big leaf maple and Douglas fir. The blue oak, prevalent slightly further south, does not reach into Curry County.

=== Adjacent counties ===
- Coos County (north)
- Douglas County (northeast)
- Josephine County (east)
- Del Norte County, California (south)

=== National protected areas ===
- Oregon Islands National Wildlife Refuge
- Siskiyou National Forest (part)

== Demographics ==
Historical population
Census	Pop.	Note	%±
1860	393		—
1870	504		28.2%
1880	1,208		139.7%
1890	1,709		41.5%
1900	1,868		9.3%
1910	2,044		9.4%
1920	3,025		48.0%
1930	3,257		7.7%
1940	4,301		32.1%
1950	6,048		40.6%
1960	13,983		131.2%
1970	13,006		−7.0%
1980	16,992		30.6%
1990	19,327		13.7%
2000	21,137		9.4%
2010	22,364		5.8%
2020	23,446		4.8%
2025 (est.)	22,621	▼	−3.5%
U.S. Decennial Census; 1790–1960 1900–1990; 1990–2000 2010–2020

=== 2020 census ===
As of the 2020 census, the county had a population of 23,446. Of the residents, 14.2% were under the age of 18 and 35.5% were 65 years of age or older; the median age was 57.5 years. For every 100 females there were 96.2 males, and for every 100 females age 18 and over there were 94.9 males. 48.2% of residents lived in urban areas and 51.8% lived in rural areas.

Curry County, Oregon – Racial and ethnic composition Note: the US Census treats Hispanic/Latino as an ethnic category. This table excludes Latinos from the racial categories and assigns them to a separate category. Hispanics/Latinos may be of any race.
Race / Ethnicity (NH = Non-Hispanic)	Pop 1980	Pop 1990	Pop 2000	Pop 2010	Pop 2020	% 1980	% 1990	% 2000	% 2010	% 2020
White alone (NH)	16,360	18,367	19,206	19,837	19,428	96.28%	95.03%	90.86%	88.70%	82.86%
Black or African American alone (NH)	13	31	31	62	77	0.08%	0.16%	0.15%	0.28%	0.33%
Native American or Alaska Native alone (NH)	332	444	408	391	461	1.95%	2.30%	1.93%	1.75%	1.97%
Asian alone (NH)	51	121	144	157	214	0.30%	0.63%	0.68%	0.70%	0.91%
Native Hawaiian or Pacific Islander alone (NH)	x	x	21	21	25	x	x	0.10%	0.09%	0.11%
Other race alone (NH)	11	10	29	16	125	0.06%	0.05%	0.14%	0.07%	0.53%
Mixed race or Multiracial (NH)	x	x	537	679	1,442	x	x	2.54%	3.04%	6.15%
Hispanic or Latino (any race)	225	354	761	1,201	1,674	1.32%	1.83%	3.60%	5.37%	7.14%
Total	16,992	19,327	21,137	22,364	23,446	100.00%	100.00%	100.00%	100.00%	100.00%

=== American Community Survey 2025 data ===
The United States Census Bureau estimated that in 2025, Curry County’s population was 22.621. It was also estimated that the county's population was 82,01% Non-Hispanic White, 8,71% Hispanic or Latino, 0,55% Non-Hispanic Black, 1,24% Asian, 2,01% Native American, 0,20% Pacific Islander, and 5,28% Multiracial.

Total	Population	Percentage
Non-Hispanic White	18.552	82,01%
Hispanic or Latino	1.971	8,71%
Non-Hispanic Black	124	0,55%
Asian	280	1,24%
Native American	455	2,01%
Pacific Islander	45	0,20%
Non-Hispanic Multiracial	1.194	5,28%

The racial makeup of the county was 85.0% White, 0.4% Black or African American, 2.3% American Indian and Alaska Native, 0.9% Asian, 0.1% Native Hawaiian and Pacific Islander, 2.3% from some other race, and 9.0% from two or more races. Hispanic or Latino residents of any race comprised 7.1% of the population.

There were 10,953 households in the county, of which 17.6% had children under the age of 18 living with them and 26.7% had a female householder with no spouse or partner present. About 33.3% of all households were made up of individuals and 20.4% had someone living alone who was 65 years of age or older.

There were 13,018 housing units, of which 15.9% were vacant. Among occupied housing units, 70.0% were owner-occupied and 30.0% were renter-occupied. The homeowner vacancy rate was 1.9% and the rental vacancy rate was 6.3%.

=== 2010 census ===
As of the 2010 census, there were 22,364 people, 10,417 households, and 6,347 families living in the county. The population density was 13.7 inhabitants per square mile (5.3 inhabitants/km^{2}). There were 12,613 housing units at an average density of 7.8 units per square mile (3.0 units/km^{2}). The racial makeup of the county was 92.0% white, 1.9% American Indian, 0.7% Asian, 0.3% black or African American, 0.1% Pacific islander, 1.3% from other races, and 3.7% from two or more races. Those of Hispanic or Latino origin made up 5.4% of the population. In terms of ancestry, 26.3% were German, 16.2% were English, 14.1% were Irish, 6.2% were American, and 5.2% were Swedish.

Of the 10,417 households, 18.9% had children under the age of 18 living with them, 48.6% were married couples living together, 8.4% had a female householder with no husband present, 39.1% were non-families, and 32.4% of all households were made up of individuals. The average household size was 2.12 and the average family size was 2.62. The median age was 53.5 years.

The median income for a household in the county was $37,469 and the median income for a family was $53,340. Males had a median income of $41,667 versus $27,188 for females. The per capita income for the county was $23,842. About 9.2% of families and 13.9% of the population were below the poverty line, including 19.0% of those under age 18 and 8.0% of those age 65 or over.

=== 2000 census ===
As of the 2000 census, there were 21,137 people, 9,543 households, and 6,183 families living in the county. The population density was 13 people per square mile (5.0 people/km^{2}). There were 11,406 housing units at an average density of 7 units per square mile (2.7/km^{2}). The racial makeup of the county was 92.89% White, 0.15% Black or African American, 2.14% Native American, 0.70% Asian, 0.11% Pacific Islander, 1.11% from other races, and 2.90% from two or more races. 3.60% of the population were Hispanic or Latino of any race. 20.1% were of German, 13.8% English, 10.3% United States or American and 9.9% Irish ancestry. 95.9% spoke English and 2.5% Spanish as their first language.

There were 9,543 households, out of which 20.90% had children under the age of 18 living with them, 54.50% were married couples living together, 7.20% had a female householder with no husband present, and 35.20% were non-families. 29.70% of all households were made up of individuals, and 14.70% had someone living alone who was 65 years of age or older. The average household size was 2.19 and the average family size was 2.66.

In the county, the population was spread out, with 19.20% under the age of 18, 4.80% from 18 to 24, 20.00% from 25 to 44, 29.40% from 45 to 64, and 26.60% who were 65 years of age or older. The median age was 49 years. For every 100 females there were 96.60 males. For every 100 females age 18 and over, there were 94.80 males.

The median income for a household in the county was $30,117, and the median income for a family was $35,627. Males had a median income of $31,772 versus $22,416 for females. The per capita income for the county was $18,138. About 9.70% of families and 12.20% of the population were below the poverty line, including 13.60% of those under age 18 and 10.60% of those age 65 or over.

== Communities ==
=== Cities ===
- Brookings
- Gold Beach (county seat)
- Port Orford

=== Census-designated places ===
- Harbor
- Langlois
- Nesika Beach
- Pistol River
- Wedderburn

=== Unincorporated communities ===
- Agness
- Bagnell Ferry
- Carpenterville
- Denmark
- Hunter Creek
- Illahe
- Marial
- Ophir
- Plum Trees
- Sixes

== Politics ==
Curry County, like most of southwestern Oregon, is a Republican-led county, although in part due to a more liberal lean in the city of Port Orford, it does not give so small a proportion of its vote to Democrats as Eastern Oregon does. No Democratic presidential candidate has obtained an absolute majority in Curry County since Lyndon Johnson's 1964 landslide, and the county has been carried by Democrats for Presidents twice since, with only one occurrence being after the "Reagan Revolution". This occurred when Bill Clinton obtained a 32-vote plurality over George H. W. Bush in a three-way contest with billionaire businessman Ross Perot in 1992. Even so, the Republican lean in Curry County has shown a few signs of waning in recent years. In four of the last six presidential elections, Democrats were able to exceed 40 percent of the county's votes.

In the United States House of Representatives, Curry County is located in Oregon's 4th congressional district, which also includes the more left-leaning Eugene metropolitan area and is currently represented by Democrat Val Hoyle, serving since January 2023. In the Oregon State Senate, Curry County is located in the 1st Senate District, represented by Republican David Brock Smith. In the Oregon House of Representatives, it is located in the 1st District, represented by Republican and former Curry County Commissioner Court Boice.

United States presidential election results for Curry County, Oregon
Year	Republican		Democratic		Third party(ies)	
Year	No.	%	No.	%	No.	%
1904	322	70.77%	87	19.12%	46	10.11%
1908	268	58.64%	148	32.39%	41	8.97%
1912	102	16.83%	219	36.14%	285	47.03%
1916	541	45.62%	512	43.17%	133	11.21%
1920	599	60.87%	280	28.46%	105	10.67%
1924	664	54.70%	224	18.45%	326	26.85%
1928	694	59.16%	453	38.62%	26	2.22%
1932	395	27.66%	971	68.00%	62	4.34%
1936	497	29.58%	913	54.35%	270	16.07%
1940	941	47.26%	1,033	51.88%	17	0.85%
1944	827	54.16%	678	44.40%	22	1.44%
1948	1,112	59.18%	677	36.03%	90	4.79%
1952	2,147	67.54%	1,005	31.61%	27	0.85%
1956	2,306	53.60%	1,996	46.40%	0	0.00%
1960	2,382	46.23%	2,767	53.70%	4	0.08%
1964	1,467	31.31%	3,195	68.18%	24	0.51%
1968	2,323	49.12%	1,934	40.90%	472	9.98%
1972	2,832	51.77%	2,108	38.54%	530	9.69%
1976	2,962	45.52%	3,227	49.59%	318	4.89%
1980	4,910	57.85%	2,656	31.29%	922	10.86%
1984	5,363	60.84%	3,423	38.83%	29	0.33%
1988	4,761	52.83%	4,015	44.55%	236	2.62%
1992	3,809	34.47%	3,841	34.76%	3,400	30.77%
1996	4,790	43.66%	4,202	38.30%	1,980	18.05%
2000	6,551	56.90%	4,090	35.53%	872	7.57%
2004	7,332	57.29%	5,220	40.78%	247	1.93%
2008	6,646	53.89%	5,230	42.41%	456	3.70%
2012	6,598	56.50%	4,625	39.60%	455	3.90%
2016	7,212	57.19%	4,300	34.10%	1,099	8.71%
2020	8,484	56.84%	6,058	40.59%	383	2.57%
2024	8,000	56.34%	5,737	40.40%	463	3.26%

== Economy ==
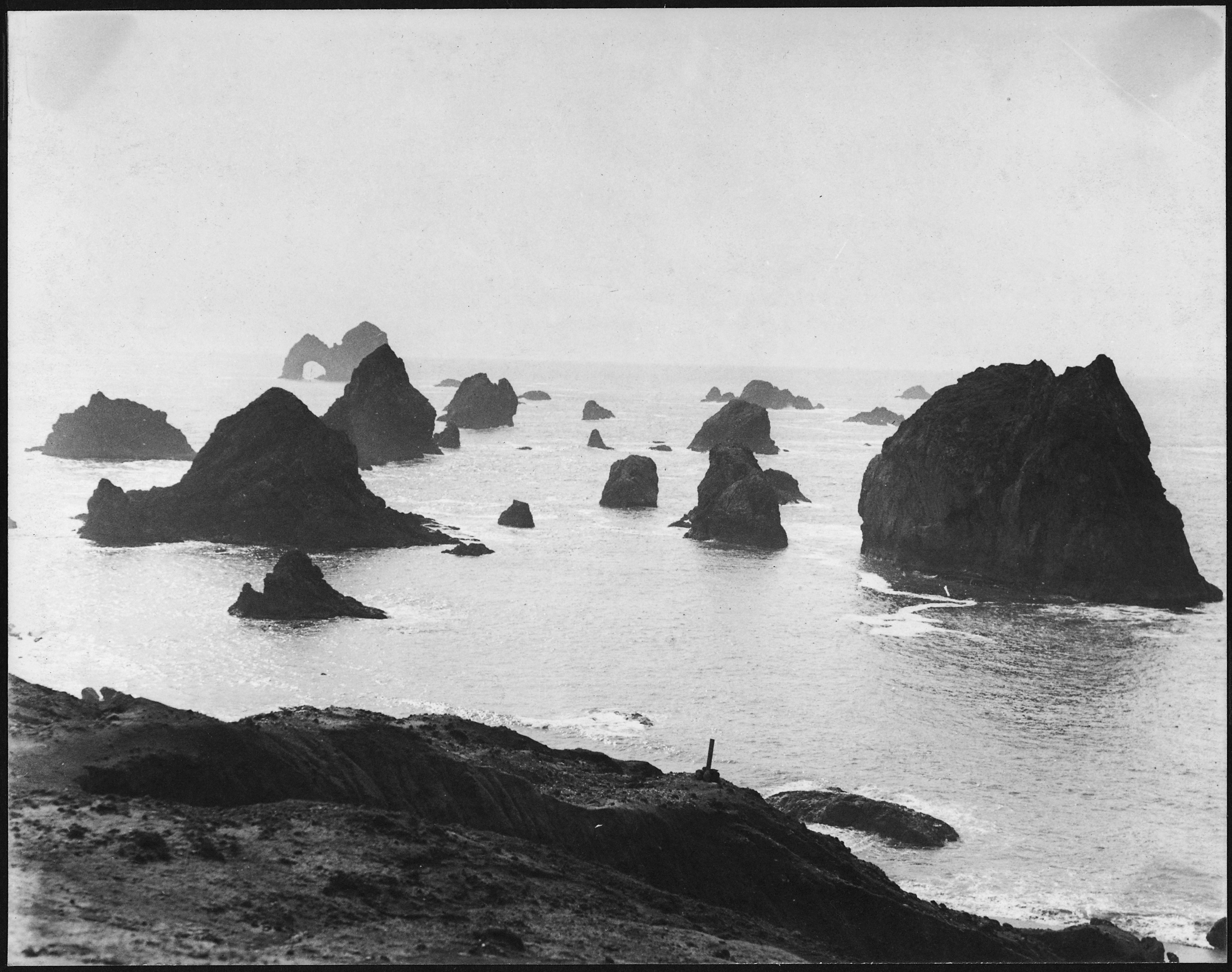
Mack Arch Cove in 1938

After discovery of gold and other precious metals along the beaches and rivers of Curry County in the mid-19th century, white settlements developed along the coast. Traveling mainly by water or by coast-hugging land routes, residents remained relatively isolated from the rest of Oregon until the 20th century. As mining declined in the region, the economy became more dependent on farming, livestock grazing, forest products such as Port Orford cedar (also known as Lawson's cypress) and myrtlewood, and tourism. Blueberries and nursery plants are among the important farm products, and most of the Easter lilies grown in the United States come from Curry County.

In 2001, the native tanoak in the county were afflicted by sudden oak death, caused by infection of Phytophthora ramorum. The pathogen, which by 2016 had killed hundreds of thousands of tanoaks in the county, thrives in moist places along the coast. It has killed other kinds of oaks such as California black oak in a region that includes many California counties as well as Curry County, and it has infected and damaged a variety of conifers and shrubs such as camellia. In Curry County, it threatens timber production, plant nurseries, and Christmas tree farms.

As of 2012, the Federal government owned 66 percent of the land in Curry County, while 22 percent was owned by private forest interests. About 7 percent was being farmed; the state of Oregon owned 1 percent, and 4 percent was devoted to other uses.

The Port of Brookings Harbor, a shallow-draft harbor at the mouth of the Chetco River, is considered one of the safest harbors on the coast. It is listed as a Harbor of Refuge by the United States Coast Guard.

== Media ==
- Curry County Reporter
- Curry Coastal Pilot

== Education ==
School districts include:

- Brookings-Harbor School District 17
- Central Curry School District 1
- Port Orford-Langlois School District 2J

In 1997 the following districts merged into Central Curry: the Agness, Ophir, Pistol River, and Riley Creek elementary districts and the Gold Beach Union High School District.

The entire county is in the Southwestern Oregon Community College district.

== See also ==
- National Register of Historic Places listings in Curry County, Oregon
- Siskiyou National Forest
- USS Curry County (LST-685)
