= Sitka Sedge State Natural Area =

Natural area in Tillamook County, Oregon, United States

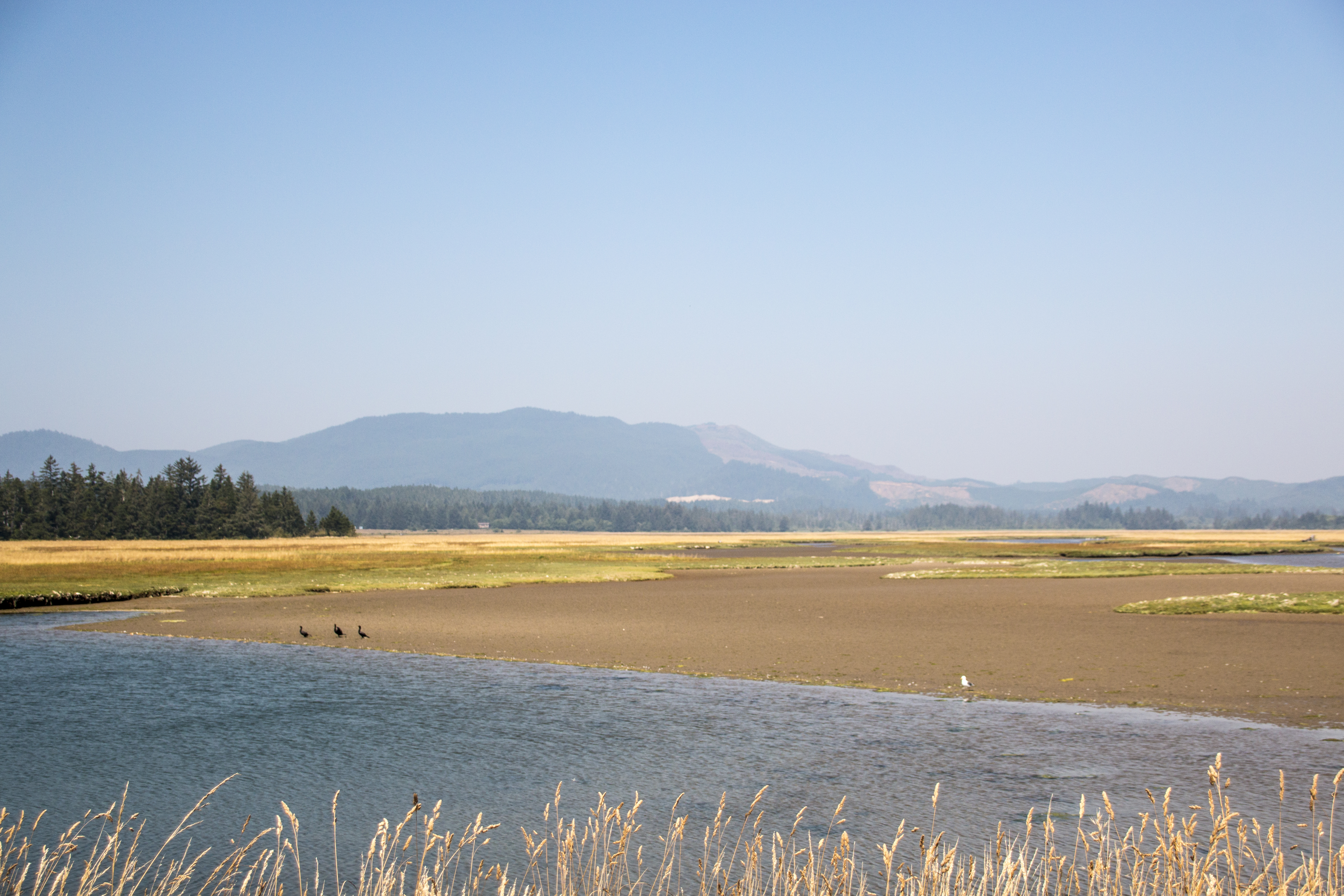
- Sitka Sedge State Natural Area
- Interactive map of Sitka Sedge State Natural Area
- Location: North of Pacific City and south of Tillamook at Tierra Del Mar, Tillamook County, Oregon, U.S.
- Nearest city: Tillamook
- Coordinates: 45°15′46.8″N 123°57′14.1″W
- Area: 357 acres (144 ha)
- Operator: Oregon Parks and Recreation Department

Sitka Sedge State Natural Area (Sitka Sedge) is an estuary and beach on the north coast of the U.S. state of Oregon in Tillamook County. Sitka Sedge consists of 357 acres (144 ha) of tidal marsh, mudflats, dunes, forested wetlands, and uplands at the south end of the Sand Lake estuary, north of Tierra Del Mar.

Land at the southernmost end of the estuary had been diked and farmed for most of the twentieth century, and the area had been proposed for golf course development for more than a decade. Tierra Del Mar residents have acted since 1989 to preserve the site.

In 2014 Oregon Parks and Recreation Department (OPRD) purchased the property formerly known as the Beltz Farm to preserve this natural ecosystem for public education. It is named for the Sitka sedge, Carex aquatilis v. dives, a plant native to the site.

== History ==
The area that is now Sitka Sedge was the traditional territory of the Nestucca group of the Tillamook people. By treaty it was included inside the Siletz Reservation boundaries from 1855 to 1875. According to Oregon State Parks and Recreation, "Confederated Tribes of the Grand Ronde also claim cultural affiliation with the area."

=== Dairy farming ===
In the early part of the twentieth century, Anna Elise Timm Roenicke, who became divorced in 1899, moved her family from Portland to the coastal property and used it for dairy farming. By 1930, the Roenikes had moved to Salem, selling the farm to Naomi and Frederick (F.A. or Fritz) Beltz, who lived in Tillamook and continued to run the dairy farm. During the 1930s, Beltz built two residences, one for their family and a second for the full-time caretaker who managed the farm, as well as a dike and Sand Lake Road. An elected judge of Tillamook County, he also advocated hard-surfacing the "Roosevelt Highway", now Highway 101. According to his granddaughter Peggy Howard,

The family lived in Tillamook but visited the property often. Fritz built a dike along the ocean front to protect his pastures from tidal water. The area where he dug the rock became a trout pond and later swimming hole for his daughters...Fritz died in 1959 and Naomi in 1968.

— Sally Rissel, Pacific City Sun

In the 1940s–1950s, the Fry family farmed the land, and there was a Coast Guard monitoring station there during the 1940s. From 1958 to 1975 the Beachy family farmed there. During the 1960s–1970s, OPRD began exploring state park opportunities for the estuary. The land sold again in 1975 to the Farrell family, who farmed it until 1987. Frank J. and Joyce D. Bastasch then purchased the property.

=== Preservation of Sand Lake estuary and Belz Farm property ===
The Sand Lake estuary has been described as "the last of its kind in Oregon — a fully-functioning, undeveloped tidal and dune ecosystem".

==== Clear-cut proposal; motorized vehicles ====
In 1989, residents of Tierra Del Mar began a two-year process to successfully appeal a U.S. Forest Service decision to clear-cut 30 acres (12 ha) within the Beltz Creek watershed. That same year, they started petitioning the Oregon Transportation Commission to prevent motorized vehicles on the beach. Due to their efforts, in 1995 the Commission permanently closed the beach to vehicles on weekends and holidays to address "safety issues, dune damage, log removal, and wildlife and habitat destruction from automobiles, dirt-bikes, and 3-wheelers".

==== Mine and quarry proposal ====
In 1993, residents persuaded the Tillamook Department of Community Development to deny a conditional use application of Stuwe Land and Timber Company for a mine and aggregate quarry site.

==== Potential mitigation for Sandlake-Gallway road ====
In 1999, the Sand Lake estuary was one of three areas identified as a possible mitigation site for likely impacts to wetlands with improvements to Sandlake-Galloway road. The mitigation recommended for the Sand Lake site was to breach the dike on the Beltz farm property, to allow for tidal flow into Sand Lake's fresh water marsh, to improve its estuarine ecology, and to restore high salt marsh habitat for fish and other animals. However, local residents were concerned that breaching the dike could cause flooding in Tierra Del Mar. The Salmon River was ultimately the site chosen for mitigation.

==== Proposal to restore etuarine function ====
In early 2000, Ducks Unlimited submitted a proposal to Oregon Watershed Enhancement Board that would have restored estuarine function to about 100 acres (40 ha) of diked tidelands at the south end of Sand Lake on the Beltz Farm. The project was placed on hold, however, due to Bastasch's pending sale of the property to golf course developers.

==== Golf course proposals ====
By 2003, the Tierra Del Mar Community Association surveyed its members, finding 72% opposed Frank Bastasch's proposed golf course. Their Board of Directors officially opposed the construction of an 18-hole golf course, and also officially opposed a conditional use application permit that Golf Links, L.C.C., had filed in Tillamook County.

In June 2005, Bastasch discussed potential changes to his golf course proposal with Tillamook County planning officials. Bastasch asked if the county would allow "a hotel, timeshare condos and a restaurant" as well as an 18-hole golf course at the Sand Lake site.

According to a real estate appraisal prepared in 2014, the property had been on the market for more than ten years:

The extended marketing time was primarily due to the prior owner's (Bastasch) reluctance to lower the price to a point where it could attract serious interest from likely buyers, and due to the frustration of the attempts by parties who wished to develop the parcel, but found regulatory obstacles during their due diligence process.

— Matthew Larrabee, Real Estate Appraisal Report

Zach Urness of The Statesman Journal wrote, "Former owners attempted to build a destination style golf course on the land throughout the 2000s, including one proposal that would have required memberships costing $25,000 to $35,000 per person." According to Terry Richard of the Oregonian, Bastasch's proposed sale of the property failed due to "zoning restrictions, land use laws and wetlands". Urness additionally credited decades-long resistance from the adjacent Tierra Del Mar community that prevented golf course proposals multiple times on the estuary and beachfront.

==== Sale to Ecotrust, OPRD ====
In 2014, Ecotrust purchased the property for US$1.8 million, based on value established by Larrabee's Real Estate Appraisal Report. OPRD acquired the area from Ecotrust in June 2014 using Oregon Lottery funds and a National Coastal Wetlands Conservation grant from the U.S. Fish and Wildlife Service.

Urness wrote, "The park, composed of a small parking area and 3 miles (4.8 km) of hiking trails, is the culmination of a decades-long effort to preserve one of the most pristine sections of estuary and oceanfront in Oregon."

=== Beltz dike issues ===
Sometime in the 1930s, Frita Beltz installed a half-mile long dike and a tide gate to hold tidewater back, creating a freshwater marsh when the gate closed, and draining the area behind the dike at low tide. The dike provided pasture land for cattle, and was a road for wagons and tractors. The dike has also impeded movement of native fish (coho, chum, steelhead and coastal cutthroat trout), preventing migration to spawning areas. The original gate failed and was replaced sometime in the 1970s, but had again deteriorated.

OPRD's planning process for Sitka Sedge has considered two scenarios to improve fish passage. The first would remove the tide gate flap from the existing tidebox, leaving a gap of about 4 feet. The second would create an 18-foot gap in the dike, about the combined width of two creeks flowing into the marsh, which may fulfill Oregon's required minimum for fish passage. During public meetings in 2016, there was concern that "existing flooding in Tierra Del Mar could be exacerbated with construction of fish passage improvements". OPRD's 2016 plan called for further data collection on groundwater conditions, and "more complete data on the effects of tidal changes, local streams, and potential storm surge on groundwater levels to neighboring properties in the northern section of Tierra Del Mar, as well as results of hydrologic modeling collected in the process of developing concept alternatives, including water quality information".

OPRD presented an analysis of issues with Beltz dike at a public meeting in January 2020, with a projected timeline for a decision on alternatives, including development of a preliminary habitat restoration design, and a funding strategy for Beltz Marsh, between March and September 2020.

== Natural resources ==
Sitka sedge (Carex aquatilis v. dives) reflects several of the unique characteristics of this new park. Graceful. Ecologically important. Natural.
— Oregon State Parks

When Sitka Sedge officially opened in 2018, it was described as "ocean beach, dunes, forest, tidal marsh, freshwater marsh, shrublands and mudflats", as well as "a day-use area, hiking trails and six wildlife viewing areas that overlook the Sand Lake Estuary, forested dunes and ocean".

=== Beach and dunes ===
Urness described the one-mile beach as "nestled between the cliffs of Cape Lookout to the north and Haystack Rock to the south". He quoted a natural resources specialist from Oregon's state parks: "It's a place that shows what the Oregon Coast looked like in the past, a few hundred years ago."

In 1913, all Oregon beaches below the high tide line were designated as public highways, making all Oregon beaches public land. The 1967 Oregon Beach Bill further defined all Oregon beaches up to the vegetation line as public land. OPRD's 2016 plan described the vegetation on the Sitka Sedge beach sand dunes:

Aerial photography from the period between 1939 and the present shows a rapid progression from sands very sparsely vegetated with native dune species to dense and often nearly impenetrable forest of young trees and thick shrubs. The remaining open dune habitat falls into three main groups: American dunegrass dominated dunes, sparsely vegetated semi-native dunes with native species and sparse encroaching European beachgrass, and those dunes where European beachgrass has already achieved dominance. Some of the European beachgrass dominated habitat contains few species other than the European beachgrass itself. Semi-native dunes often still have significant presence of species such as dune goldenrod, beach knotweed, red fescue, Indian paintbrush, dune bluegrass, and kinnikinnik, in addition to several weedy grass and forb species.

— Sitka Sedge State Natural Area 2016 Draft Master Plan

=== Marshes ===
The total area of the tidal and diked marsh surface of the Sand Lake estuary is about 730 square miles (1,900 km^{2}), according to a 1978 estimate by the Oregon Department of Fish and Wildlife (ODFW). The freshwater marsh south of Beltz dike is fed by Beltz Creek, Roenicke Creek and "No Name" Creek. The diked freshwater marsh surface area was estimated in 1978 to be 11% of the bay subsystem and 8% of the entire estuary. According to that report:

The diked marsh at the south end has remained a wetland but has converted from salt marsh to fresh marsh. It is used by large numbers of ducks in the winter, and the dike, although privately owned, provides access to a popular hunting area. The dike apparently was constructed for flood control rather than agricultural purposes, and the diked area has remained essentially undisturbed since the original alteration.

— Oregon Department of Fish and Wildlife

=== Forests ===
Approximately 113 acres (46 ha) east of Sandlake Road are pasture and forest land. Trees common to the area include shore pine, Sitka spruce, kinnickinnick, red alder, and other conifers.

=== Wildlife ===
According to The Statesman Journal, Sitka Sedge is "one of the largest intact estuaries on the Oregon Coast, teeming with great blue herons and bald eagles, beavers and otters, salmon, coyote and even black bear". The U.S. Fish and Wildlife Service has designated portions of Sitka Sedge as critical habitat for Western snowy plover, and adjacent areas south and east of Sitka Sedge as critical habitat for marbled murrelet and the northern spotted owl. Species designated "at risk" may be present in compatible plant or marine habitats at Sitka Sedge, but have not yet been observed: Oregon silverspot butterfly, seaside hoary elfin butterfly, Chinook salmon, coastal cutthroat trout, Coho salmon, chum salmon, steelhead trout, marbled murrelet, northern spotted owl, western snowy plover, red tree vole, and Pacific marten.

== Recreation ==
The park is minimally developed, with restrooms and a small gravel parking area accommodating up to 26 vehicles (2 spaces are ADA-accessible).

=== Hiking, birding ===
One reporter described in detail her hike with friends at Sitka Sedge, writing: "A wonderful place to experience nature with friends is Sitka Sedge State Natural Area near Pacific City on the Oregon coast." Crossing Beltz dike, she wrote, "On our right are the tidal flats of the Sand Lake Estuary. On our left is a freshwater marsh well on its way to becoming a coastal meadow. The flat trail is edged with a thicket of salal, evergreen huckleberries, elderberries and twinberries." The hike leads to a forest of Douglas firs and Sitka Spruce then through shore pines, finally to the beach and surf.

One observer said, "It's like taking a trip back in time. It provides great habitat for wildlife. Birding is fantastic with the mix of ecosystems, with willow scrub, freshwater marsh, open mud flats and the shoreline."

=== Kayaking ===
Although the marshes of Sand Lake are too shallow for most boats, "from October to March, the winter tides make it possible to explore a variety of landscapes around the lake and Whalen Island", by kayak, according to Urness. He also reported the tides were so high on his trip their kayaks were able to surf a few waves at the north end of the lake.

=== Accessibility ===
ADA-accessible Beltz Dike trail leads to the Estuary View Loop and Kinnikinnik Woods Loop and includes two accessible viewing areas.

== See also ==
- List of Oregon state parks
- Sandlake, Oregon
