= Oregon Coast =

Coastal region of the U.S. state of Oregon

Coordinates: 44°N 124.1°W

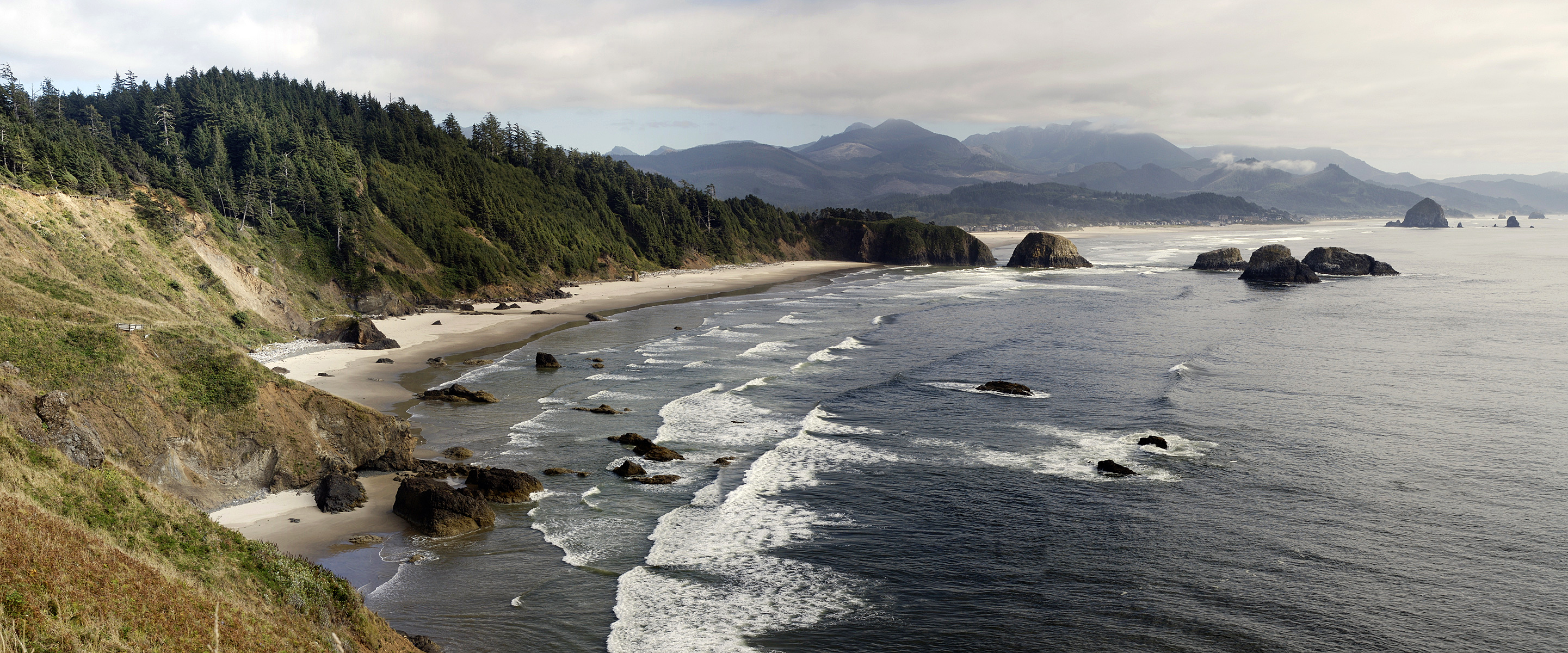
Southward view from Ecola State Park, Northern Oregon Coast

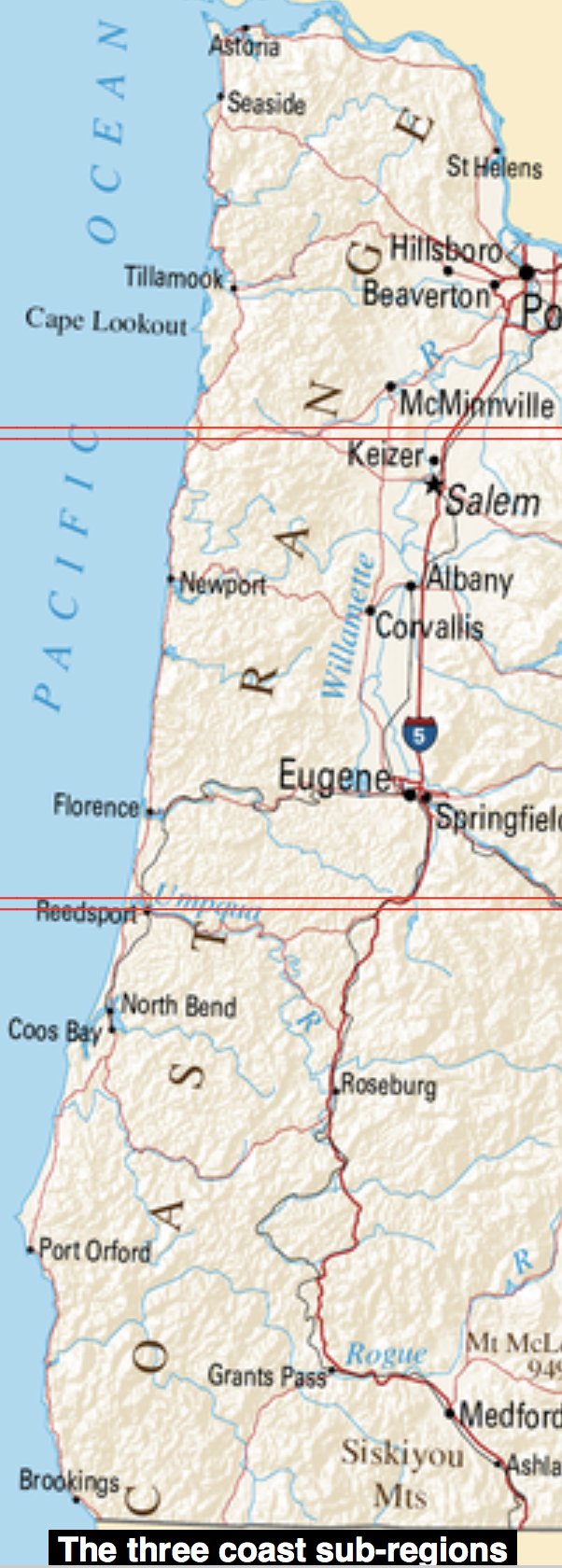
Map of the Oregon Coast

The Oregon Coast is a coastal region of the U.S. state of Oregon. It is bordered by the Pacific Ocean on the west and the Oregon Coast Range to the east, and stretches approximately 362 miles (583 km) from the California state border in the south to the Columbia River in the north. The region is not a specific geological, environmental, or political entity, and includes the Columbia River Estuary.

The Oregon Beach Bill of 1967 allows free beach access to everyone. In return for a pedestrian easement and relief from construction, the bill eliminates property taxes on private beach land and allows its owners to retain certain beach land rights.

Traditionally, the Oregon Coast is regarded as three distinct sub–regions:

- The North Coast, which stretches from the Columbia River to Cascade Head.
- The Central Coast, which stretches from Cascade Head to Reedsport.
- The South Coast, which stretches from Reedsport to the Oregon–California border.

The largest city is Coos Bay, population 16,700 in Coos County on the South Coast. U.S. Route 101 is the primary highway from Brookings to Astoria and is known for its scenic overlooks of the Pacific Ocean. Over 80 state parks and recreation areas dot the Oregon Coast. However, only a few highways cross the Coast Range to the interior: US 30, US 26, OR 6, OR 22, US 20, OR 18, OR 34, OR 126, OR 38, and OR 42. OR 18 and US 20 are considered among the dangerous roads in the state.

The Oregon Coast includes Clatsop County, Tillamook County, Lincoln County, western Lane County, western Douglas County, Coos County, and Curry County.

== Geography ==
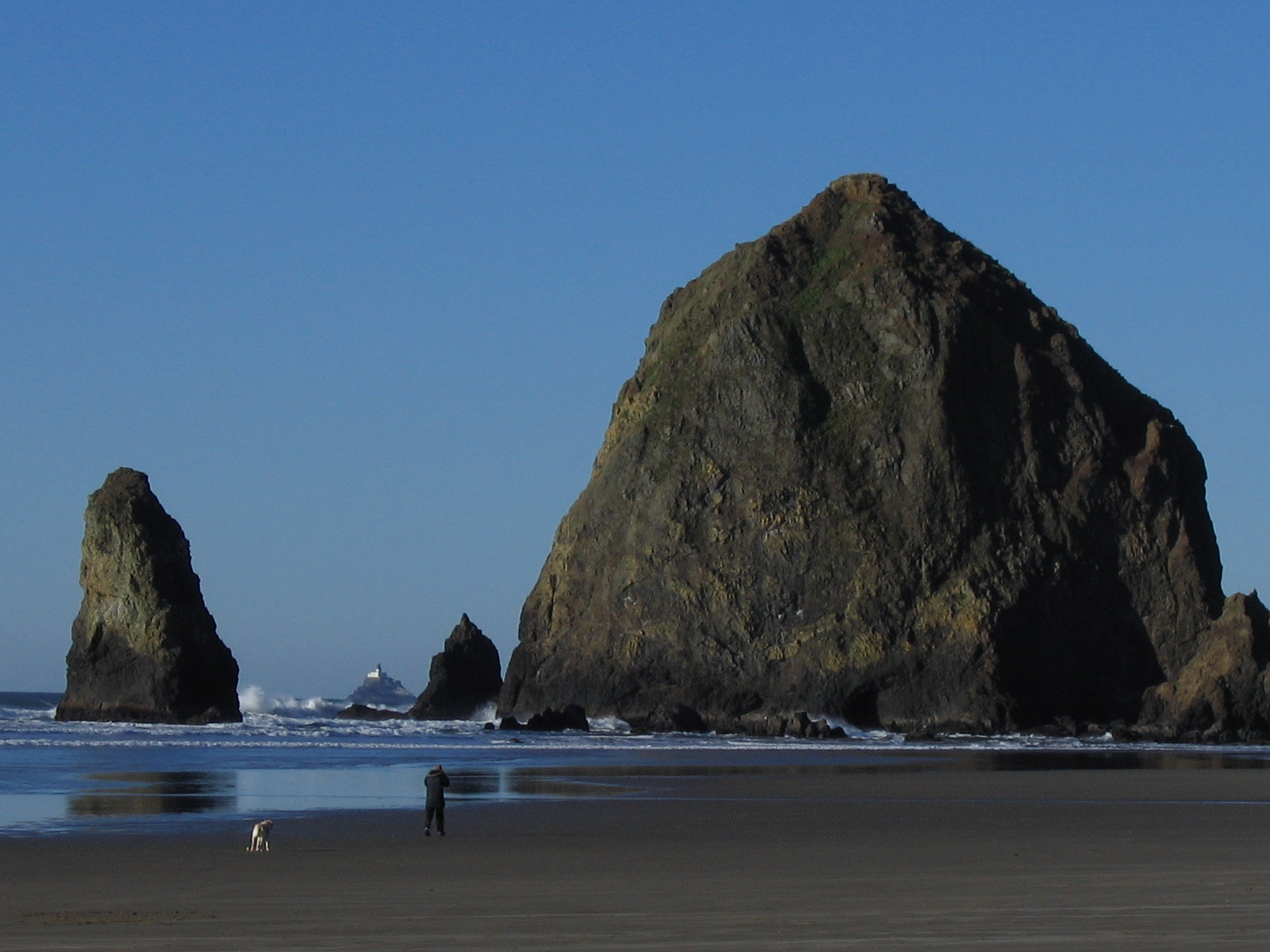
Haystack Rock, a 235 ft (72 m) sea stack on Cannon Beach, Oregon

The Oregon Coast is divided into three different regions based on their geological formations: the North Coast, Central Coast, and South Coast. Three primary landforms appear along its shoreline: sea cliffs, beaches, and stacks. Minor land variation, city size, and socioeconomic differences between the North and Central regions cause division between them to be made along geological lines.

=== North Coast ===
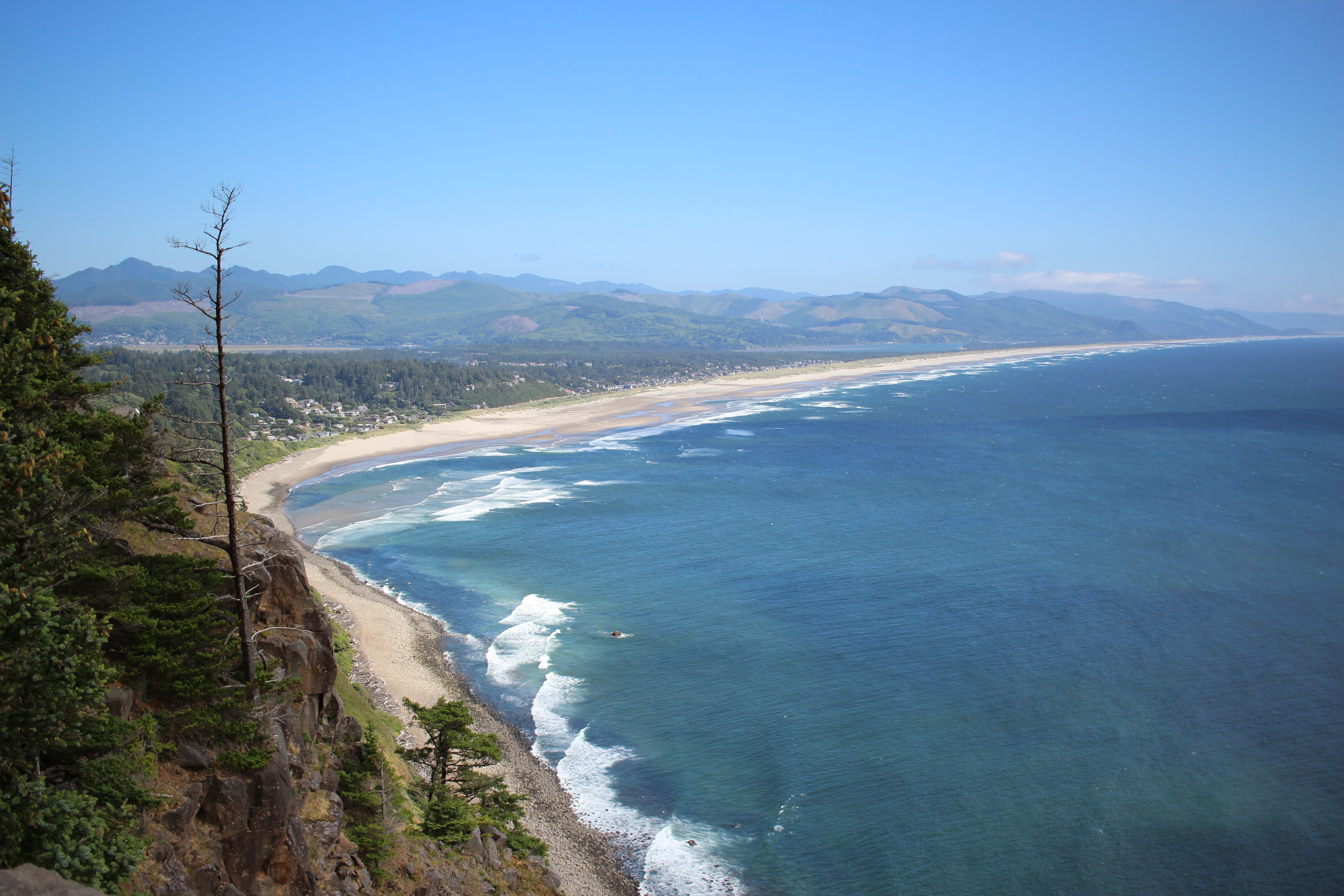
North coast

The North Coast, which stretches from the Columbia River to Cascade Head, possesses longer stretches of unbroken beach (due to silt deposits washed southwards from the Columbia River), a higher concentration of logging zones, and larger, but less frequent sandbar-enclosed bays. Astoria serves as a staging ground for ships entering and leaving the Columbia River, because of the dangerous Columbia Bar. Ships wishing to make the passage require the aid of specially trained bar pilots. Along the coast are the cities of Seaside, Cannon Beach and Tillamook. Seaside and Cannon Beach lie directly on the Pacific Ocean, whereas Tillamook lies inland along Tillamook Bay. Because of the low lands that exist on this region of coast, flooding is an annual problem, especially in the winter, when storms push in from the North Pacific. Tillamook is particularly affected by these yearly floods, because of its location on a major floodplain. Sandstone cliffs occur rather sporadically in this region. This is due to relatively slow uplift rates as well as fairly constant sediment wash from the Columbia River. Future uplift from the subduction of the Juan de Fuca Plate will eventually create sandstone cliffs similar to those found further south and north. The North Oregon Coast is also a part of the Graveyard of the Pacific.

The weather on the North Coast is moderate. The average low in the winter is just under 40 °F (4 °C), while the high temperature is just above 50 °F (10 °C). The average high reaches its peak in early September at 70 °F (21 °C). The most rain occurs in November and December averaging over 11 inches (280 mm) each month. July and August are the driest averaging under 2 inches (51 mm) of rain each month. Most days are cloudy or partly cloudy throughout the year. The summer has the most sun with approximately half the days sunny or partly cloudy.

=== Central Coast ===
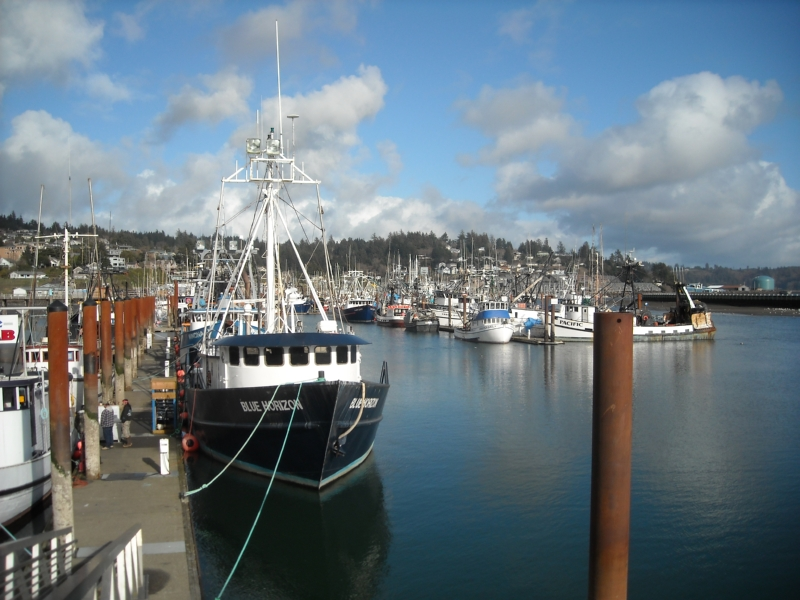
Harbor in Yaquina Bay, Newport, Oregon

The Central Coast, which extends from Cascade Head to Reedsport, while similar to the North Coast, possesses fewer sandy beaches, more sea cliffs and terraces, and a greater number of bays. Several small urban areas exist in this region. Among these are the cities of Lincoln City, Depoe Bay, Newport, Waldport, and Yachats. Because the usable lands of the region are squeezed between the mountains and the ocean, most urban areas are relatively small but are still larger than those of the South Coast region. The southernmost area of Central coast is the intermediary zone for this region and the more mountainous South Coast region. Exposed sandstone cliffs are also common along the beaches and highway. Local sandstones of the Central Coast were uplifted during the Neogene Era. Higher layers of exposed sandstone are often varying shades of orange, and are often quite soft to the touch, often being very brittle, and relatively easily eroded. Lower exposed layers, though less frequent, reveal harder sandstone deposits. Unlike the higher layers, they are often gray-brown in color and hard in comparison. This lower sandstone often breaks off in large, squared chunks.

The weather on the central coast is similar to that of the north coast except the frequency of sunny or partly cloudy days is higher in the summer, approaching 75%.

=== South Coast ===
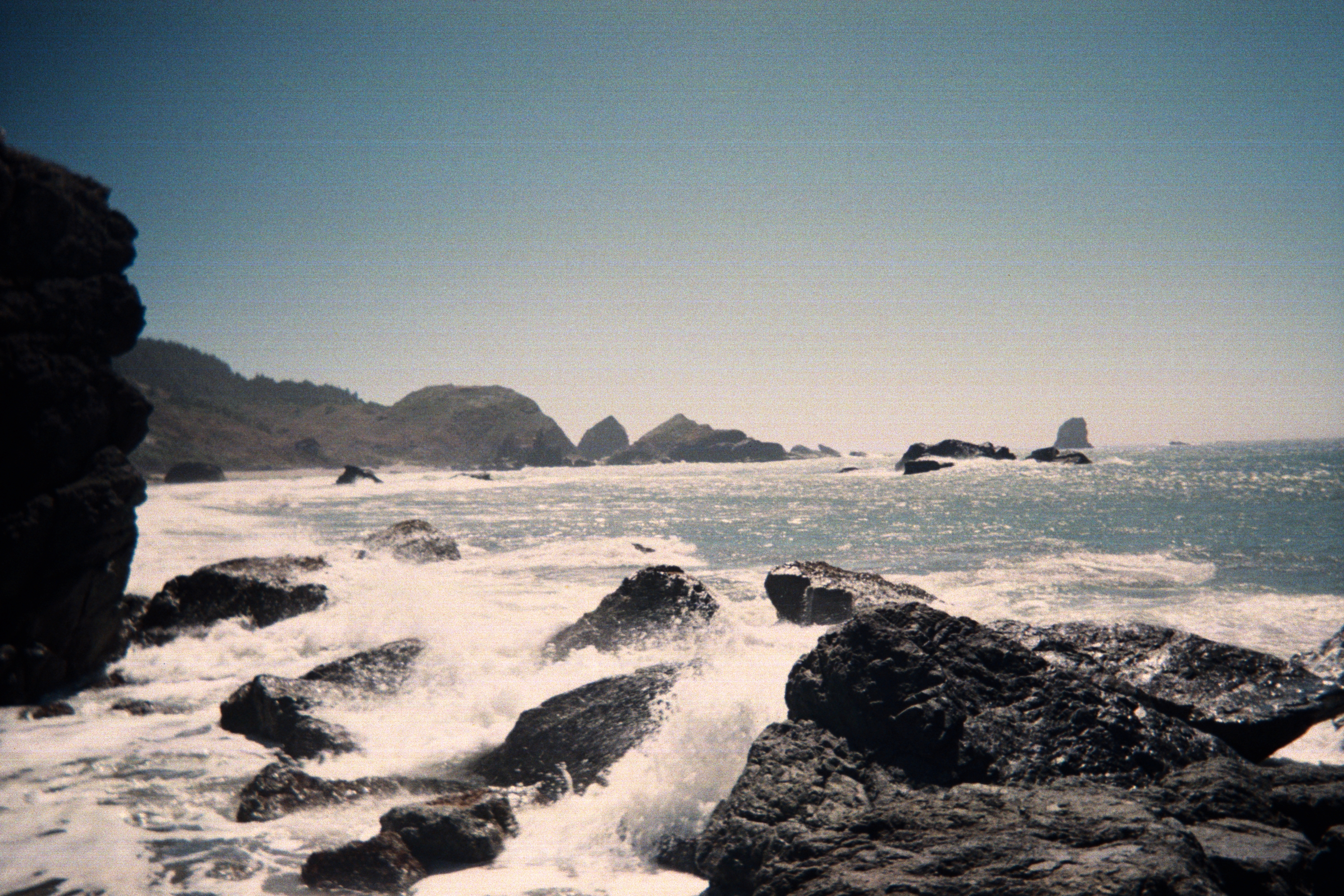
Waves crashing on rocks on the South Coast

The South Coast region, which extends from Reedsport to the California border, is distinct from the North and Central Coast regions because of its mountainous nature, due to tectonic uplift and terrane accretion in ancient times. Much of the coastline in this region is made up of sea cliffs and miles of beaches. Among the landscape of the region exists the Oregon Dunes. There are seven incorporated cities on the south coast: Reedsport, North Bend, Coos Bay, Bandon, Port Orford, Gold Beach, and Brookings. Cape Blanco, which is approximately 6.4 miles (10.3 km) north of Port Orford, is the westernmost point in Oregon. Cape Blanco extends further west than any point of land in the contiguous United States (lower 48 states) except Cape Alava, in Washington. Though the landforms of the region are relatively consistent, the South Coast shows a change in ecology. It is in this region that the western redcedar and Sitka spruce forests give way to the more southerly coast redwood, Port Orford cedar, and Douglas-fir forests, which also include the northern extent of Oregon Myrtle trees (aka California Bay Laurel).

The weather on the south coast is similar to that of the north and central coasts except the frequency of sunny or partly cloudy days is higher in the summer, approaching 90%.

== Communities ==
=== Cities ===
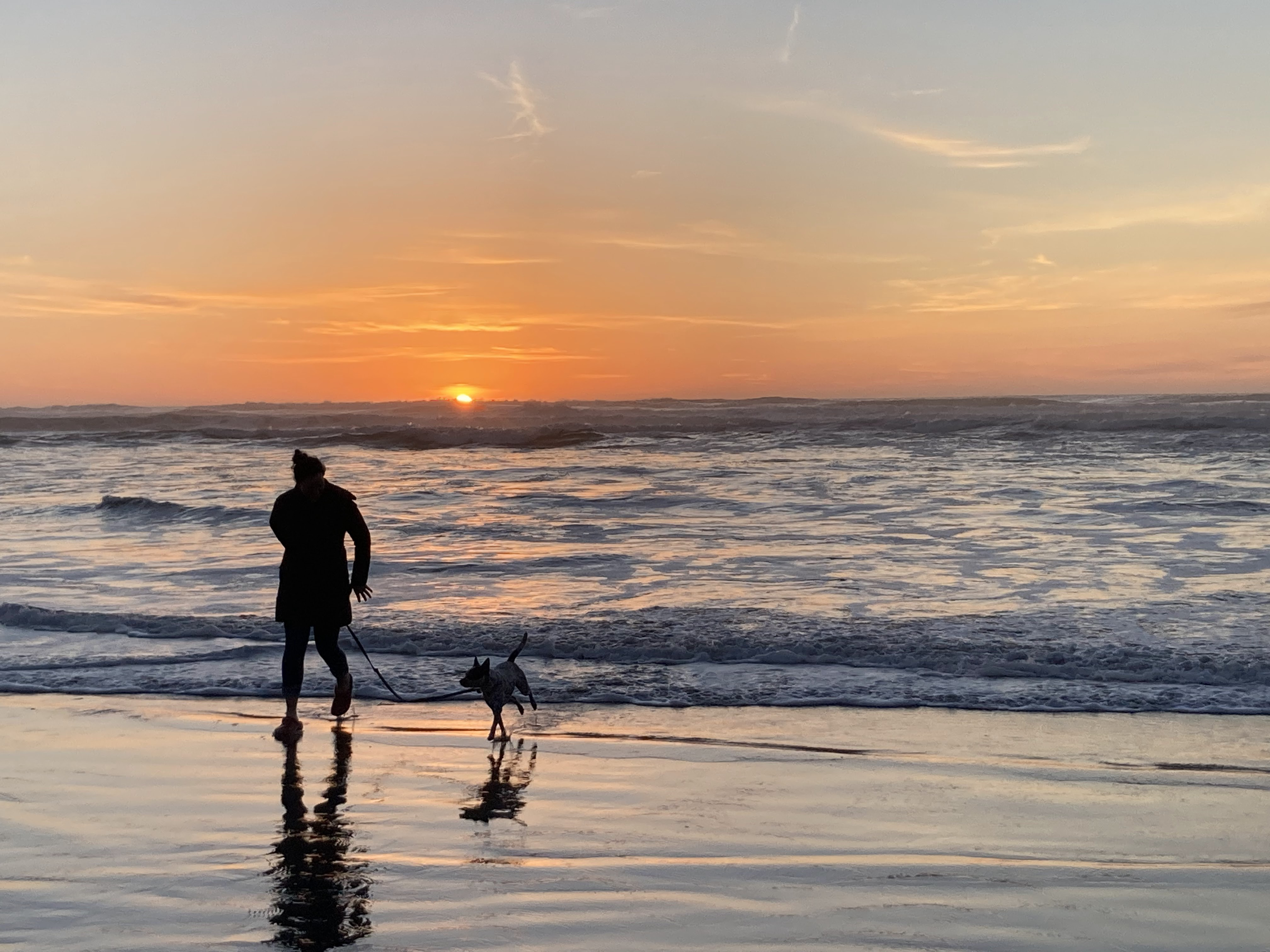
A woman and her dog at Rockaway Beach

- Astoria
- Bandon
- Bay City
- Brookings
- Cannon Beach
- Coos Bay
- Coquille
- Depoe Bay
- Florence
- Garibaldi
- Gearhart
- Gold Beach
- Lincoln City
- Manzanita
- Nehalem
- Newport
- North Bend
- Port Orford
- Reedsport
- Rockaway Beach
- Seaside
- Tillamook
- Waldport
- Warrenton
- Wheeler
- Yachats

=== Census-designated places and unincorporated communities ===
- Agate Beach
- Arch Cape
- Barview (Coos County)
- Barview (Tillamook County)
- Bayside Gardens
- Beverly Beach
- Brighton
- Brownsmead
- Cape Meares
- Carpenterville
- Charleston
- Cooston
- Gardiner
- Glasgow
- Gleneden Beach
- Harbor
- Heceta Beach
- Hobsonville
- Hunter Creek
- Idaville
- Jeffers Garden
- Kernville
- Knappa
- Langlois
- Lincoln Beach
- Manhattan Beach
- Miles Crossing
- Mohler
- Navy Heights
- Neahkahnie Beach
- Nedonna Beach
- Nesika Beach
- Neskowin
- Netarts
- Ocean Park
- Oceanside
- Ophir
- Oretown
- Otter Rock
- Pacific City
- Pistol River
- Sandlake
- Seal Rock
- South Beach
- Sunset Beach
- Surf Pines
- Svensen
- Tierra Del Mar
- Tolovana Park
- Wedderburn
- Winchester Bay
- Yaquina

=== Former communities ===
- Bayocean
- Cutler City
- Delake
- Eastside
- Empire
- Flavel
- Fort Stevens
- Frankport
- Hammond
- Lexington
- Nelscott
- Oceanlake
- Roads End
- Skipanon
- Taft
- Wecoma Beach

== Ecology ==
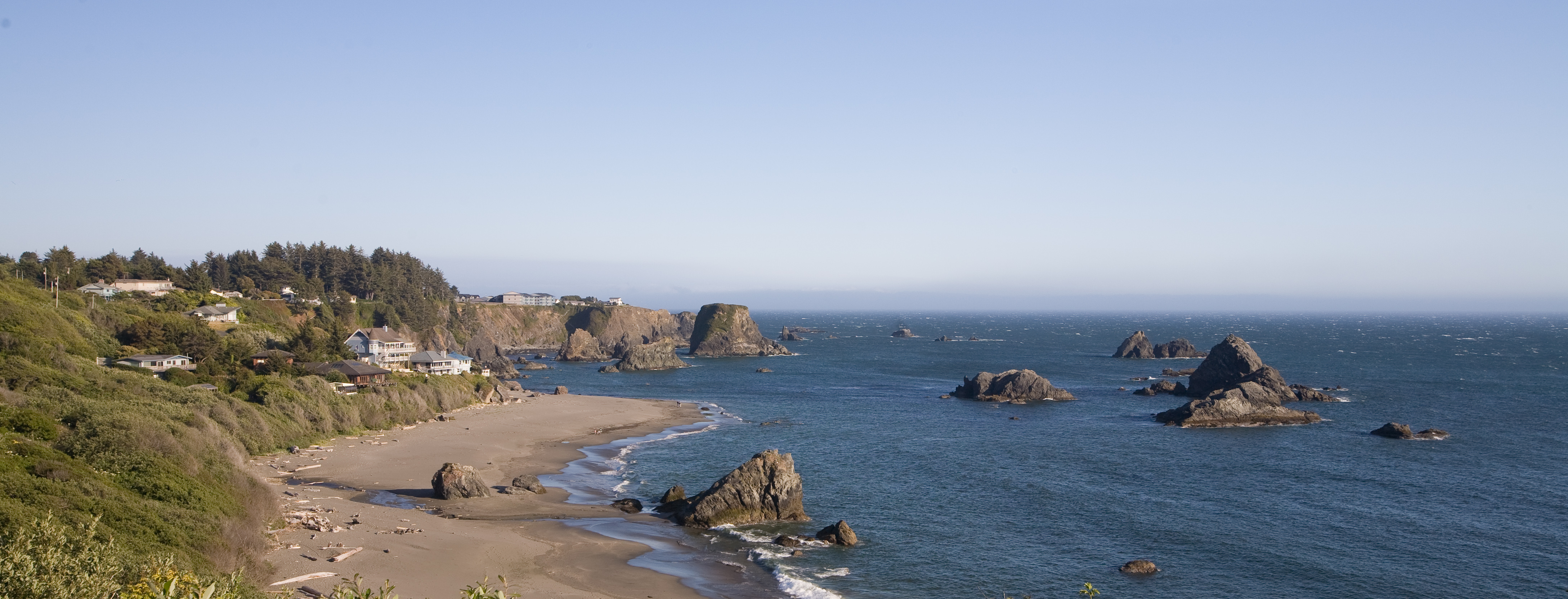
Chetco Point, Brookings, Oregon

Because of the Oregon Coast's physical complexity, many different species of plant and animal can be found in the region, both terrestrial and marine in nature. However, past human interaction has caused a decline in several species of animal along the coast, such as the sea otter. Strict regulations as well as modern human aid has seen a return of some species in recent years.

The Oregon Coast is the location of the Oregon Coast National Wildlife Refuge Complex, which consists of six wildlife refuges, covering 371 acres (1.50 km^{2}), spread over a distance of 320 miles (515 km).

=== Land ===
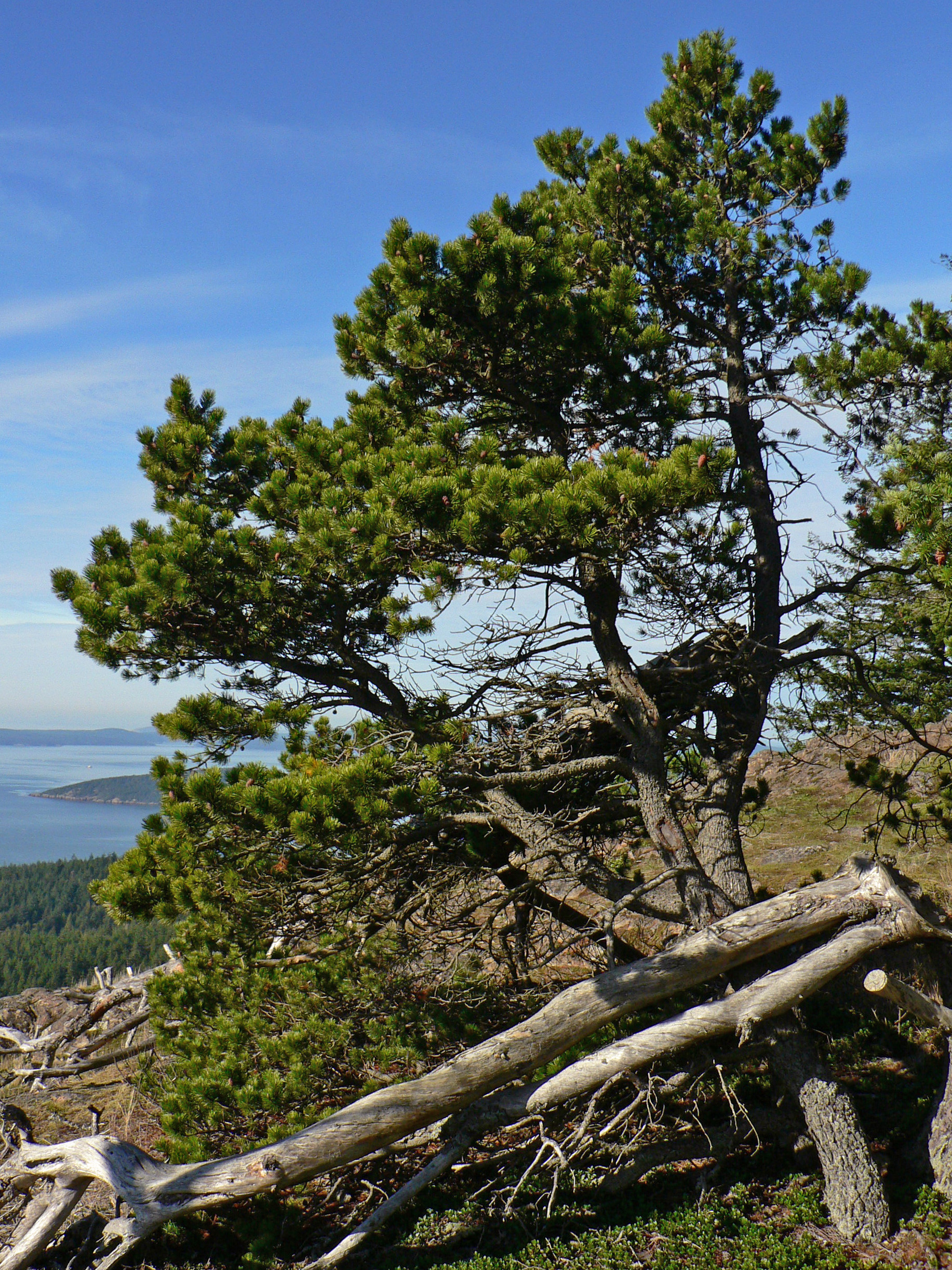
Shore Pine, (P. contorta subsp. contorta)

Due to several factors, including climate, weather, and terrain, there is a great variety of plants within the coast region. In some areas, large trees are uncommon. This is because severe winter storms and poor soil limit the growing height of many species. Shore pine (Pinus contorta subsp.contorta) are common in these areas. However several species of fir, pine, and cedar can be found, including a few endemic species, such as the Port Orford cedar (Chamaecyparis lawsoniana). Because of this, logging has been a historically viable trade for the region. In the North Coast region near Astoria, and in Lincoln County, large tracts of land are second and third generation woodland, having been logged and replanted in the past.

Because of the salt carried inland by constant onshore winds, only the hardiest varieties of small plant can thrive close to shore. Coastal strawberry and Pacific silverweed are common along the coast due to their reproductive advantages and salt tolerance.

Like many forested regions of the western United States and Canada, many large species of animal can be found in the woods of the region. Most common are the Roosevelt elk and black-tailed deer, as well as bobcats and North American cougar. All four species, though common now, were uncommon in the past, having moved more heavily into the region with the beginning of timber harvest. Likewise, smaller species, including nutrias and Virginia opossum can also be found, as well as the Townsend's mole, which inhabits many lowland and floodplain areas.

=== Marine ===
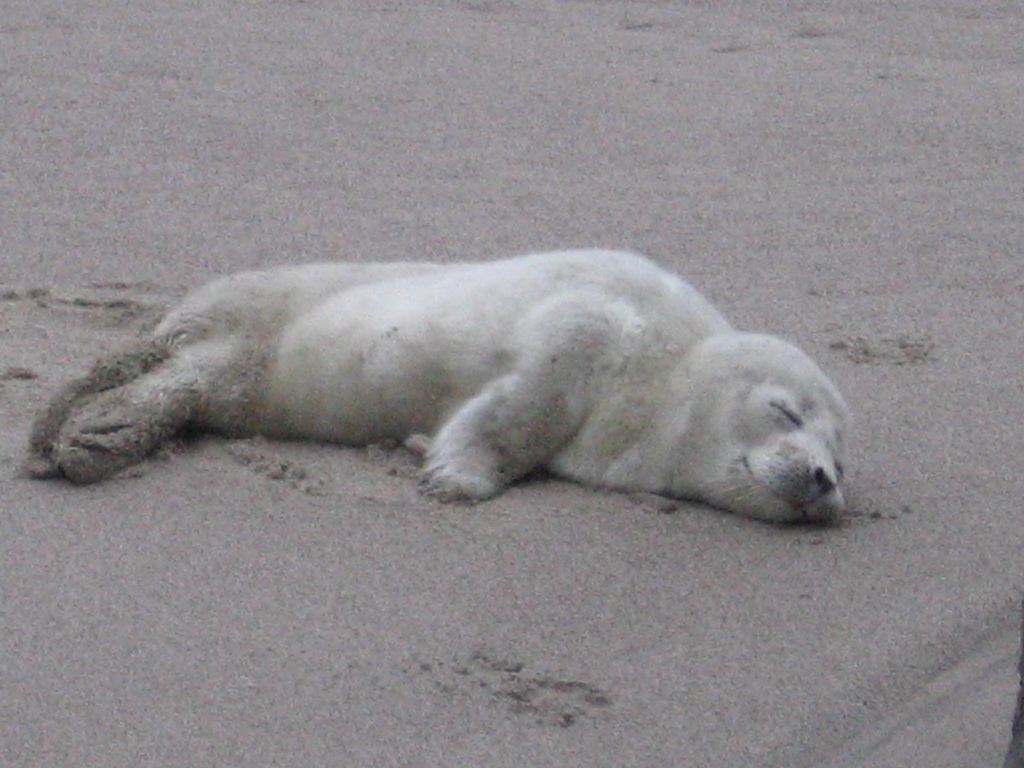
Harbor seal pup sleeping on a beach near Lincoln City

The marine ecology of the Oregon Coast is some of the most diverse in the world. More than 29 species of marine mammals make their home on the Oregon Coast, including several species of seal, including the Steller's sea lion and harbor seal, as well as the less common northern elephant seal and California sea lion. The Sea Lion Caves near Florence, and the bay front in Newport are the best places to see Steller's sea lions and harbor seals, though they can be observed in many other places. Seal pups can sometimes be seen on sandy beaches resting. Signs are often posted on beaches warning of this, as the law prohibits disturbing them. Formerly, populations of sea otter could be found on the coast. However, fur hunters have wiped out the Oregon populations. Prior to the sighting in February 2009 in Depoe Bay, no sea otters had been sighted in over 103 years. Occasionally, large Humboldt Squid wash up onto the beaches after following warm currents which dissipate leaving the squid to die of hypothermia.

Several species of whale can be observed in the waters near shore, especially during migration in late December and late March, such as gray whale, orca, and humpback whale. Harbor porpoises are also relatively common. Because of this, whale watching is a common tourist attraction along the coast. Tour boats often take passengers on whale watching tours, though it is possible to do so from shore. It is sometimes the case that whale carcasses are beached on Oregon shores. One such beaching, which occurred near Florence in November, 1970, was handled by blowing it up using dynamite. This has become the well-known exploding whale incident.

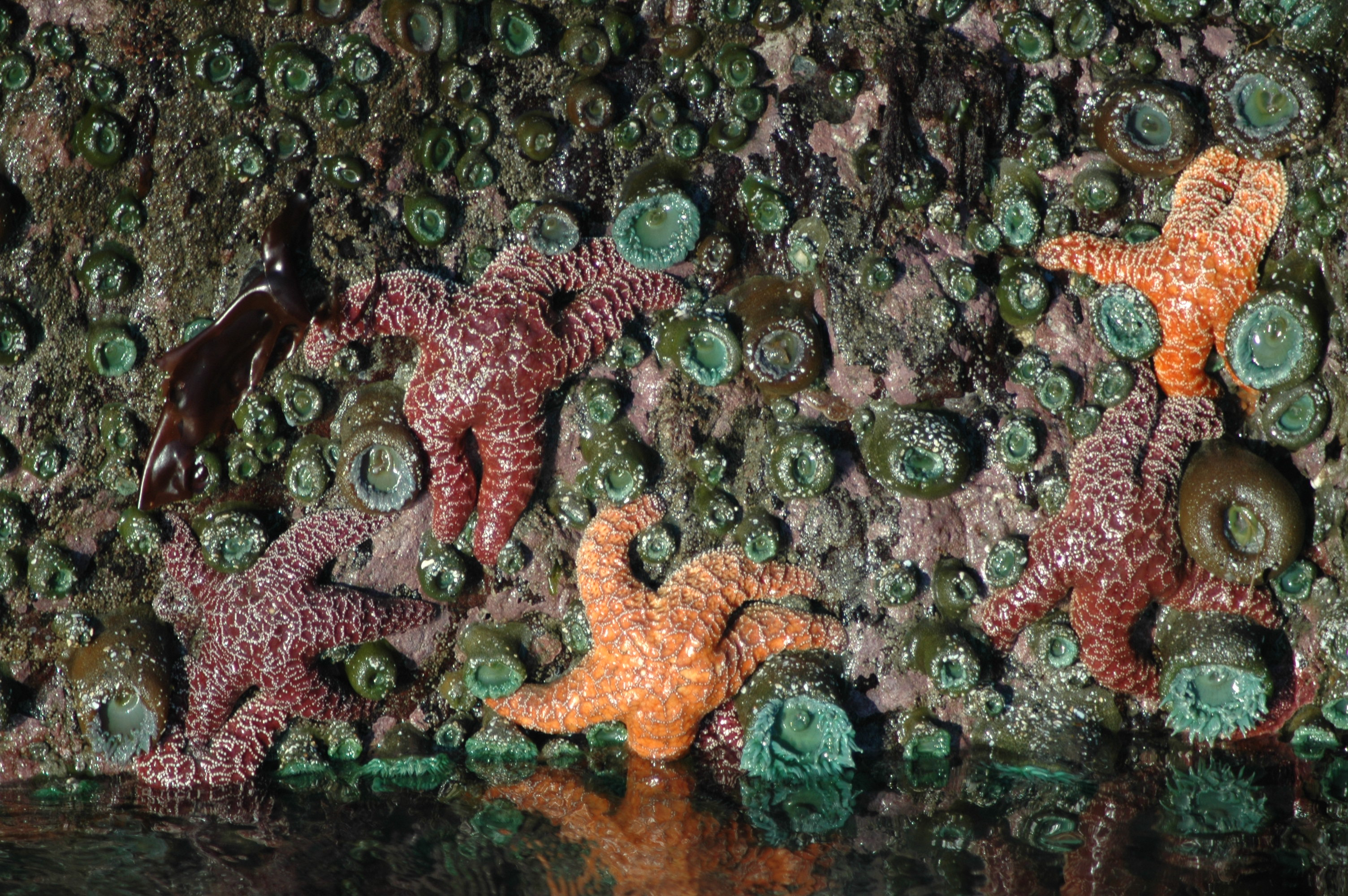
Sea star and sea anemone at Bandon Beach tidepool

Tidepools, which occur frequently along Oregon's rocky shores, are unique, contained ecosystems housing up to many hundreds of species of animal. Red, green, and brown algae are common sights. Many species of invertebrates can also be found in these coastal tidepools, and include sponges, sea anemones, mussels, sea stars, limpets, crabs, shrimp, barnacles, sea urchins, and sea cucumbers. Sunset Bay State Park, near Coos Bay, and Strawberry Hill, near Yachats, are among the largest collections of tidepools and are popular places for exploring them.

Also common along the coast are kelp forests and rock reefs. Both areas harbor much of Oregon's marine life, including many species of fish, such as the numerous species of rockfish, flatfish, and greenlings. Because these areas provide a shelter from oceanic currents, these zones share many invertebrate species with the onshore tidal zone. Because of the rich diversity of life, most animal species along the Oregon coast depend on these keystone zones for survival.

=== Coastal birds ===
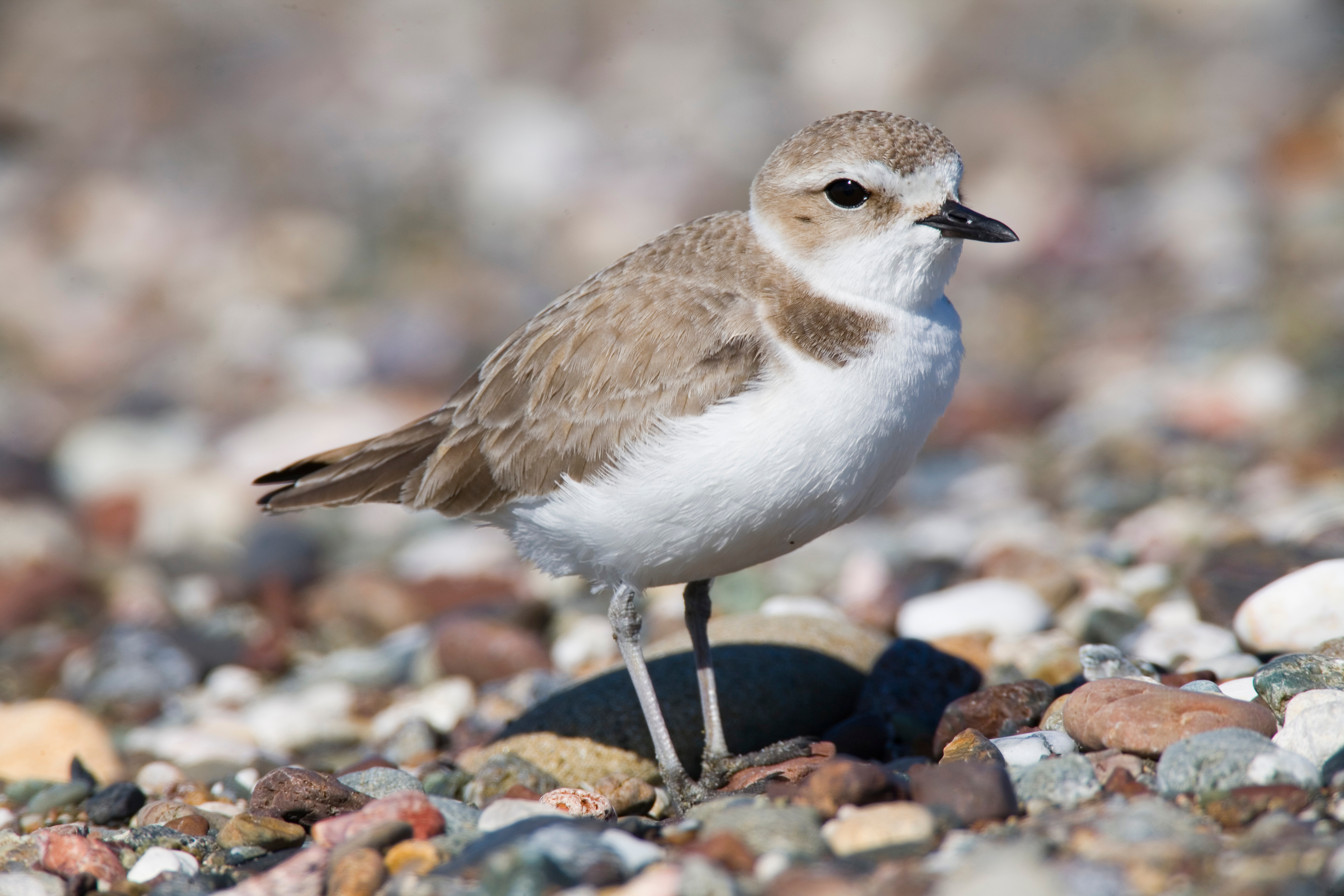
Snowy plovers are common along the Oregon Coast

Many varieties of birds make their home on the Oregon Coast. Because of the variety of birds found in the area, bird watching is a common pastime. Birds along the Oregon Coast can be divided into four categories:

- Seabirds spend most of their lives at sea and are adapted to ocean life. Some even sleep in the water, though they must all return to land to lay their eggs. Their diets consist mostly of small fish, squid, shellfish, and crustaceans. Species of seabirds on the Oregon Coast include the common murre, tufted puffin, marbled murrelet, the black oystercatcher, auklets, many varieties of cormorants, the western gull, and glaucous-winged gull.
- Shorebirds, unlike seabirds, do not have webbed feet and spend their lives on the shore foraging for food, eating worms, insect larvae, amphipods, copepods, crustaceans, and mollusks. Among the types of shorebirds on the Coast are the western and least sandpiper, dunlin, whimbrel, the semipalmated and western snowy plover, and killdeer.
- Many birds of prey live on the coast, eating small birds, rodents, and small mammals. These include the bald eagle, barn owl, and osprey.
- Waterfowl also make their homes in the freshwater areas around the Coast. These are the many varieties of ducks and geese in the area.

=== Sharks ===
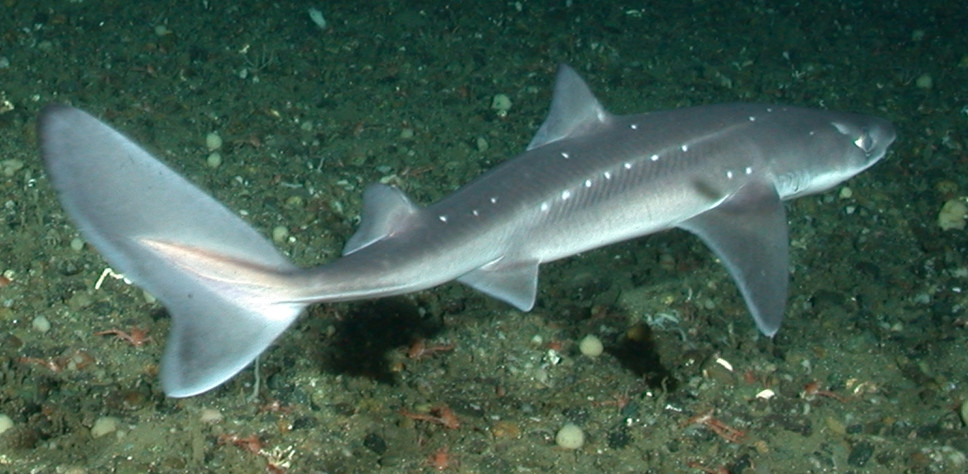
The Spiny dogfish (Squalus acanthias) – indigenous to waters off the Pacific Coast

The Oregon coastal waters are known to have 16 species of shark present:

- Basking shark (Cetorhinus maximus)
- Blue shark (Prionace glauca)
- Broadnose sevengill shark
- Brown catshark (Apristurus brunneus)
- Brown smooth-hound shark (Mustelus henlei) south coast only
- Common thresher shark (Alopias vulpinus)
- Filetail catshark (Parmaturus xaniurus) central and south coast only
- Leopard shark (Triakis semifasciata)
- Longnose catshark (Apristurus kampae) south coast only
- Pacific angelshark (Squatina californica)
- Salmon shark (Lamna ditropis)
- Shortfin mako shark (Isurus oxyrinchus)
- Soupfin shark (Galeorhinus galeus)
- Spiny dogfish (Squalus acanthias)
- Tiger shark (Galeocerdo cuvier)
- White shark (Carcharodon carcharias)

There are one or two shark bites reported along the Oregon coast each year, mostly boats and surfing boards being tasted. Every few years—a total of 25 since 1900—a human is bitten. Every Oregon victim has survived. The last was Joseph Tanner, October 10, 2016.

== History ==
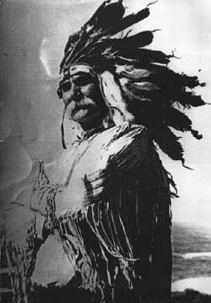
Hoxie Simmons, Rogue River Indian, c. 1870

It is generally accepted that the first indigenous peoples arrived in the region around 11,000–13,000 years ago, likely drawn by the rich natural resources of the area. However, very little is known about these early peoples, as very few archeological sites exist from before 3,500 years ago. Several tribes and language families would eventually form along the coast. Major groups included the Clatsop, Tillamook, Alsea, Siuslaw, Coos, and Coquille. The lifestyles of these tribes were very similar and sometimes interlinked, with the defining differences being the languages they spoke. Because of the abundance of food in the region, most settlements were permanent. Many of the tribes subsisted primarily on seafoods such as clams, salmon, and seals, as well as berries.

=== European exploration (1775–1811) ===
European exploration of the Oregon Coast began in the 18th century as Spanish mariners sailed northward from Mexico to explore and later stake claim to the region, led by explorer Vasco Núñez de Balboa's claim of the entire Pacific and shores in the name of the Spanish Crown. The earliest expedition recorded along the Pacific Northwest coast, however, was led by Spaniard Juan José Pérez Hernández aboard the sloop Santiago in 1774. Pérez's findings were kept a secret and much of the credit for his findings went to later explorers. Pérez's expedition was followed soon after by the 1775 expedition led by Bruno de Heceta and Juan Francisco de la Bodega y Quadra, in which Pérez served as pilot. These further explorations led to many discoveries along the Oregon and Washington Coasts. Heceta Head was later named after Bruno de Heceta.

At the same time as the Spanish expeditions, British mariners also began to explore the region, led by explorers Sir Francis Drake in the 16th century and later by James Cook and George Vancouver in the 18th century. British expeditions made many discoveries in the region. Drake called the area New Albion, though the exact location of New Albion remains a mystery. Vancouver would make the most extensive explorations of the region during his expeditions.

Meanwhile, American Captain Robert Gray, aboard the sloop Washington, visited the Oregon Coast in his 1788 voyage to the west coast of the Americas. In August, 1788, Gray attempted to gain entrance to the mouth of the Columbia. However, Gray accidentally grounded the Washington on a sand bar, and the ship was attacked by natives, in which one crew member was killed and the mate wounded. Gray returned in 1792 aboard the Columbia, where he met with British Captain Vancouver off the Strait of Juan de Fuca. Gray mentioned the river to Vancouver, which Gray had named the Columbia. Vancouver quietly dismissed this claim by Gray, thinking that the Columbia was a part of the Juan de Fuca Strait. Vancouver was loath to later admit Gray's correct discovery of the Columbia River.

==== Lewis and Clark Expedition ====
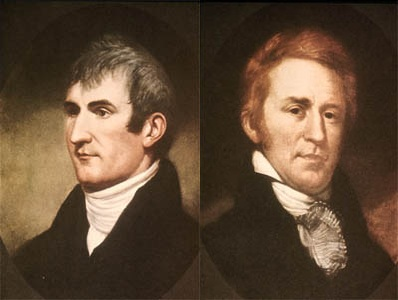
Meriwether Lewis and William Clark

In 1803, with the successful purchase of the Louisiana Territory from France, President Thomas Jefferson ordered an expedition to the west coast, which was led by Captain Meriwether Lewis and William Clark. The Lewis and Clark Expedition reached the Oregon Coast in early winter of 1805, where they built Fort Clatsop near present-day Astoria. During their stay at Fort Clatsop, the Corps of Discovery made many observations about the landscape and local life, as well as establishing relations with the local Clatsop Indians. The expedition began their return trip to Washington D.C. in March 1806. The Lewis and Clark Expedition would have long-lasting effects for the Pacific Northwest and began the settlement of the U.S. west coast, even though heavy settlement of the Oregon Coast would not come until half a century later.

=== Pioneer settlement (1811–1859) ===
A few years later, in 1811, employees of John Jacob Astor's Pacific Fur Company set up a trading post at the mouth of the Columbia River and set up the first permanent U.S. settlement – Astoria. However, the settlement was not as profitable as Astor had hoped it would be. It was sold to the British North West Company in 1812 and became part of its Columbia District. In 1838, Charles Wilkes, on a voyage commissioned by U.S. Congress, landed on the Oregon Coast and raised the American flag. British claims were slowly lost with the increasing number of pioneers traveling to Oregon along the Oregon Trail, and 8 years later, the Oregon Treaty was signed with Britain, ending the half-century claims to Oregon and the Oregon Coast by the British.

=== 1860–present ===
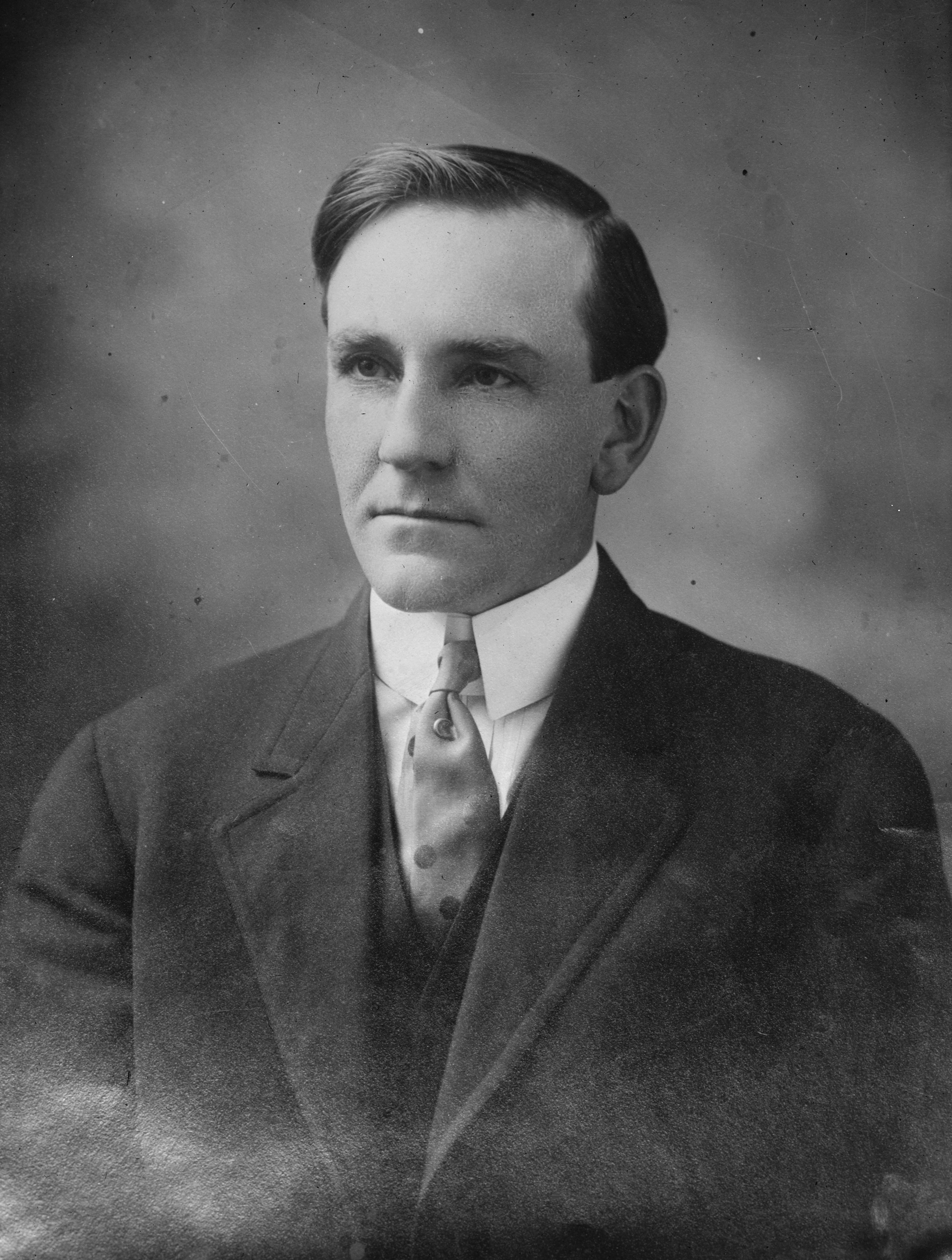
Former Oregon Governor Oswald West

After Oregon attained statehood in 1859 and the completion of railroads throughout the Coast Range, development of land quickly began along many of the Coasts bays and rivers. Logging and commercial fishing soon became the primary industries in the area, and several ports were built to facilitate both industries. In 1870, the first lighthouse at Cape Blanco was built and was soon followed by both the Yaquina Bay Light and Yaquina Head Light in 1871 and 1873, respectively. The last Coast Guard operated light, Cape Arago Light, was built in 1934.

However, in 1874, Oregon State Land Board began to sell public tidelands to private landowners. Soon, resorts were built alongside the beaches in towns such as Seaside, Newport, and Rockaway Beach. The completion of railroads from the primary population centers in the Willamette Valley, the beginnings of tourism started along the coast.

In 1911, governor Oswald West was elected on the promise to reclaim Oregon's beaches as public land. Though the legislature favored the privatization of these lands, West was able to make an argument for public ownership based on the need for transportation, and in 1913, the Oregon legislature declared the entire length of the ocean shore from the Columbia to California as a state highway. Legislators also created the State Highway Commission, which began the construction of U.S. Route 101 along the coast. The Parks and Recreation Department, a branch of the highway commission, bought land for 36 state parks along the coastal highway, an average of one every 10 miles (16 km). With the completion of the highway-and-parks system, coastal tourism skyrocketed. Recent years have seen a drop in both the logging and fishing industries, due mainly to changes in the U.S. economy as well as changes in regulations governing the harvest of fish and timber.

==== 1967 Oregon Beach Bill ====
Oregon's public lands claim was challenged in 1966, when a motel owner fenced off beach area for the private use of his guests. Responding to citizen complaints, state legislators put forward the Oregon Beach Bill, proposing to reestablish the beaches' status as public land. Concerns about private property rights threatened the bill's passage. In response, Governor Tom McCall staged a dramatic media event on May 13, 1967, flying two helicopters to the beach with a team of surveyors and scientists. The ensuing media coverage resulted in overwhelming public demand for the bill, which passed and was signed by McCall on July 6, 1967.

The Beach Bill declares that all "wet sand" within 16 feet (4.9 m) vertical feet of the low tide line belongs to the state of Oregon. In addition, it recognizes public easements of all beach areas up to the line of vegetation, regardless of underlying property rights. The public has "free and uninterrupted use of the beaches," and property owners are required to seek state permits for building and other uses of the ocean shore. While some parts of the beach remain privately owned, state and federal courts have upheld Oregon's right to regulate development of those lands and preserve public access.

== Tourism ==
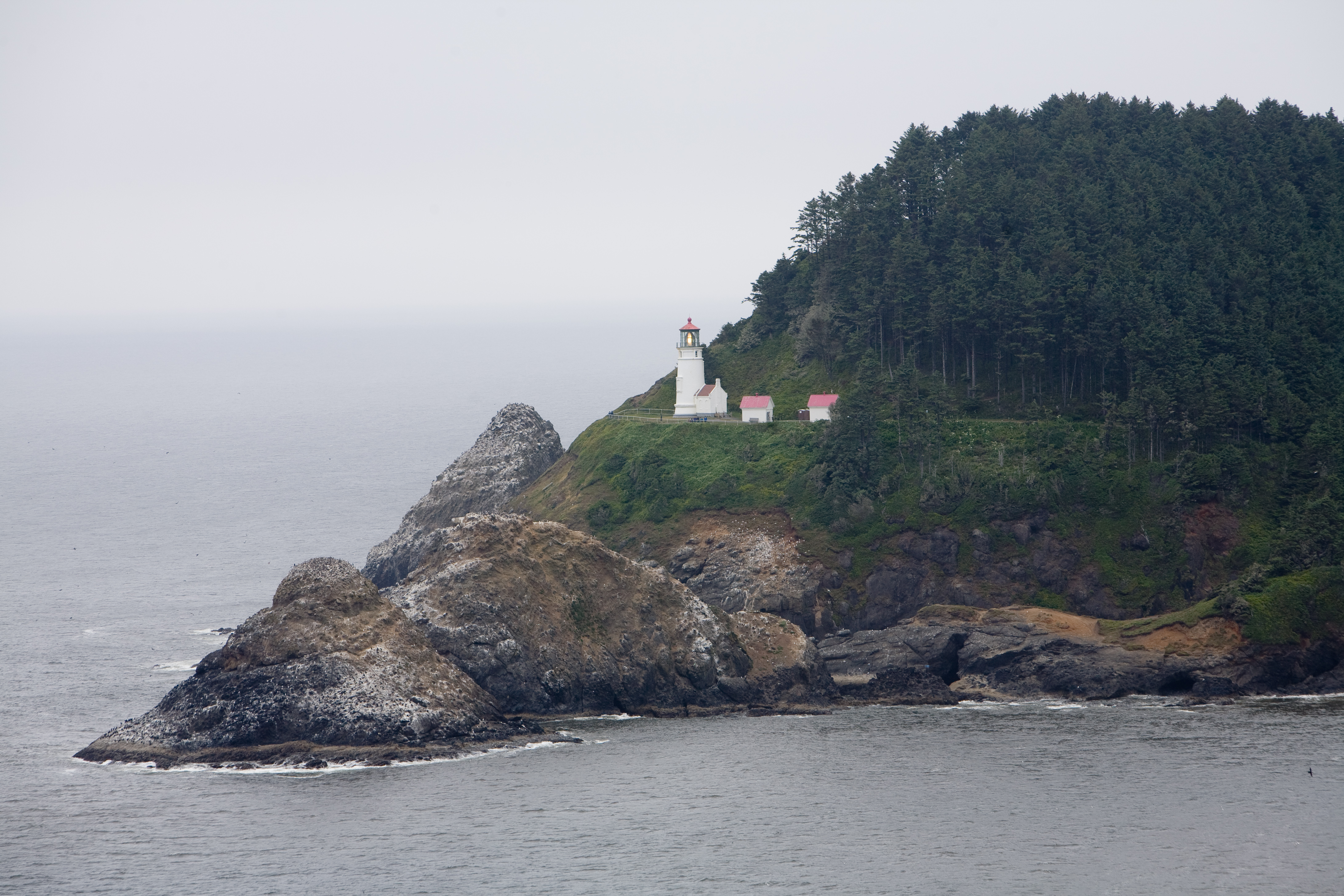
Heceta Head Lighthouse near Florence

Due to its scenery, wildlife, and history, the Oregon Coast is a popular travel destination. Hiking, sport fishing, cycling, kite flying, scuba diving, surfing, sandboarding, and boating are common activities for visitors to the region. Historic areas, such as Fort Clatsop, Battle Rock, and Oregon's lighthouses are all popular sites for visitors. The Oregon Coast is also known for its scenic areas, such as Cape Perpetua, Cape Blanco and Cape Arago. Likewise, each region has its own distinct draws in addition to those found throughout the state, such as the Astoria Column in Astoria, the Oregon Coast Aquarium in Newport, and Mount Emily outside Brookings. The South Coast's commercial airport is the Southwest Oregon Regional Airport in North Bend and the Central Coast is served by the Newport Municipal Airport.

=== Beaches ===
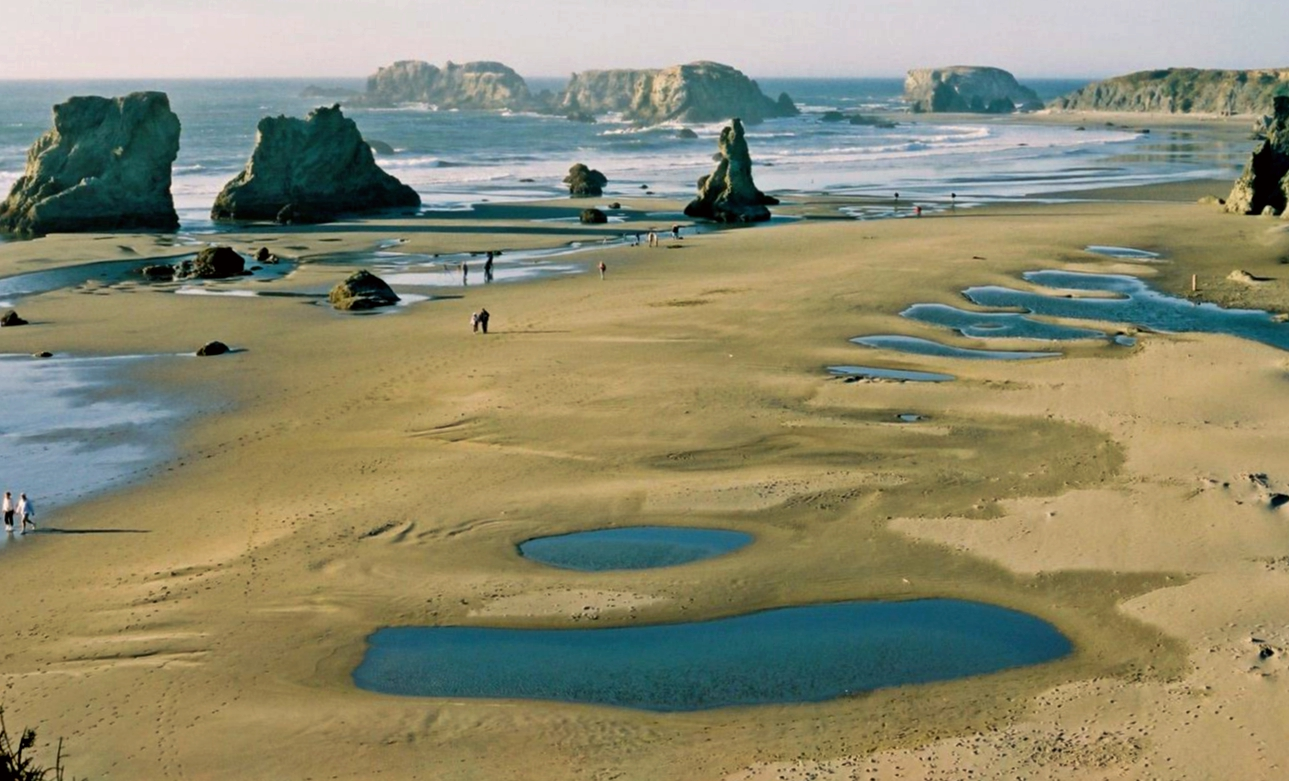
Bandon Beach

Oregon's beaches are popular destinations for visitors. Horse riding, clam digging, and surfing are popular activities. Certain beaches are host to events such as Seaside's Beach Volleyball Tournament and finish for the Hood to Coast race or Lincoln City's glass float hunt. Because of many headlands along the Oregon Coast, beaches vary in length from dozens of miles to less than a quarter of a mile. Though less common, surf fishing also occurs along sections of the beach. However, not all Oregon beaches are sand beaches. Large surf-smoothed stones are common and several stone beaches exist. Some beaches are also shrinking, due partially to human interactions and partly to invasive species of plant such as European Beachgrass.

=== Lighthouses ===
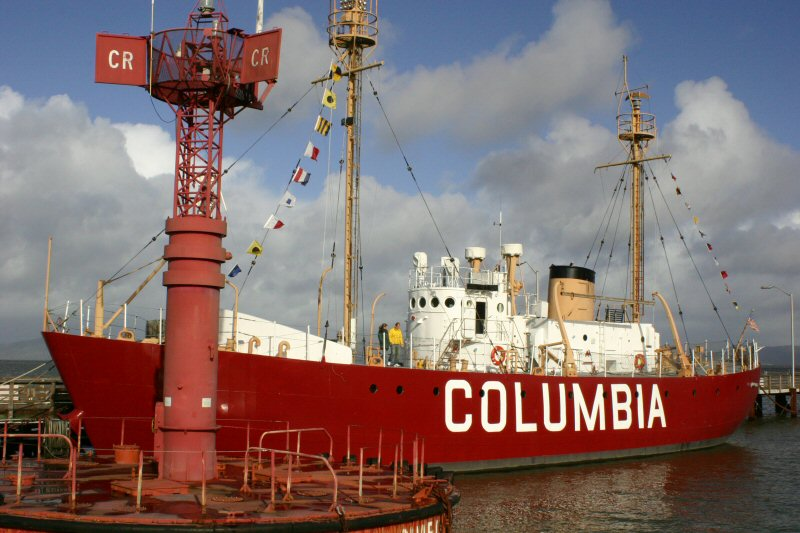
U.S. Lightship Columbia (WLV-604)

Another popular destination for visitors is Oregon's historic lighthouses, most of which date to before 1900. Because the Oregon and Washington coasts have been traditionally thought of as some of the most dangerous seas in the world, several lighthouses and a lightship were commissioned to aid sailors in navigating. Of the original 12 lights, nine are still in use. However, in recent years, two private lights, Pelican Bay Light and Cleft of the Rock Light have been built, with permission from the Coast Guard. Both lights, along with Cape Arago Light, are private property.

=== Outdoor activities ===
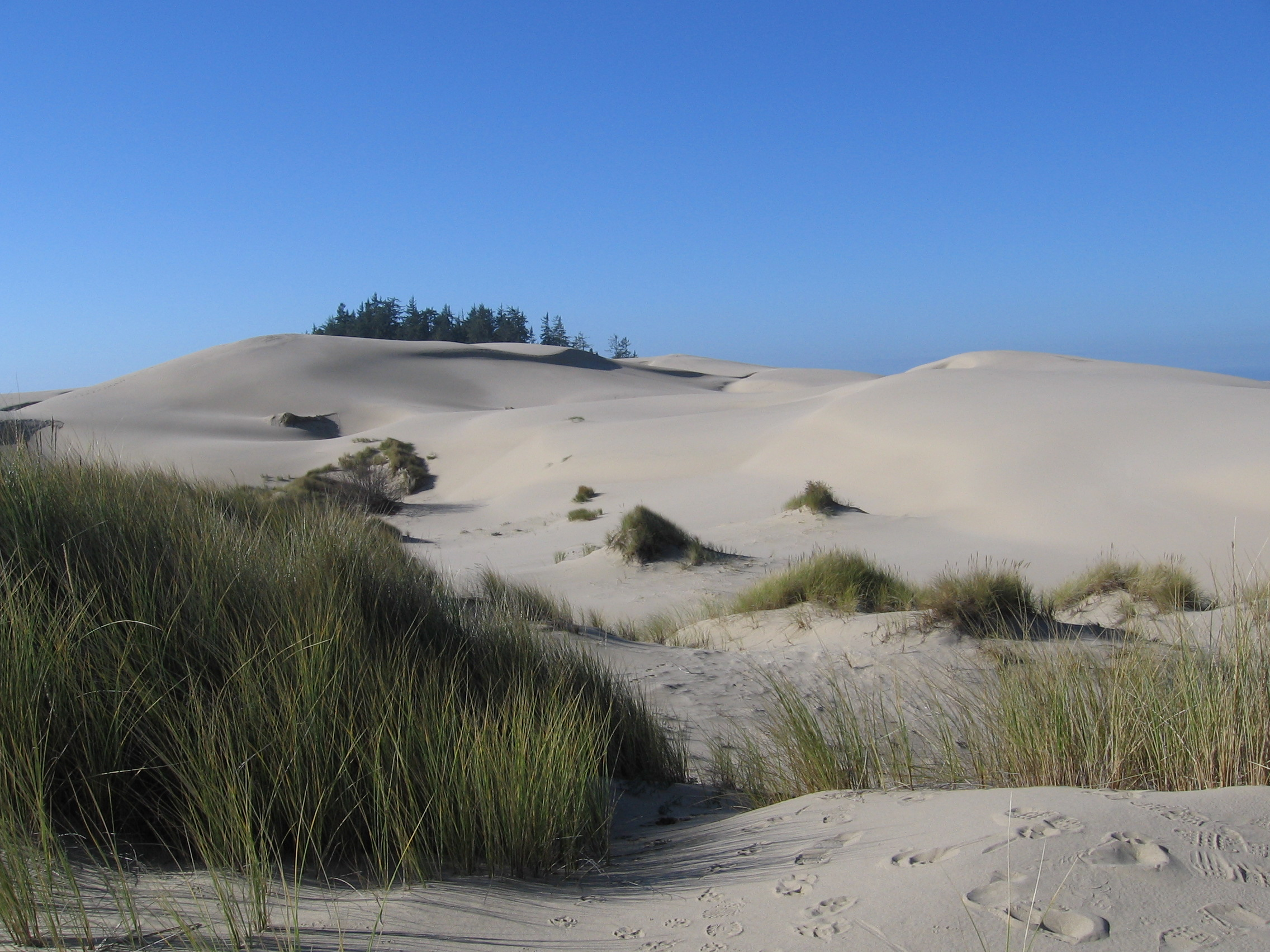
Oregon Dunes National Recreation Area

The Oregon Coast is also host to many recreational activities. Hiking, camping, sport fishing, and cycling are the most common activities and are ubiquitous to the Oregon Coast. Sport fishing has traditionally been the primary outdoor recreational activity along the Oregon Coast, and is a major industry in several of Oregon's port cities, especially Astoria, Newport, and Coos Bay. Because of this, Oregon has strict regulations concerning the harvest of fish for sport. Charter boats usually take groups out for half day and full day fishing trips for Chinook salmon, Coho salmon, and Pacific halibut.

However, several other activities, many of which are more local than others, take place throughout the coast region of the state, several of which occur in the Oregon Dunes National Recreation Area. Most common are All-terrain vehicles and sandboarding. Many equipment rental and specialty shops exist to cater to these activities. Horse riding is also a common pastime along many beaches and dunes along the coast, and several horse trails exist in the nearby forests.

Surfing and bodyboarding are also common sports along the beaches of the Oregon Coast. Both occur nearly year-round, regardless of weather or water temperature.

The coast is home to several excellent golf courses. Among them is the Bandon Dunes ranked by Golf Digest as the 6th best public golf course in the U.S in 2015/2016, up from 7th in 2009

=== Historic sites ===
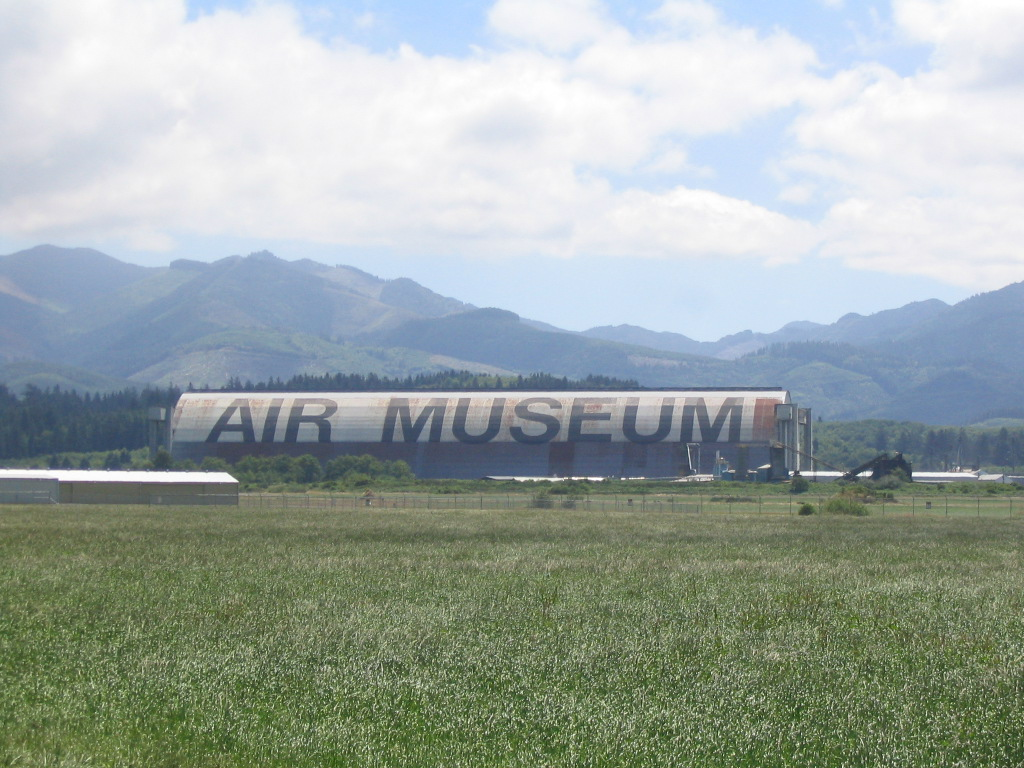
Tillamook Air Museum "Hangar B"

Many historical sites dot the Oregon Coast. The most prominent is that of Fort Clatsop outside of Astoria, which was the site of the Lewis and Clark Expeditions winter stay on the Oregon Coast in 1805–1806, as well as the nearby Peter Iredale which was grounded on the Clatsop Spit 100 years later in September 1906. However, over one hundred and twenty–one hundred and twenty-one years of deterioration have destroyed much of the original ship. Now only a small portion remains above the sand. Both are part of the Lewis and Clark National Historical Park along with Fort Stevens.

Further south outside Tillamook sits the Tillamook Air Museum, which is housed in one of the two former military blimp hangars of the former Naval Air Station Tillamook. The structure was originally known as "Hangar B" and was part of a pair of hangars built by the U.S. Navy in 1942. "Hangar A" was destroyed by a fire in 1992. However, the concrete pilings that held the massive hangar doors erect still stand.

Along the coast just south of Cape Arago are several parks that were formerly the location of early homesteaders, as well as the former Seven Devil's Trail. The homesteaders eventually abandoned their claims in favor of living closer to the nearby rural villages and towns. Today, nothing remains of these small farms and ranches, though several state parks mark their locations. However, south at Cape Blanco sits the Patrick Hughes House. The Hughes House is now a part of Cape Blanco State Park.

U.S. Coast Guard lifeboat at Port Orford Heads State Park

Located in Port Orford just south of Cape Blanco is the famous Battle Rock, which was the site of a major battle between local natives and members of an 1851 expedition led by Captain William Tichenor in order to begin railroad construction. Today, visitors can climb Battle Rock, though this is discouraged as frequent climbing has begun to erode the sandstone seastack. Also in Port Orford is the Port Orford Heads State Park, which is the location of the original Coast Guard lifeboat station. The station is now a museum for the historic station and maritime history, including the 1942 Lookout Air Raid.

Finally, Oregon has the distinction of being the only U.S. state (Hawaii and Alaska did not attain statehood until 1959) to receive hostile action during World War II, being both shelled and bombed.

The first attack, which took place the night of June 21, 1942, occurred at Fort Stevens when a Japanese submarine I-25 surfaced offshore, and fired 17 rounds at the fort. However, Fort Stevens took no damage in the attack. The second attack took place two and a half months later when the I-25 surfaced off Cape Blanco, the night of September 9, 1942. Launching a small "Glen" seaplane, and using the Cape Blanco Light as a guide, pilot Nobuo Fujita and copilot Okuda Shoji dropped a series of incendiary bombs in the forests at Mount Emily with the intention of starting several forest fires in the area. Though the fires did not become the major infernos that the Japanese intended, the bomb site is now on the National Register of Historic Places as the Wheeler Ridge Japanese Bombing Site. Fujita returned in 1962 and gave his family's 400-year-old sword to the city of Brookings. He was made an honorary citizen of Brookings days before his death in September 1997. His sword is now on display at the Brookings Public Library.

== Economy ==
The coast is Oregon's top tourist destination. In the mid-1980s, the coast's economy was dependent on natural resources. Limits placed on logging and fishing caused further decline. As of the late 2000s, tourism and retirement have provided economic growth. As of 2006, roughly 210,000 people live on the Oregon Coast. The economy is still dependent on natural resources, but the largest contributions to personal income are retirement based and "unidentified". The top three industries are timber, fishing, and tourism. The coast is poorer than the state average, with average income per capita $24,112 vs. $32,812.

== Gallery ==
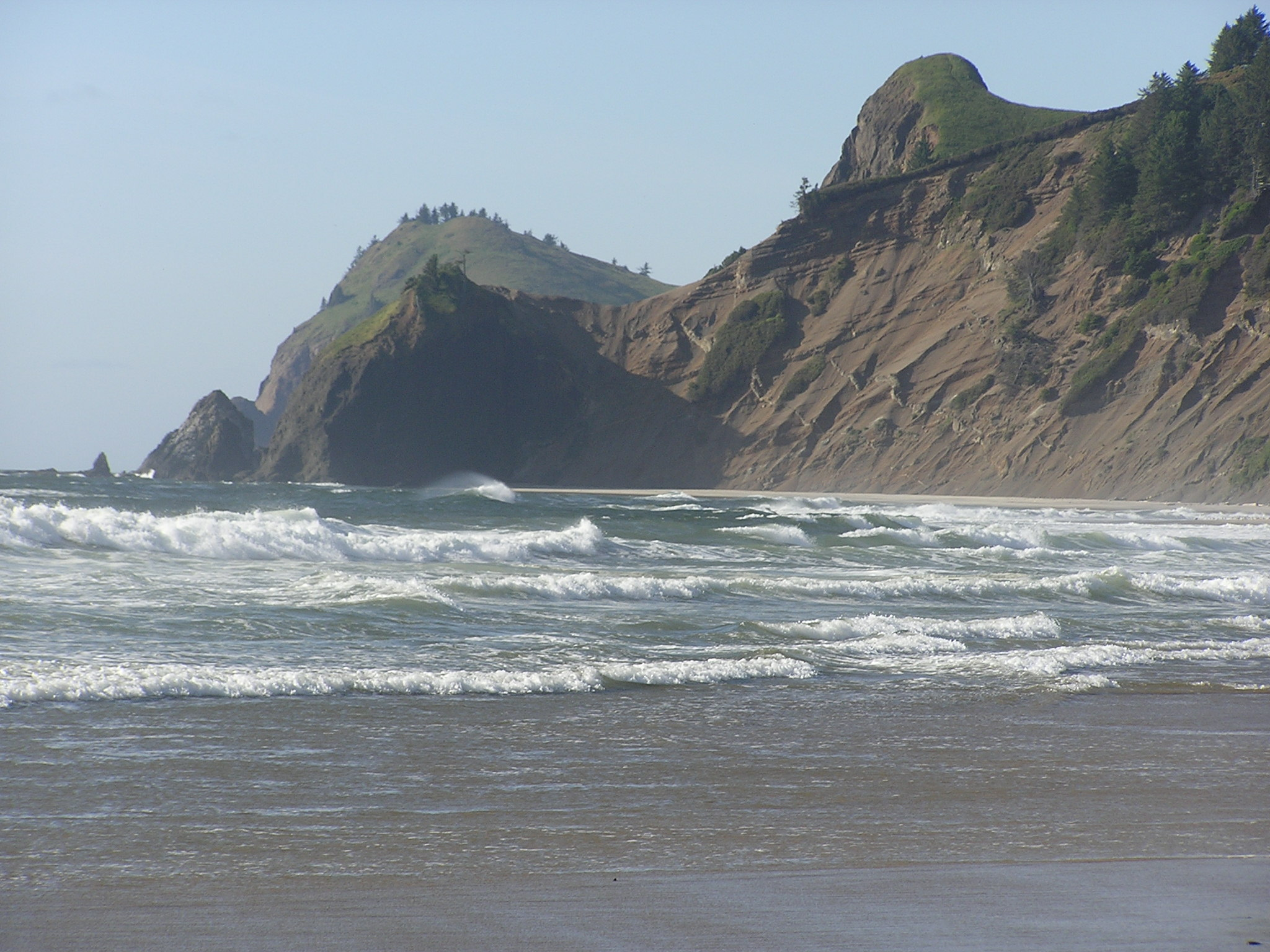
Roads End State Recreation Site, Lincoln City

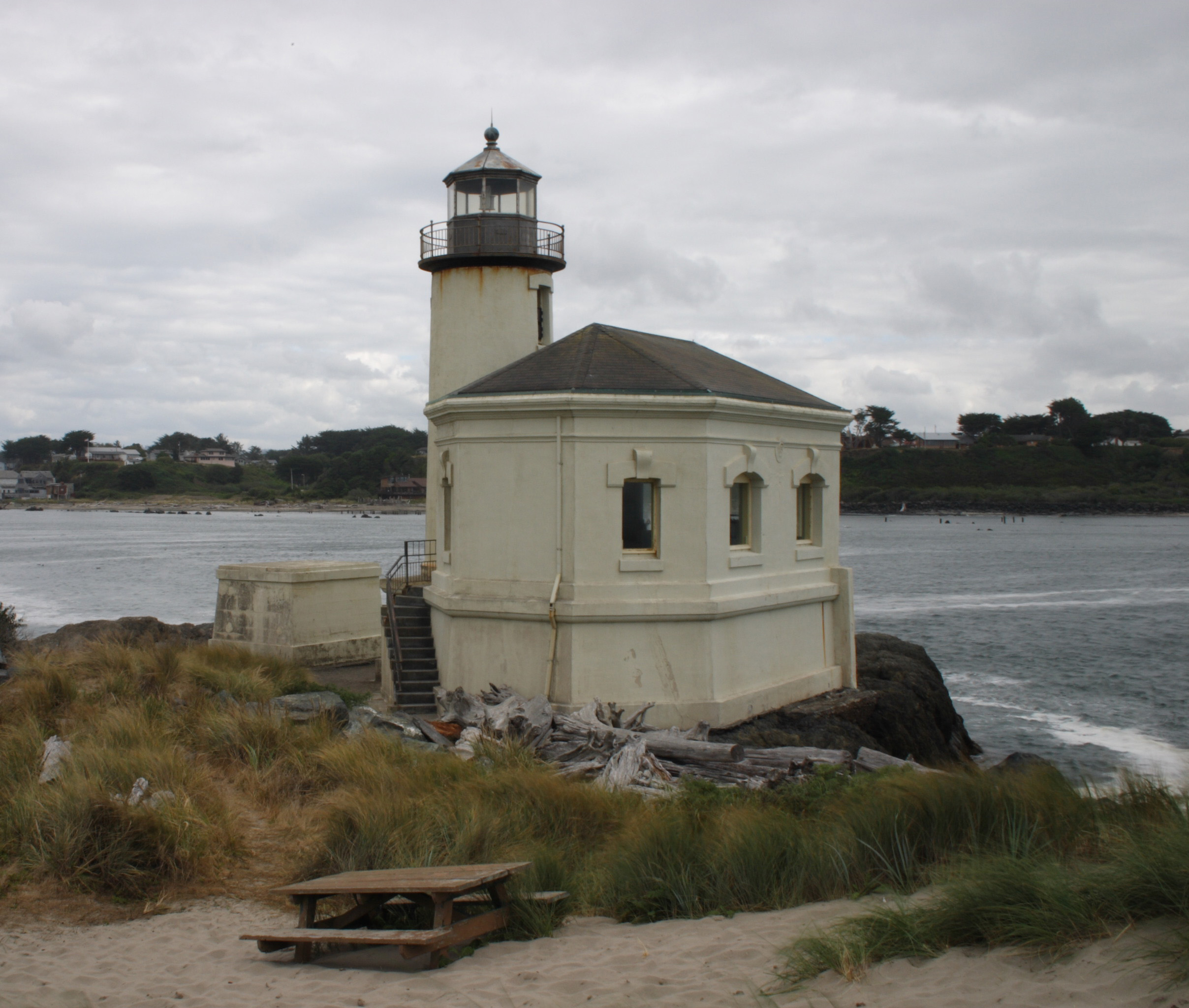
Coquille River Light

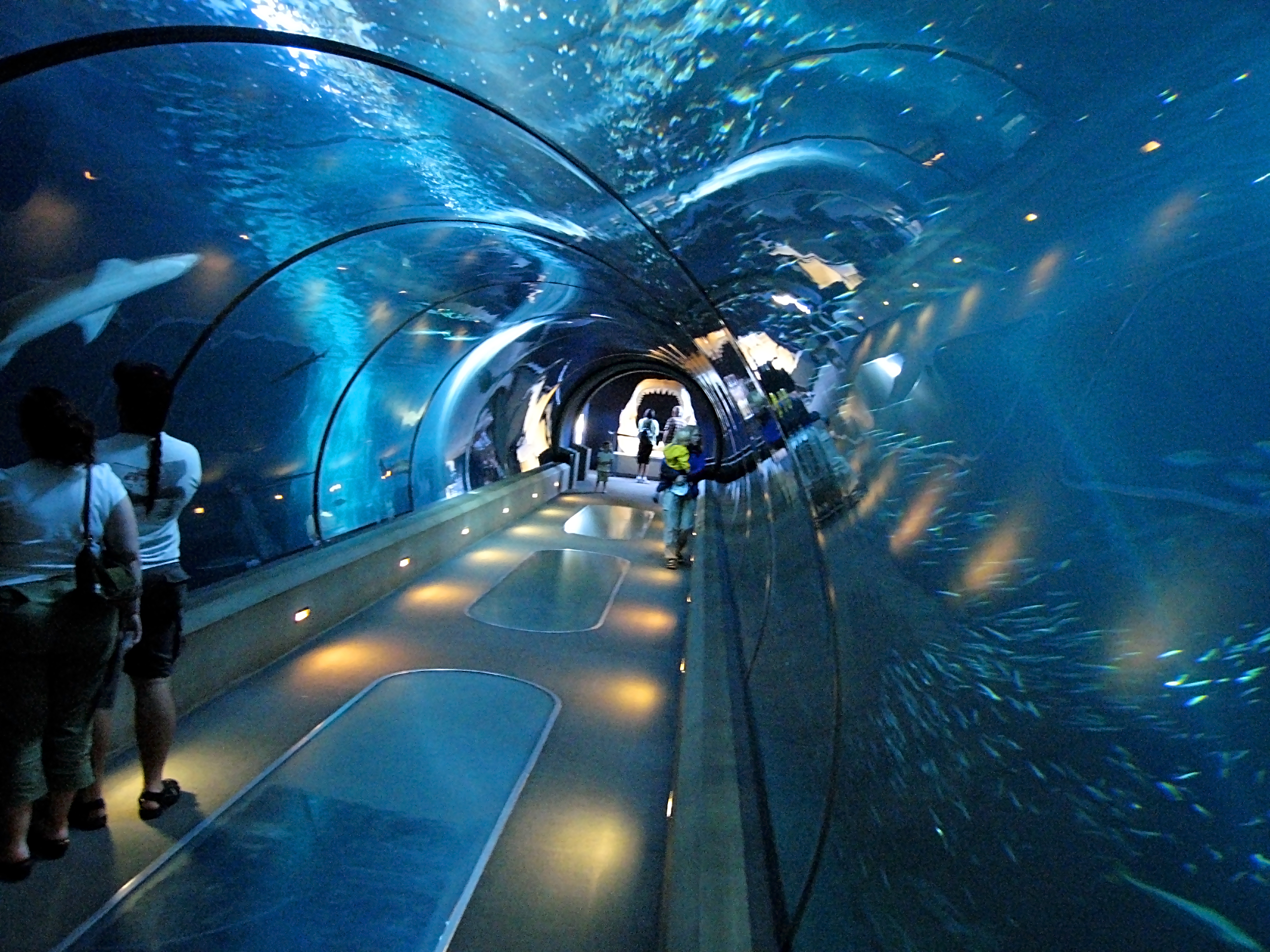
Viewing tunnel at Oregon Coast Aquarium

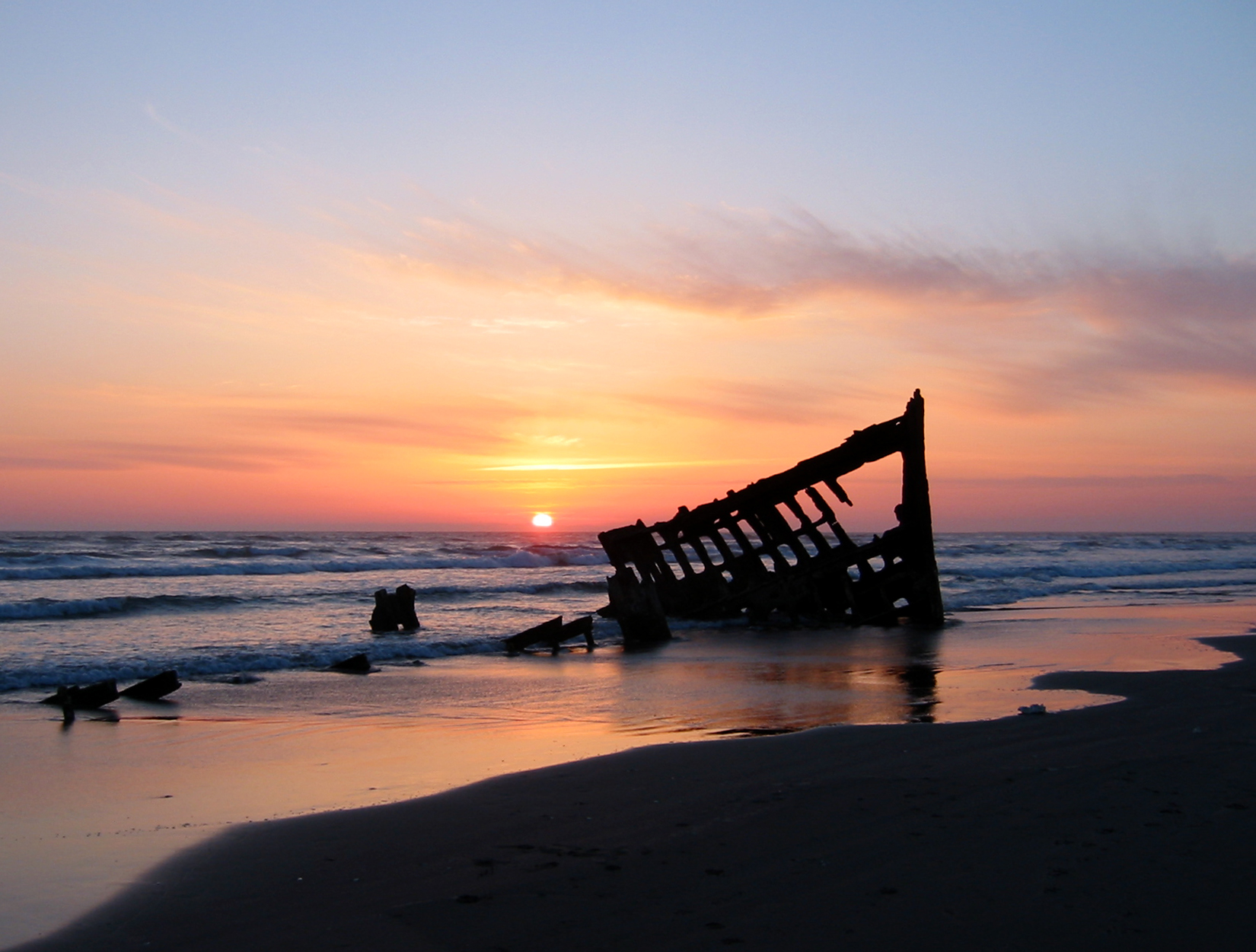
Remains of the Peter Iredale

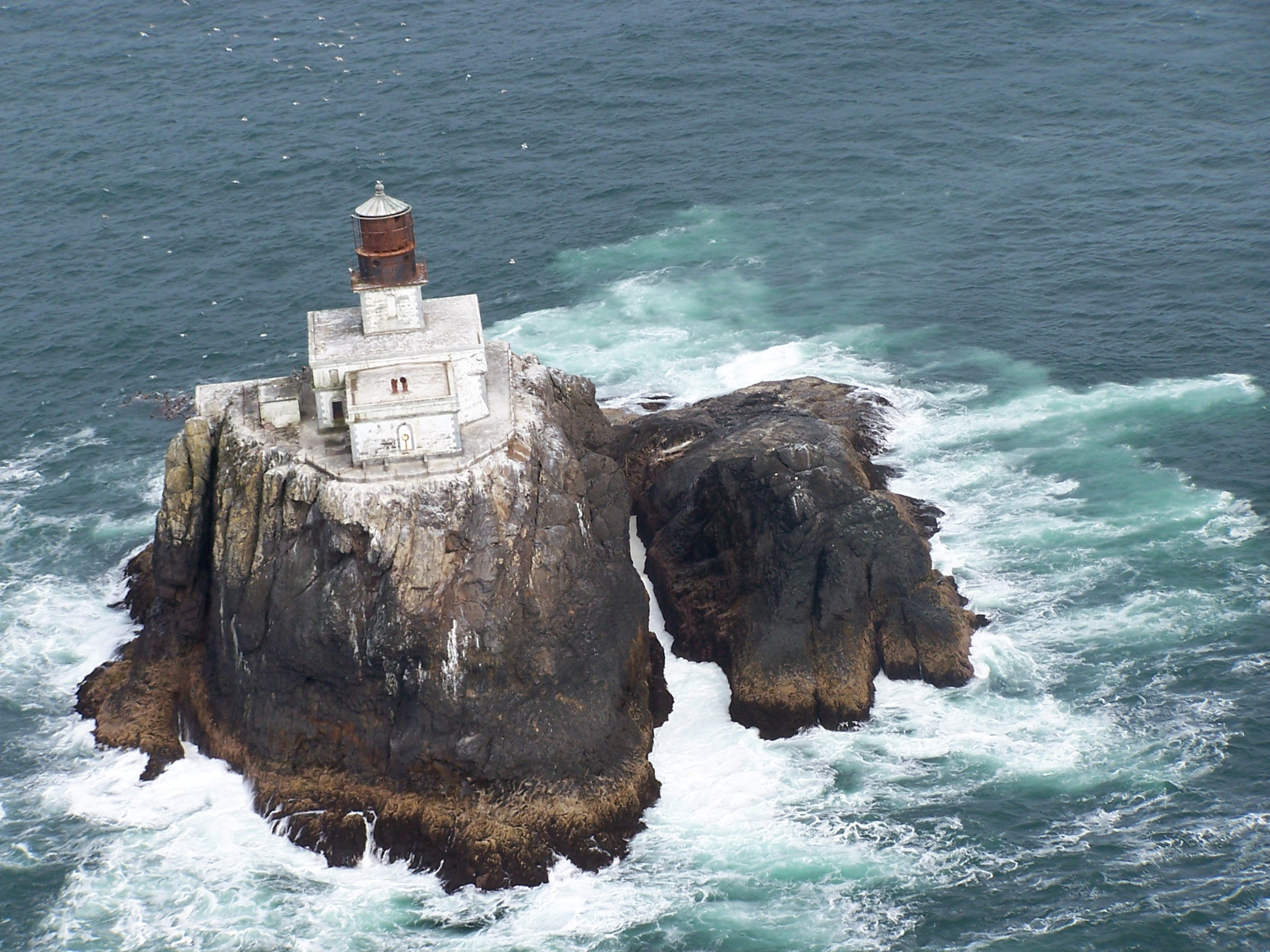
Tillamook Rock Light A.K.A. Terrible Tilly

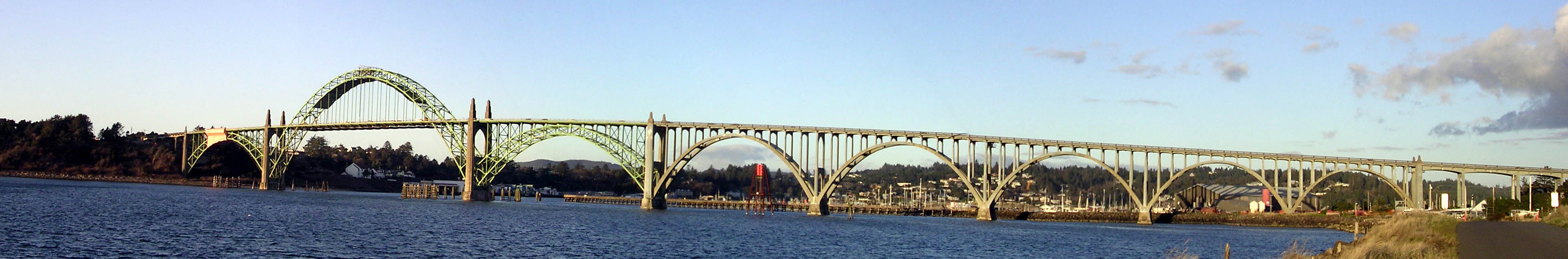
Yaquina Bay Bridge

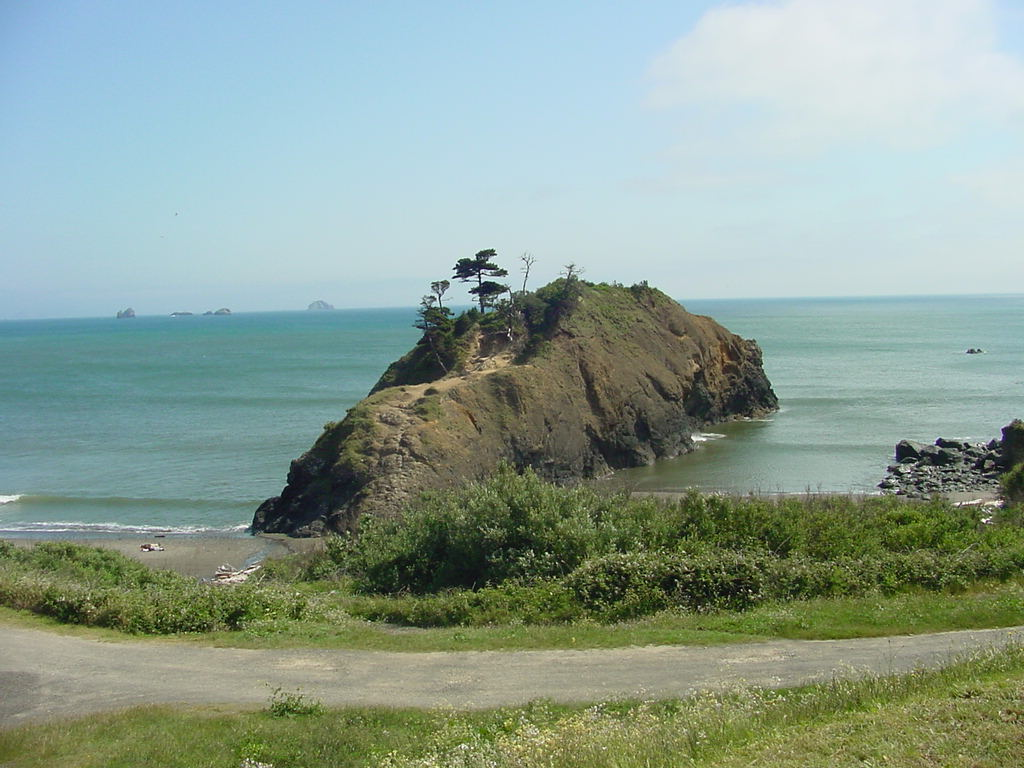
Battle Rock, Port Orford

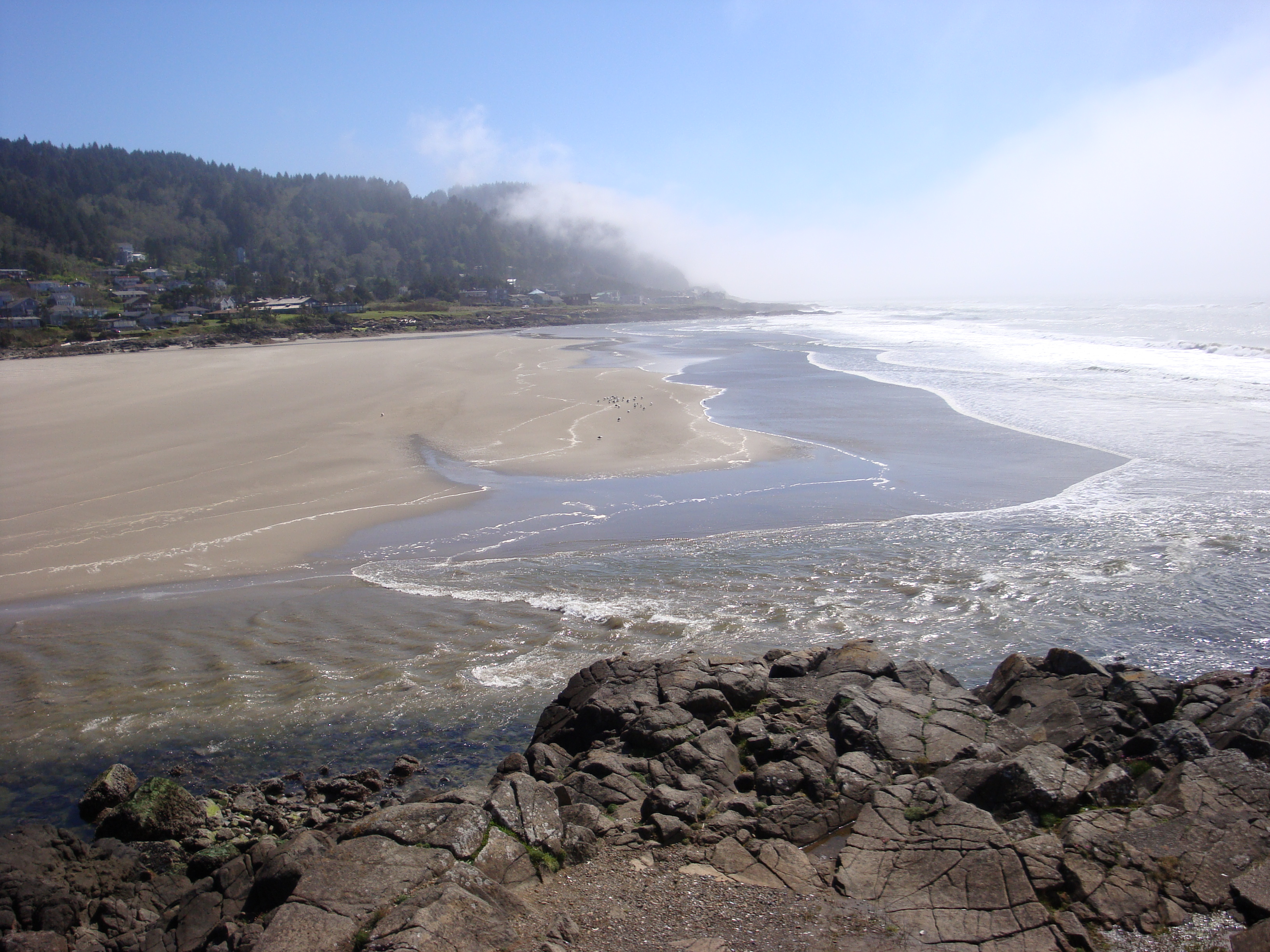
Beach and estuary at Yachats

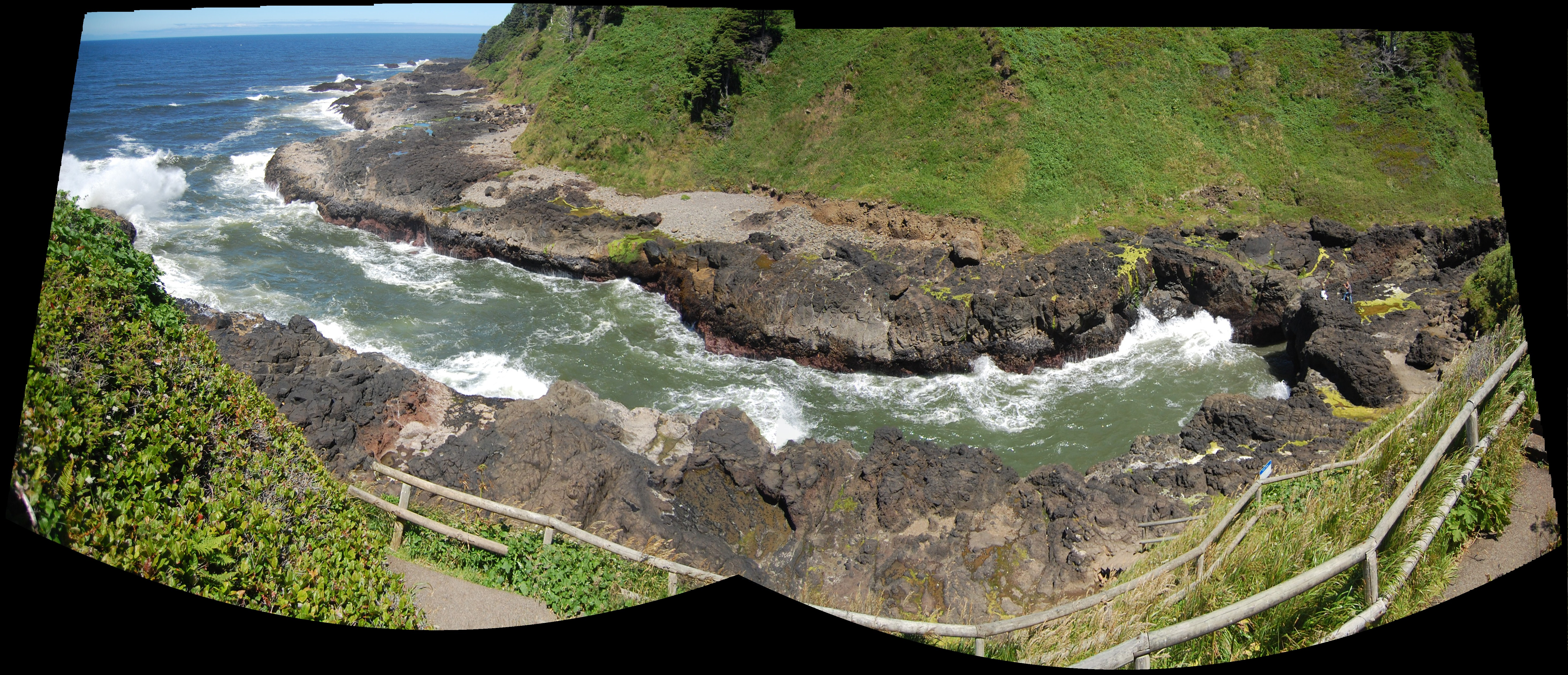
Devil's Churn, near Cape Perpetua, south of Yachats

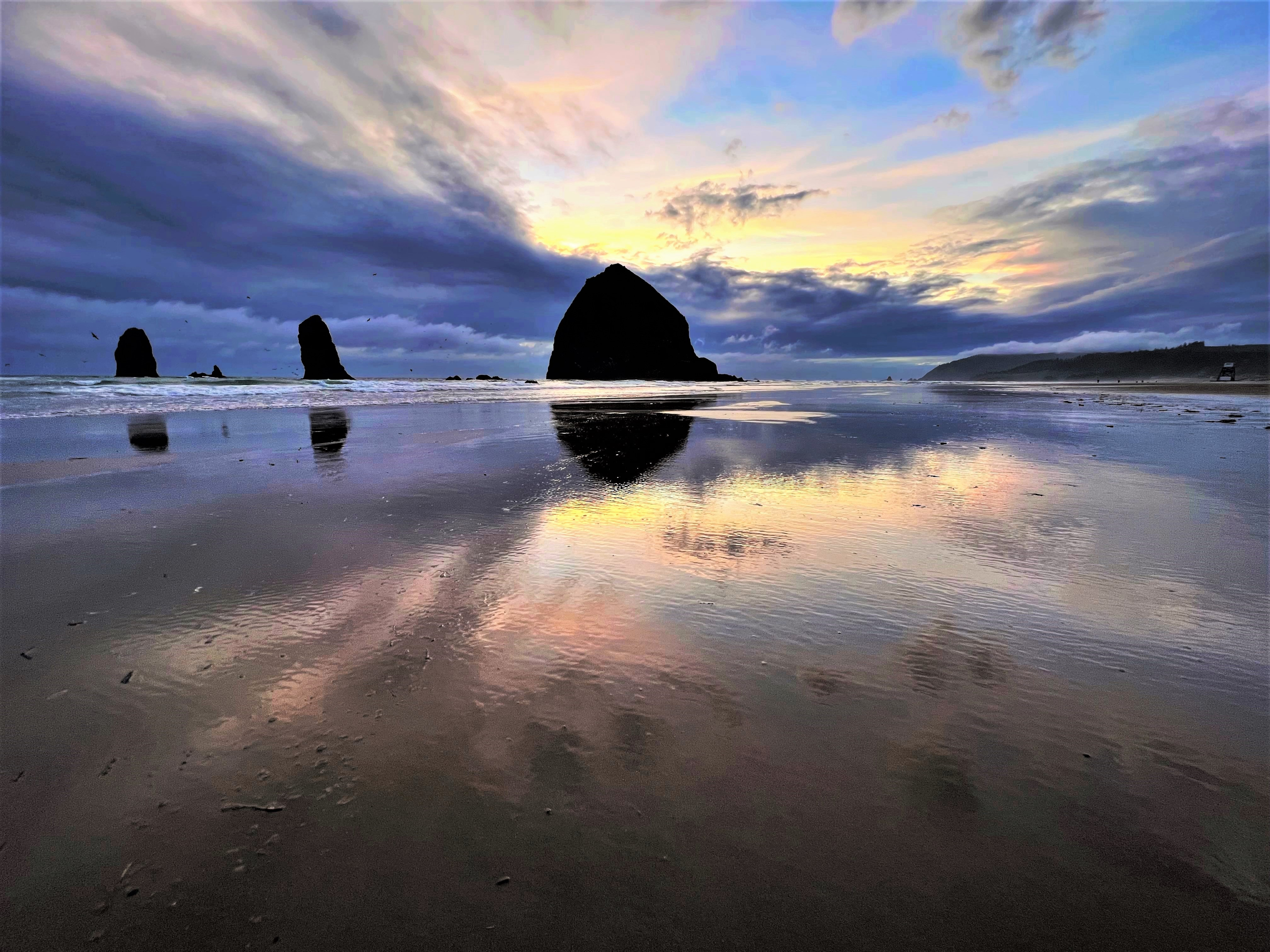
Dusk at Cannon Beach

== See also ==
- List of bridges on the Oregon Coast
- List of Oregon shipwrecks
- Oregon Coast Trail
- Steamboats of the Oregon Coast
