= Tierra Del Mar, Oregon =

Unincorporated community in the state of Oregon, United States

Tierra del Mar
- Unincorporated community
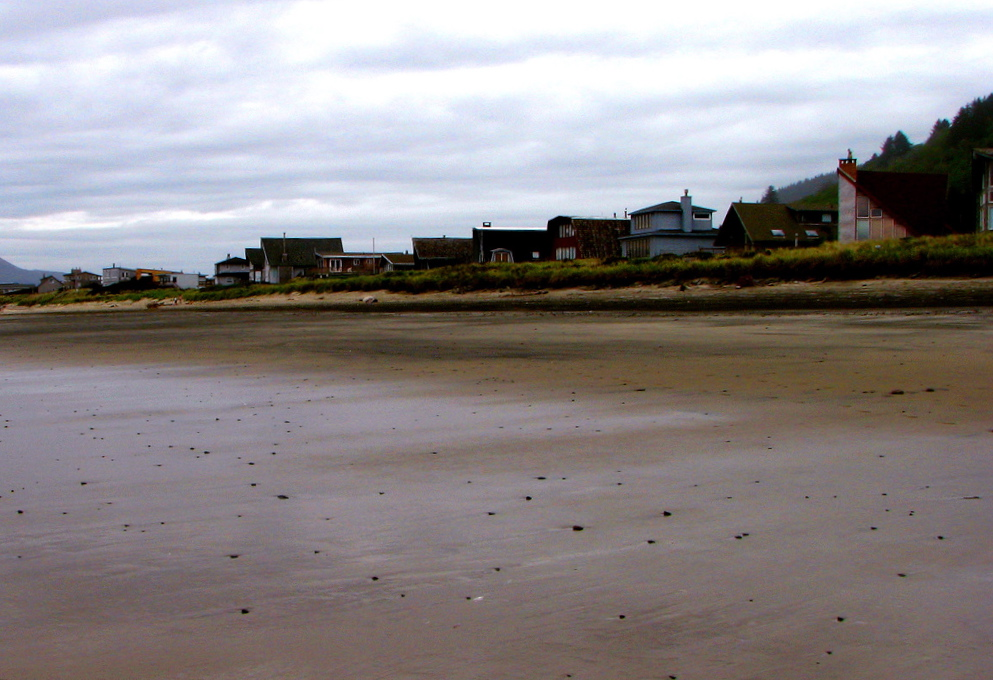
- Houses in Tierra del Mar

- Location within the state of Oregon Tierra del Mar (the United States)
- Coordinates: 45°15′07″N 123°57′52″W
- Country: United States
- State: Oregon
- County: Tillamook
- Established: 1935
- Elevation: 16 ft (4.9 m)
- Time zone: UTC-8 (Pacific (PST))
  - Summer (DST): UTC-7 (PDT)
- ZIP codes: 97112
- GNIS feature ID: 1639337

Tierra del Mar is an unincorporated community in Tillamook County, Oregon, United States, located on the Oregon Coast, about 25 miles (40 km) south of Tillamook and 4 miles (6.4 km) north of Pacific City and Cape Kiwanda, along Sandlake Road, west of U.S. Route 101.

== History ==
The community was named by Marie F. Pollock, who began selling lots in the development in 1935. Tierra del mar is Spanish for "land by the sea". One of the streets in the community is named after Pollock.

In 1990, author Ralph Friedman described Tierra del Mar as a "growing toss of houses".

=== Projected location of Facebook submarine cable ===
Beginning in 2019, Tierra del Mar residents voiced opposition to Facebook subsidiary Edge Cable Holdings, USA's planned transpacific cable crossing to Asia, known as the JUPITER Cable System. Tillamook County approved the plan in January 2020.

According to Facebook, Tierra del Mar is a likely site for a new branch of a fibre optic undersea telecommunications cable. Facebook's data center in Prineville, Oregon, could be connected more easily with Japan and the Philippines with the cable. The cable is to be wholly owned by Facebook and will split off from the 60 Tbps JUPITER cable that has its main branch ashore in Hermosa Beach, California and is owned by telecommunication firms in the Philippines (PLDT), Hong Kong (PCCW Global), and Japan (NTT, which is building the JUPITER cable system) as well as SoftBank Telecommunications, Amazon, and Facebook. Edge Cable Holdings, USA, purchased a beachfront property about the size of 10 tennis courts for $495,000 from former University of Oregon football player Joey Harrington in 2018. From Tierra del Mar, the submarine cable, once ashore, could connect underground with another cable in Pacific City.

On April 28, 2020, the drill hit an unexpected area of hard rock. The drill bit seized and the drill pipe snapped 50 feet below the seafloor. The crew was able to recover some of the equipment, but left the rest in the hole. Some 1,100 feet (340 m) of pipe, the drill head, and 6,500 US gallons (25,000 L) of drilling fluid remain in the hole. Facebook has no plans to retrieve the equipment. Edge Cable Holdings notified the county of the accident on 5 May, but did not explicitly mention the abandoned equipment. That information emerged at a meeting with state officials on June 17.

== See also ==
- List of international submarine communications cables
- Sitka Sedge State Natural Area
