= Oregon Beach Bill =

Law establishing public access to beaches in Oregon, United States

The Oregon Beach Bill (House Bill 1601, 1967) was a piece of landmark legislation in the U.S. state of Oregon, passed by the 1967 session of the Oregon Legislature. It established public ownership of land along the Oregon Coast from the water up to sixteen vertical feet above the low tide mark.

== Background ==
After Oregon achieved statehood in 1859, the completion of railroads through the Coast Range mountains encouraged land development along the ocean shore. In 1874, the Oregon State Land Board began selling public tidelands to private landowners. Resorts grew up around the beaches at Seaside, Newport, and Rockaway, and the newly completed railroads brought tourists from the population centers of the Willamette Valley for weekend vacations. By 1901, about 23 miles (37 km) of tideland had been sold.

In 1911, governor Oswald West was elected on the promise to reclaim Oregon's beaches as public land. The legislature favored the privatization of these lands, but West was able to make an argument for public ownership based on the need for transportation. The 1913 legislature declared the entire length of the ocean shore from Washington to California as a state highway. Legislators also created the State Highway Commission, which began the construction of Highway 101. The Parks and Recreation Department, a branch of the highway commission, bought land for 36 state parks along the coastal highway, an average of one every 10 miles (16 km). With the completion of the highway and parks system, coastal tourism skyrocketed.

== History ==
Oregon's public lands claim was challenged in 1966, when Cannon Beach motel owner William Hay fenced some dry sands above the high tide line and reserved it for private use. After citizens complained to the state government, state legislators put forward the Oregon Beach Bill, modeled on the Texas Open Beaches Act. Conservative Republicans and coastal developers called the bill a threat to private property rights, and it nearly died in the legislature. In response, Republican Governor Tom McCall staged a dramatic media event on May 13, 1967, flying two helicopters to the beach with a team of surveyors and scientists. The ensuing media coverage resulted in overwhelming public demand for the bill. The bill was passed by the legislature in June and signed by McCall on July 6, 1967.

The Beach Bill declares that all "wet sand" within sixteen vertical feet of the low tide line belongs to the state of Oregon. In addition, it recognizes public easements of all beach areas up to the line of vegetation, regardless of underlying property rights. The public has "free and uninterrupted use of the beaches," and property owners are required to seek state permits for building and other uses of the ocean shore. While some parts of the beach remain privately owned, state and federal courts have upheld Oregon’s right to regulate development of those lands and preserve public access.

In 2013, OPB released an episode of their The Oregon Experience television docu-series on the bill, which features the legislators involved in creating the bill, journalists who covered its development in 1967, and archival footage of Oregon beach history.

In 2017, Oregon celebrated the 50th anniversary of the Beach Bill's passing.

== See also ==
- Land use in Oregon
- Texas Open Beaches Act
- Willamette Greenway – another public access initiative proposed in 1966
