= Sandlake, Oregon =

Unincorporated community in the state of Oregon, United States

Sandlake
- Unincorporated community
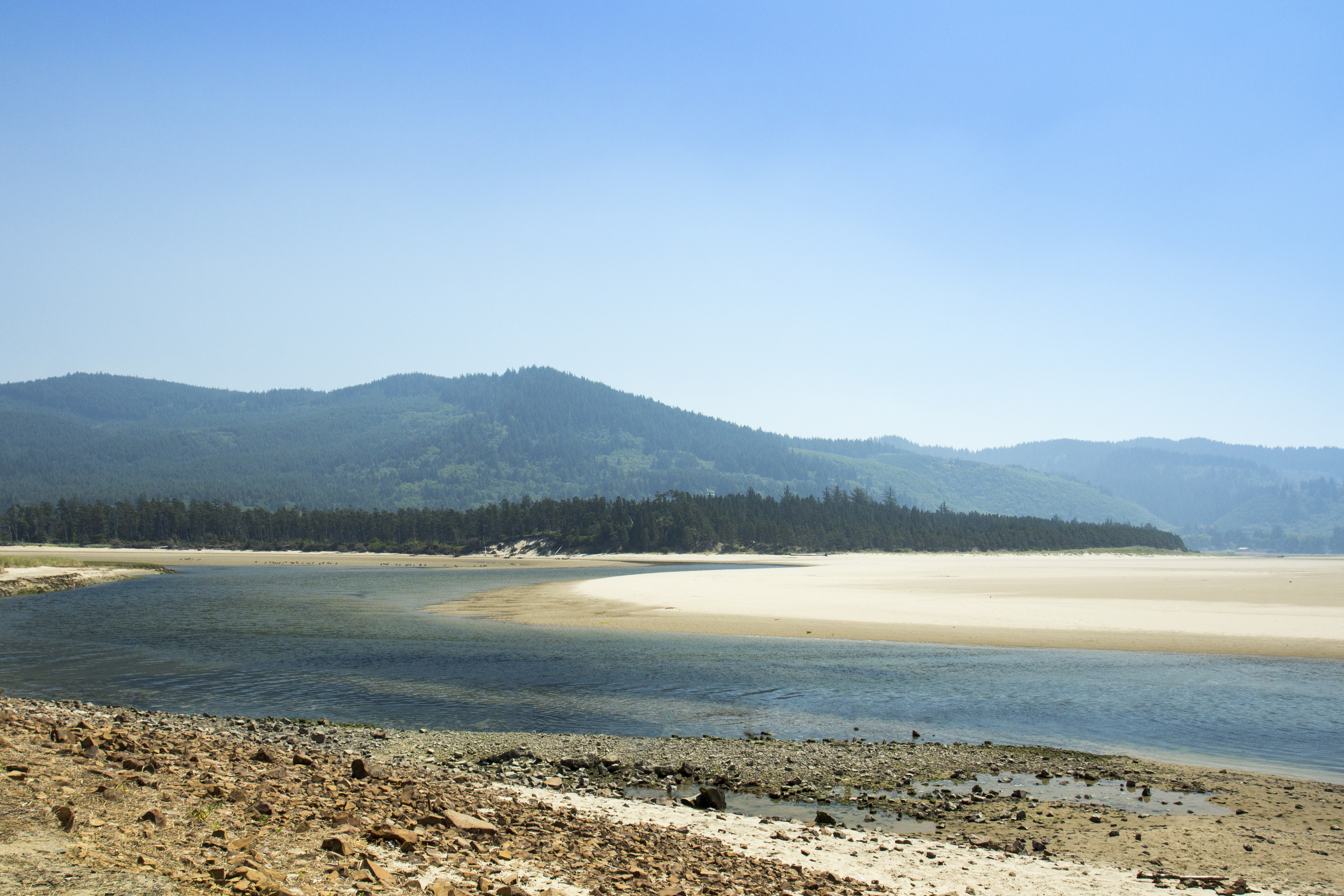
- The eponymous lake

- Location within Oregon Location within the United States
- Coordinates: 45°18′11″N 123°55′24″W
- Country: United States
- State: Oregon
- County: Tillamook
- Elevation: 30 ft (9.1 m)
- Time zone: UTC-8 (Pacific (PST))
  - Summer (DST): UTC-7 (PDT)
- Area code: 503
- GNIS feature ID: 1149049
- Coordinates and elevation from Geographic Names Information System

Sandlake is an unincorporated community in Tillamook County, Oregon, United States. It lies between Tillamook and Pacific City along Sandlake Road west of U.S. Route 101.

The community is named after a nearby body of water called Sand Lake along the Pacific coast. Postal authorities established a post office at this location on July 10, 1890, naming it Hembree after the first postmaster, A. J. Hembree. It was renamed Sandlake on January 18, 1898. The office remained open until May 1956.
