= Tidelands =

U.S. public land and property law

Tidelands are the territory between the tide line of sea coasts and lands lying under the sea beyond the low-water limit of the tide, considered within the territorial waters of a nation.

In the United States, the upper limit of tidelands is determined by the mean high tide as established by a chart datum, defined as a 19-year period based on the lunar cycle known as the National Tidal Datum Epoch.

The United States Constitution does not specify whether ownership of tidelands rests with the federal government or the individual states. Originally little commercial value was attached to tidelands, so ownership was never firmly established, but the coastal states generally proceeded as if they were the owners. Some states, such as Mississippi, directly administer these lands under the public trust doctrine.

The question arose for federal nations whether the tidelands for formerly independent coastal states had been ceded to the federal union on admission, or retained. The admission of the former Republic of Texas as a state in the United States in 1845 stipulated that its tidelands remained the territory of Texas. This has been an issue for oil and natural gas leases and federally funded development that affects such tidelands.

For other states that were formerly independent, such as the Thirteen Colonies, there was no explicit retention of state sovereignty and the states lay claim to the lands under the public trust doctrine; the federal government has also asserted elements of sovereignty over their tidelands in such areas as safe navigation and national defense.

== 20th century issues ==
The value of tidelands increased when it became known that vast oil and natural gas deposits lay within their limits and that modern technology made retrieval of these minerals commercially profitable. The first offshore oil well in the Gulf of Mexico began production in 1938 in shallow water one mile (1.6 km) off the Louisiana coast; in 1947, a second well began to operate off the coast of Terrebonne Parish, also in Louisiana.

The petroleum extraction-related United States v. California was filed by the Federal government against California in 1946 over rights to submerged lands and minerals underlying the Pacific Ocean seaward of the low water mark on the California coast. In 1947 the Supreme Court of the United States held in the federal government's favor, but acknowledged California's rights to low and inland waters. The decision resulted in the loss (partially reversed in 1953) of many millions of dollars in taxes and leasing fees by the states. The states whose tidelands were thought to contain valuable minerals objected strongly to the decision.

The issue became important in the 1952 presidential campaign. The Republican candidate, Dwight D. Eisenhower, pledged legislation that would restore the tidelands to the states. Eisenhower won the election, and, in 1953, Congress passed two acts seeking to do so: the Submerged Lands Act extended state ownership to three geographical miles (almost exactly 3 nautical miles or 5.6 kilometres) from their actual coastline, or further if a state could establish the existence of a boundary in judicial proceedings. The Outer Continental Shelf Lands Act gave the United States paramount rights from the point where state ownership leaves off to the point where international waters begin.

The 1953 acts did not end all controversy, however. The Submerged Lands Act, in particular, was so badly drawn up that state taxes and leasing fees had to be put in escrow, pending final resolution of the numerous lawsuits that emerged. The Supreme Court finally decided the issue on 31 May 1960, when it ruled that Mississippi, Alabama, and Louisiana owned the rights to the offshore lands for a distance of three geographical miles (3 nautical miles or 5.6 kilometres), and Texas and Florida owned rights to tidelands within three marine leagues (9 nautical miles or 17 kilometres), from their coastline boundaries. In the case of Texas, the claim to special boundary limits had been recognized by Congress in the Treaty of Guadalupe Hidalgo of 1848, which ended the Mexican–American War. The ruling for Florida was based on congressional approval of Florida's claims when the state re-entered the Union after the American Civil War.

Although the other Gulf states objected to what they considered preferential treatment for Florida and Texas, no new legislation resulted. In 1963, the United States Department of Justice settled the last of the tidelands controversies by ruling that the 1953 act gave control to the states of islands near the shore that were created after the states had been admitted to the Union.

== See also ==
- Equal footing
- New Zealand foreshore and seabed controversy
- Offshore oil and gas in the United States
- Outer Continental Shelf
- Riparian zone
- Submerged Lands Act
- Territorial waters
- Waters of the United States

== Sources ==
- Bartly, Ernest R. The Tidelands Oil Controversy: A Legal and Historical Analysis. Austin: University of Texas Press, 1953.
- Galloway, Thomas D., ed. The Newest Federalism: A New Framework for Coastal Issues. Wakefield, R.I.: Times Press, 1982.
- Marshall, Hubert R., and Betty Zisk. The Federal-State Struggle for Offshore Oil. Indianapolis, Ind.: Published for the Inter-university Case Program by Bobbs-Merrill, 1966.
