= Channel 26 =

Channel 26 refers to several television stations:

- Canal 26 (Argentina), an Argentine news channel

== Canada ==
The following television stations operate on virtual channel 26 in Canada:

- CBUFT-DT in Vancouver, British Columbia
- CFTF-DT-10 in Baie-Saint-Paul, Quebec
- CHWI-DT-60 in Windsor, Ontario
- CICO-DT-53 in Belleville, Ontario

== See also ==
- Channel 26 virtual TV stations in Mexico
- Channel 26 virtual TV stations in the United States

For UHF frequencies covering 542-548 MHz

- Channel 26 TV stations in Canada
- Channel 26 TV stations in Mexico
- Channel 26 digital TV stations in the United States
- Channel 26 low-power TV stations in the United States
