= KTKB =

KTKB may refer to:

- KTKB-FM, a radio station (101.9 FM) licensed to Agana, Guam
- KTKB-LP, a low-power television station (channel 26) licensed to Tamuning, Guam
