= Fort Orford =

Former U.S. Army post in Oregon (1851–1856)

- Port Orford, Curry County, Oregon in the United States

Site information
- Type: United States Army post
- Controlled by: United States
- Condition: Site largely built over by modern development

Location
- Location within Oregon Location within the United States
- Coordinates: 42°44′45″N 124°29′46″W

Site history
- Built: 1851
- In use: September 14, 1851 – October 1856
- Materials: Cedar logs (with lumber shipped from San Francisco)
- Battles/wars: Rogue River Wars (as a regional headquarters during 1855–1856 hostilities)

Garrison information
- Past commanders: Powell T. Wyman; Horatio Gates Gibson; August V. Kautz

Fort Orford was a United States Army post at Port Orford, Oregon, on the southern Oregon Coast. Established on September 14, 1851, the post operated until it was evacuated in October 1856. It served as a military and administrative foothold during a period of rapid settler and mining influx into southwestern Oregon and northwestern California. Modern scholarship also situates the fort within the broader context of U.S. colonial expansion and violence against Native peoples on the southern Oregon coast.

== Location ==
The fort's former military reservation was located within the present town of Port Orford, west of U.S. Route 101 near the coastal cliff edge, between Battle Rock State Park and the town harbor.

== History ==
In response to increasing conflict associated with new settlement and mining movements in the region, the U.S. Army established Fort Orford as a garrison in 1851. Oregon Geographic Names reports the post's establishment date as September 14, 1851, and notes that an early reinforcement of troops was sent by sea later that year, including a detachment commanded by Lt. Col. Silas Casey. The fort's buildings were constructed from cedar logs along with milled lumber shipped from San Francisco.

The post functioned as a regional headquarters during the 1855–1856 hostilities on the southern Oregon coast (often grouped within the broader Rogue River Wars). A citizens’ blockhouse stood near the military establishment during this period.

The fort hosted what the Oregon coastal site inventory describes as the first hospital service and medical dispensary on the southern Oregon coast. Army surgeons associated with Fort Orford included Dr. John J. Milhau and Dr. Rodney Glisan, whose published diary Journal of Army Life is a well-known account of frontier military life in Oregon, with substantial portions written during his tenure at the post.

Fort Orford was evacuated in October 1856. According to the 1973 Oregon coastal site inventory, buildings from the post were removed in 1856–1857 and relocated to Fort Umpqua.

The military reservation was abandoned, and the fort site is now partially covered by private residences within Port Orford's street grid.

== Name confusion with a civilian “Fort Orford” ==
Sources note that, in addition to the U.S. Army post, there was an earlier civilian stockade with blockhouses also called “Fort Orford,” constructed by men associated with William Tichenor’s 1851 expeditions to Port Orford. This duplication of names has contributed to confusion in later references distinguishing the civilian fortifications from the Army post.

== See also ==
- Battle Rock
- Rogue River Wars
- Fort Umpqua
