= KDOV =

KDOV may refer to:

- The ICAO code for Dover Air Force Base
- KDOV (FM), a radio station (91.7) licensed to serve Medford, Oregon, United States
- KDOV-LD, a low-power television station (channel 18) licensed to serve Medford, Oregon
- KDSO-LD, a low-power television station (channel 24, virtual 16) licensed to serve Medford, Oregon, which held the call sign KDOV-LP from 2009 to 2018
