= Channel 26 low-power TV stations in the United States =

The following low-power television stations broadcast on digital or analog channel 26 in the United States:

- K26CI-D in Cortez, etc., Colorado
- K26CK-D in Cottonwood/Grangevil, Idaho
- K26CL-D in Alexandria, Minnesota
- K26CS-D in St. James, Minnesota
- K26CV-D in Ogallala, Nebraska
- K26DB-D in Astoria, Oregon
- K26DD-D in Kalispell, Montana
- K26DE-D in Bozeman, Montana
- K26DX-D in Raton, New Mexico
- K26EA-D in Milford, etc., Utah
- K26FM-D in Peetz, Colorado
- K26FP-D in Idalia, Colorado
- K26FQ-D in John Day, Oregon
- K26FT-D in Santa Barbara, California
- K26FV-D in La Grande, Oregon
- K26GF-D in Peach Springs, Arizona
- K26GG-D in Golconda, Nevada
- K26GL-D in Columbus, Montana
- K26GS-D in Harrison, Arkansas
- K26GV-D in Omak, Washington
- K26GX-D in Pleasant Valley, Colorado
- K26GY-D in Breckenridge, Colorado
- K26HO-D in Glide, Oregon
- K26HY-D in Ely, Nevada
- K26IC-D in Bremerton, Washington
- K26IH-D in Manti, etc., Utah
- K26IK-D in Heber & Midway, Utah
- K26IS-D in Woodward, etc., Oklahoma
- K26IT-D in Redstone, etc., Colorado
- K26JB-D in Wells, Nevada
- K26JC-D in Walker Lake, Nevada
- K26JI-D in Sibley, Iowa
- K26JN-D in Huntington, Utah
- K26JO-D in Guymon, Oklahoma
- K26JR-D in Turkey, Texas
- K26JY-D in Duckwater, Nevada
- K26KA-D in Drummond, Montana
- K26KC-D in Dallas, Texas
- K26KF-D in Duluth, Minnesota
- K26KG-D in Beowawe, Nevada
- K26KQ-D in Christmas Valley, Oregon
- K26LG-D in Phillips County, Montana
- K26LH-D in Snowmass Village, Colorado
- K26LJ-D in Coeur D'Alene, Idaho
- K26LM-D in Libby, Montana
- K26LQ-D in White Sulphur Springs, Montana
- K26LR-D in Helper, Utah
- K26LW-D in Sheridan, Wyoming
- K26MS-D in Collbran, Colorado
- K26MT-D in Paso Robles, California
- K26MV-D in Soldier Canyon, New Mexico
- K26MW-D in Lucerne Valley, California
- K26MZ-D in Cottage Grove, Oregon
- K26NB-D in Klamath Falls, Oregon
- K26NC-D in Elk City, Oklahoma
- K26ND-D in Hollis, Oklahoma
- K26NE-D in Florence, Oregon
- K26NF-D in Ellensburg, Washington
- K26NG-D in East Flagstaff, Arizona
- K26NJ-D in Powers, Oregon
- K26NK-D in Wichita Falls, Texas
- K26NL-D in Gillette, Wyoming
- K26NM-D in Pullman, Washington
- K26NN-D in Bridger, etc., Montana
- K26NP-D in Overton, Nevada
- K26NQ-D in Hood River, Oregon
- K26NS-D in Fort Peck, Montana
- K26NU-D in Willmar, Minnesota
- K26NV-D in Fishlake Resort, Utah
- K26NW-D in Marysvale, Utah
- K26NX-D in Madras, Oregon
- K26NY-D in Kanab, Utah
- K26NZ-D in Kanarraville/New Harmony, Utah
- K26OA-D in Parowan/Enoch/Paragonah, Utah
- K26OB-D in Fillmore, etc., Utah
- K26OC-D in Delta, Oak City, Utah
- K26OD-D in Globe, Arizona
- K26OE-D in Elko, Nevada
- K26OF-D in Roosevelt, Utah
- K26OH-D in Roseau, Minnesota
- K26OI-D in East Price, Utah
- K26OJ-D in Tucumcari, New Mexico
- K26OK-D in Lake Havasu City, Arizona
- K26OM-D in Shoshoni, Wyoming
- K26ON-D in Deer Lodge, etc., Montana
- K26OO-D in Bonners Ferry, Idaho
- K26OP-D in Holbrook, Idaho
- K26OS-D in Sapinero, Colorado
- K26OT-D in Akron, Colorado
- K26OV-D in Zuni, New Mexico
- K26OW-D in Garden Valley, Idaho
- K26OX-D in Colstrip, Montana
- K26OY-D in Malad City, Idaho
- K26OZ-D in Everett, Washington
- K26PA-D in Ardmore, Oklahoma
- K26PD-D in Scobey, Montana
- K26PF-D in Saint Cloud, Minnesota
- K26PG-D in Woody Creek, Colorado
- K26PI-D in Kansas City, Kansas
- K26PK-D in Nephi, Utah
- K26PL-D in Roswell, New Mexico
- K26PP-D in Santa Maria-Lompoc, California
- K26PQ-D in Oroville, California
- K26PR-D in Needles, California
- KCNH-LD in Springfield, Missouri
- KCPO-LD in Sioux Falls, South Dakota
- KCVB-CD in Logan, Utah
- KCYM-LD in Des Moines, Iowa
- KDJT-CD in Salinas/Monterey, etc., California
- KDRC-LD in Redding, California
- KENH-LD in Hot Springs, Arkansas
- KGNG-LD in Las Vegas, Nevada
- KLHO-LD in Oklahoma City, Oklahoma
- KLHP-LD in Dallas, Texas
- KLSO-LD in Lubbock, Texas
- KMRZ-LD in Pomona, California
- KNMW-LD in Mineral Wells, Texas
- KSKJ-CD in Van Nuys, California
- KTES-LD in Abilene, Texas
- KTKB-LD in Tamuning, Guam
- KTKV-LD in Twin Falls, Idaho
- KTVU (DRT) in San Jose, California
- KUCL-LD in Salt Lake City, Utah
- KUKR-LD in Santa Rosa, California
- KULC-LD in Port Arthur, Texas
- KVBC-LP in Reedley, California
- KVBT-LD in Santa Clara, etc., Utah
- KXTS-LD in Victoria, Texas
- KXUN-LD in Sallisaw, Oklahoma
- KYEX-LD in Juneau, Alaska
- KZBZ-CD in Clovis, New Mexico
- KZFC-LD in Windsor, Colorado
- KZGN-LD in Ridgecrest, California
- KZTE-LD in Fulton, Arkansas
- W26BB-D in Vicksburg, Mississippi
- W26BF-D in Elmira, New York
- W26CV-D in Mansfield, Pennsylvania
- W26DH-D in Auburn, Indiana
- W26DK-D in San Juan, Puerto Rico
- W26DP-D in Inverness, Florida
- W26EE-D in Wittenberg, Wisconsin
- W26EM-D in Athens, Georgia
- W26EQ-D in State College, Pennsylvania
- W26ET-D in Chattanooga, Tennessee
- W26EU-D in Boston, Massachusetts
- W26EV-D in Portsmouth, Virginia
- W26EW-D in Huntington, West Virginia
- W26EX-D in Jacksonville, Florida
- W26EY-D in Manteo, North Carolina
- W26FA-D in Marion, North Carolina
- W26FB-D in Canton/Waynesville, North Carolina
- W26FE-D in Montgomery, Alabama
- W26FG-D in Eau Claire, Wisconsin
- W26FJ-D in Valdosta, Georgia
- W26FM-D in Glasgow, Kentucky
- WARZ-LD in Smithfield, North Carolina
- WCSN-LD in Columbus, Ohio
- WDID-LD in Savannah, Georgia
- WDMI-LD in Minneapolis, Minnesota
- WDRJ-LD in Albany, Georgia
- WEDS-LD in Mobile, Alabama
- WEKA-LD in Canton, Ohio
- WGCE-CD in Rochester, New York
- WGVT-LD in Gainesville, Florida
- WHDN-CD in Naples, Florida
- WHEH-LD in Lumberton, North Carolina
- WISH-TV (DRT) in Indianapolis, Indiana
- WIVD-LD in Newcomerstown, Ohio
- WIYE-LD in Parkersburg, West Virginia
- WJAC-TV in Du Bois, Pennsylvania
- WLVO-LD in Cumming, Georgia
- WMPJ-LD in Calhoun City, Mississippi
- WMTW in Portland, Maine
- WNGF-LD in Potsdam, New York
- WNTU-LD in Nashville, Tennessee
- WOHW-LD in Lima, Ohio
- WOSC-CD in Pittsburgh, Pennsylvania
- WPVN-CD in Chicago, Illinois
- WQAV-CD in Glassboro, New Jersey
- WRDE-LD in Salisbury, Maryland
- WROB-LD in Topeka, Kansas
- WRUG-LD in Baton Rouge, Louisiana
- WSNN-LD in Sarasota, Florida
- WTGC-LD in New Bern, North Carolina
- WTSJ-LD in Milwaukee, Wisconsin
- WXAX-CD in Clearwater, Florida
- WYBN-LD in Cobleskill, New York
- WYBU-CD in Columbus, Georgia
- WYCU-LD in Charlestown, etc., New Hampshire
- WYLN-LP in Hazleton, Pennsylvania
- WZEO-LD in La Crosse, Wisconsin

The following low-power stations, which are no longer licensed, formerly broadcast on digital or analog channel 26:

- K26DK in Rock Springs, Wyoming
- K26EH-D in Austin, Nevada
- K26EM in Orangeville, Utah
- K26EP in Dulce/Lumberton, New Mexico
- K26FK in Rulison, Colorado
- K26FS in Blythe, California
- K26GI in Woodland & Kamas, Utah
- K26GK in Lakeport, California
- K26HL in Holualoa, Hawaii
- K26HS-D in Tillamook, Oregon
- K26KM-D in Orr, Minnesota
- K26NR-D in Rainier, Oregon
- K26NT-D in Granite Falls, Minnesota
- K26PH-D in Clarks Fork, Wyoming
- KDLU-LP in St. George, Utah
- KFWY-LD in Cheyenne, Wyoming
- KGKY-LD in Joplin, Missouri
- KSWX-LD in Duncan, Oklahoma
- KSXC-LD in South Sioux City, Nebraska
- W26BV in Panama City, Florida
- W26BZ in Victor, New York
- W26CE in New York, New York
- W26CQ in Colebrook, New Hampshire
- W26DC-D in Hempstead, New York
- W26DS-D in La Grange, Georgia
- WDRL-LD in Wilmington, North Carolina
- WEDD-LD in Roanoke, Virginia
- WEYB-LD in Montgomery, Alabama
- WLPC-LP in Detroit, Michigan
- WMUN-LP in Muncie, Indiana
- WYXN-LD in New York, New York
