= KGEC =

KGEC may refer to:

- Kalyani Government Engineering College
- KDRC-LD, a television station (channel 26) licensed to serve Redding, California, United States, which held the call sign KGEC-LP or KGEC-LD from 1998 to 2022
