= CW 26 =

CW 26 may refer to the following television stations in the U.S. affiliated with the CW:

== Current ==
- KGCW in Burlington–Davenport, Iowa (O&O)
- KTKB-LD in Hagåtña, Guam
- WBDT in Springfield–Dayton, Ohio

== Former ==
- WCIU-TV in Chicago, Illinois (2019–2024)
