= Battle Rock =

Promontory on the coast of Oregon, USA

- Promontory
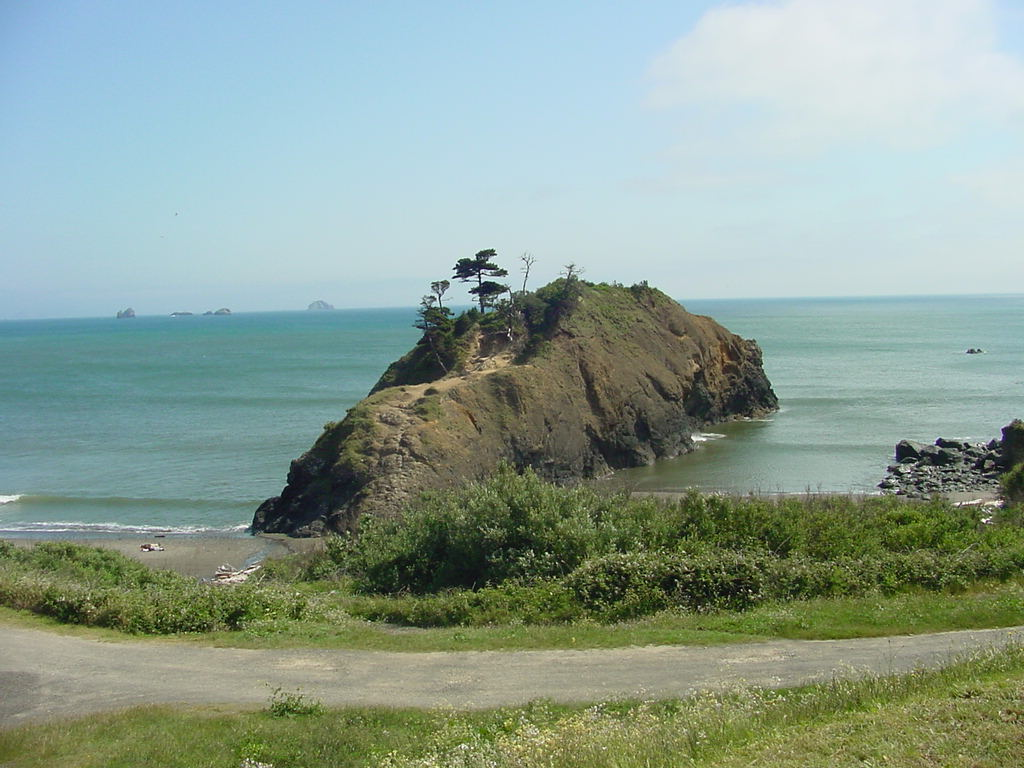
- Battle Rock, looking South

- Location of Battle Rock in Oregon Battle Rock (the United States)
- Coordinates: 42°44′21″N 124°29′18″W
- Location: Curry county, Oregon, U.S.
- Offshore water bodies: Pacific Ocean
- Age: Jurassic, Mesozoic
- Geology: Composed of basalt
- Topo map: USGS Port Orford

Battle Rock, or Battle Rock Arch, is a promontory on the west coast of the United States of America. It is located in the southwest Curry County of Oregon, near the small coastal city of Port Orford. The rock is composed mainly of basalt, and is part of the coastal Otter Point Formation. In 1851, a small skirmish broke out on the rock between white settlers and the indigenous Quatomah Tututnis, the Athapaskan people who lived in the area. The settlers eventually fled, before returning in greater numbers and establishing a fort at Cape Orford. The skirmish passed into local legend, becoming a part of Port Orford's community celebrations and folklore.

== Local geography ==
Battle Rock is set inside the city of Port Orford. Its borders follow the rock's outline. The formation is constrained to the south by the Pacific Ocean and to the north by both a beach named for the rock and by the townsite of Orford itself. At approximately 124 degrees, 29 minutes, and 18 seconds west longitude, Battle Rock is one of the westernmost places in Oregon, ceding first to the nearby Port Orford Heads, and then to Cape Blanco. Cape Blanco extends farther west than any point of land in the contiguous United States (lower 48 states) except portions of the Olympic Peninsula in Washington, including Cape Alava, the true westernmost point. The cape is part of Cape Blanco State Park and is the location of the Cape Blanco Light, first lit in 1870. The surrounding land is mostly covered in coniferous forest, a few geographic points (such as nearby Mount Humbug) shaping a landscape of mountains, valleys, and low hills.

=== Climate ===
The region around Battle Rock has an oceanic climate (Csb according to the Köppen climate classification system) with cool, very wet winters and mild, dry summers. The average annual precipitation is 72.61 in (1,844 mm). It is at the northern end of Oregon's "banana belt", a region with relatively warm weather caused by the Brookings effect. Its hardiness zone is 9b.

Climate data for Port Orford, Oregon
Month	Jan	Feb	Mar	Apr	May	Jun	Jul	Aug	Sep	Oct	Nov	Dec	Year
Record high °F (°C)	79 (26)	78 (26)	78 (26)	84 (29)	91 (33)	88 (31)	97 (36)	96 (36)	93 (34)	89 (32)	77 (25)	80 (27)	97 (36)
Mean daily maximum °F (°C)	54.4 (12.4)	55.0 (12.8)	55.4 (13.0)	56.9 (13.8)	60.7 (15.9)	63.9 (17.7)	67.5 (19.7)	68.2 (20.1)	67.2 (19.6)	63.1 (17.3)	57.3 (14.1)	54.5 (12.5)	60.3 (15.7)
Mean daily minimum °F (°C)	41.6 (5.3)	41.2 (5.1)	42.3 (5.7)	44.1 (6.7)	47.7 (8.7)	50.9 (10.5)	53.9 (12.2)	53.7 (12.1)	51.3 (10.7)	47.6 (8.7)	43.5 (6.4)	40.7 (4.8)	46.5 (8.1)
Record low °F (°C)	21 (−6)	19 (−7)	27 (−3)	28 (−2)	28 (−2)	35 (2)	39 (4)	35 (2)	36 (2)	28 (−2)	24 (−4)	13 (−11)	13 (−11)
Average precipitation inches (mm)	11.60 (295)	8.51 (216)	9.34 (237)	6.79 (172)	3.39 (86)	1.90 (48)	0.40 (10)	0.56 (14)	1.54 (39)	4.82 (122)	10.16 (258)	12.62 (321)	71.63 (1,818)
Average snowfall inches (cm)	0 (0)	0.1 (0.25)	0 (0)	0 (0)	0 (0)	0 (0)	0 (0)	0 (0)	0 (0)	0 (0)	0 (0)	0.1 (0.25)	0.2 (0.51)
Average precipitation days (≥ 0.05 in)	18.5	16.5	17	14	10	7	3	4	5	10.3	18	19	142.3
Source: NOAA

== Geology ==
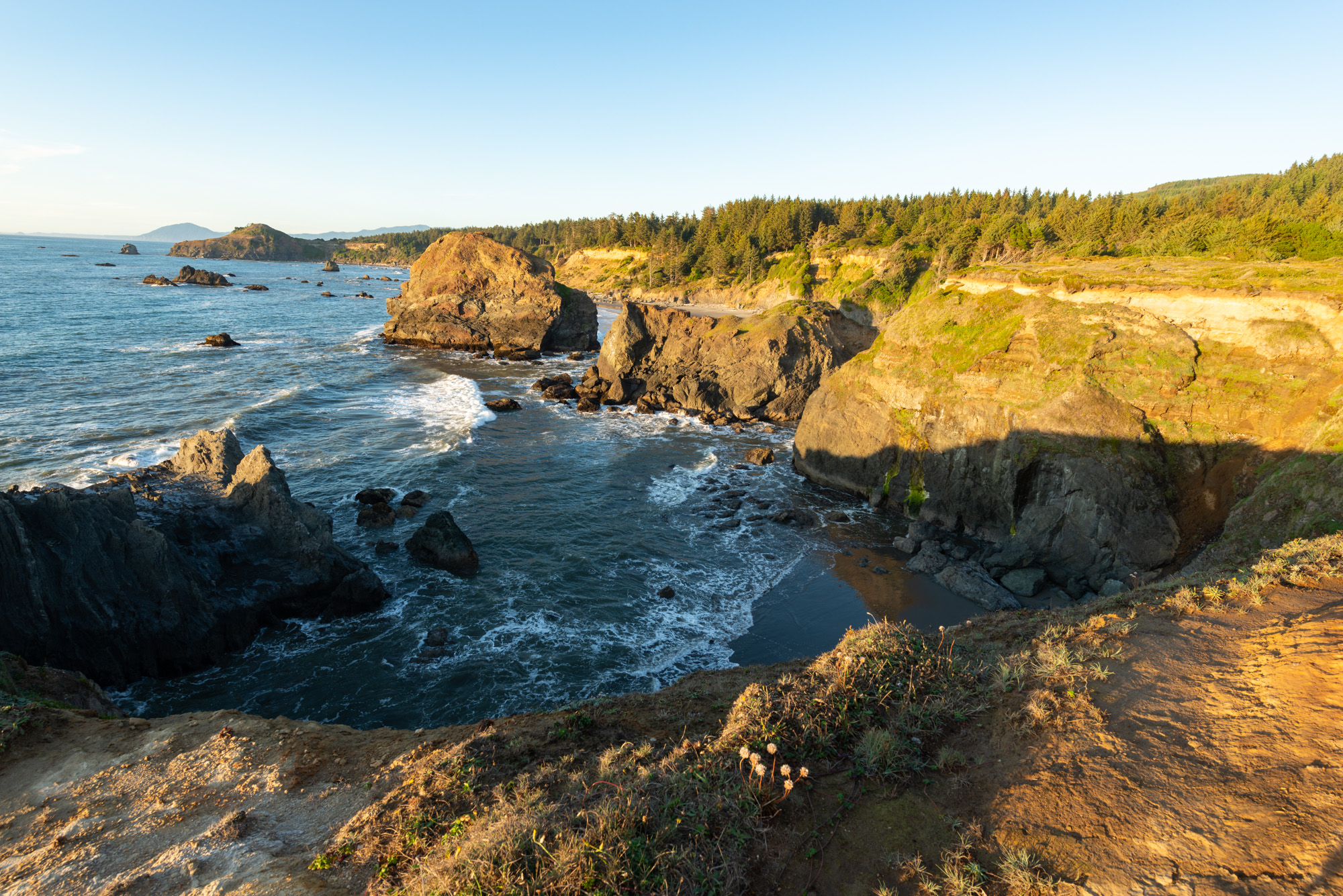
One section of the Otter Point Formation

Battle Rock is composed mainly of basalt. It lies almost detached from the mainland, was described as "100 yards (91 m) long" and as holding an elevation of "roughly 60 feet (18 m)" by William Tichenor himself, as well as later sources. It is part of the Otter Point Formation, a belt-like geological formation that extends to a point near Orford. Geologists estimate that most of the land in the Otter Point Formation can be dated back to the Jurassic period, while relatively nearby Humbug Mountain is made of lower cretaceous bedrock.

== History ==
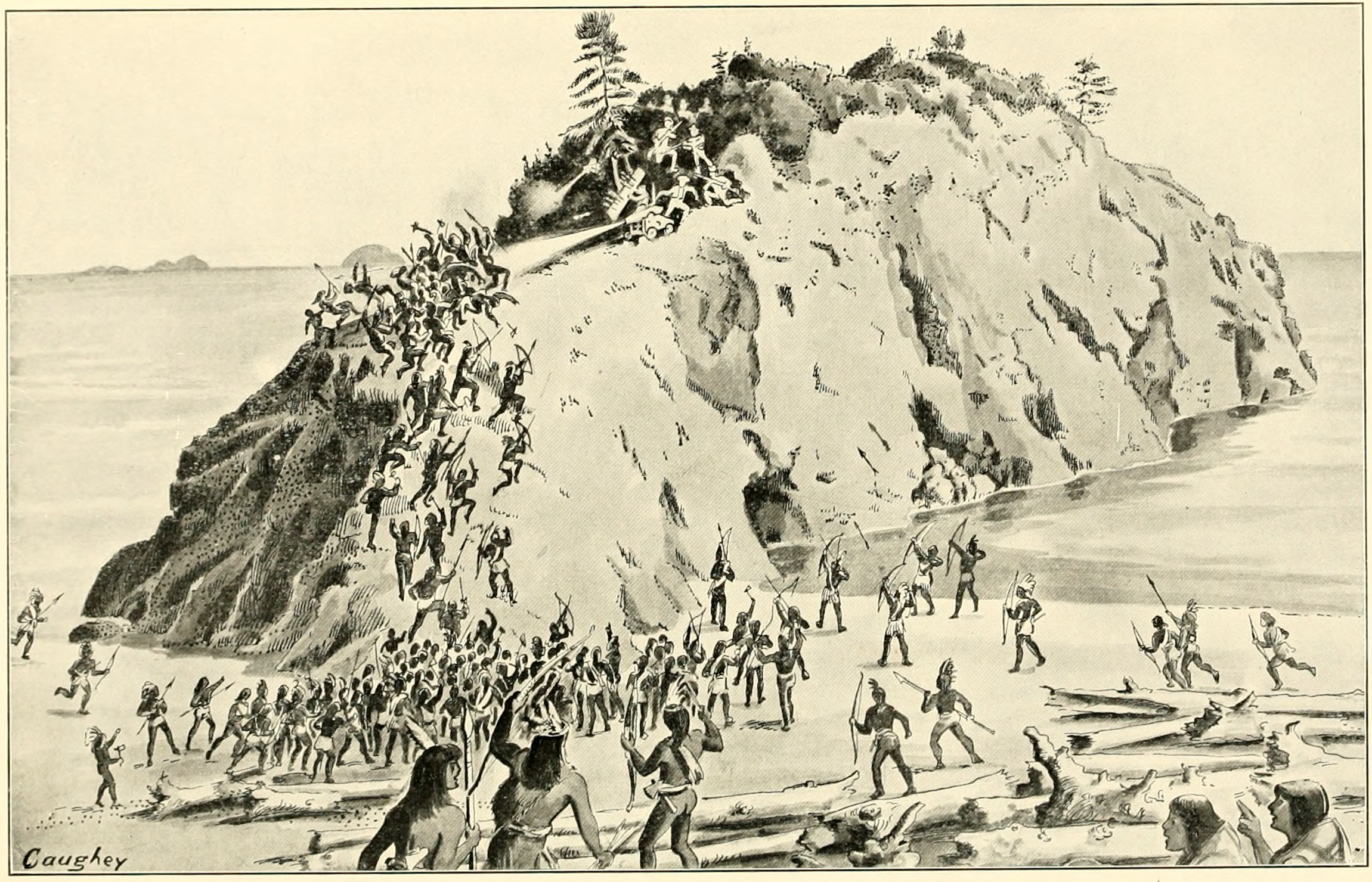
A drawing of the battle, n.d.

In 1851, as part of later western expansion to the Pacific Coast, captain William Tichenor embarked on an expedition to a small harbor, named "Port Orford" by George Vancouver over 50 years prior to Tichenor's departure from port. Upon arrival in Orford, Tichenor sent a small group—nine men—to shore. He then left for San Francisco, promising that he would return in 14 days. In San Francisco, Tichenor's ship, the S.S. Sea Gull, was repossessed. It took 16 days for Tichenor to return, during which an inconclusive amount of Quatomah were killed, between 10-20, and the nine men sent by Tichenor vanished, presumed dead by the settlers when they returned. The men reappeared at the town of Gardiner, where approximately a month later, the leader of the nine-man expedition, J. M. Kirkpatrick, published an account of the event. Kirkpatrick's retelling claimed that the event was a battle between the Quatomah and his men, which inspired the modern name for the rock.
During the Rogue River Wars, several native chiefs were executed on battle rock under the premise of Kirkpatrick's narrative. They, along with one member of the nine-men expedition who later died, are buried on battle rock.
