= Channel 26 virtual TV stations in the United States =

The following television stations operate on virtual channel 26 in the United States:

- K05MX-D in Nephi, Utah
- K07XL-D in Mountain Home, Arkansas
- K08LI-D in White Sulphur Spring, Montana
- K20NH-D in Brainerd, Minnesota
- K22NR-D in Stephenville, Texas
- K24NO-D in Bonners Ferry, Idaho
- K26CV-D in Ogallala, Nebraska
- K26DD-D in Kalispell, Montana
- K26FT-D in Santa Barbara, California
- K26GS-D in Harrison, Arkansas
- K26GV-D in Omak, Washington
- K26GY-D in Breckenridge, Colorado
- K26KC-D in Dallas, Texas
- K26KF-D in Duluth, Minnesota
- K26LQ-D in White Sulphur Spring, Montana
- K26PF-D in Saint Cloud, Minnesota
- K26PP-D in Santa Maria-Lompoc, California
- K26PR-D in Needles, California
- K30LS-D in Sandpoint, Idaho
- K31GP-D in Brookings, etc., Oregon
- K32LQ-D in Yreka, California
- K34NO-D in Grants Pass, Oregon
- K34NP-D in Red Lake, Minnesota
- K36PW-D in Priest Lake, Idaho
- KAAH-TV in Honolulu, Hawaii
- KAGW-CD in Wichita, Kansas
- KCDT in Coeur D'Alene, Idaho
- KCPO-LD in Sioux Falls, South Dakota
- KCVB-CD in Logan, Utah
- KDRC-LD in Redding, California
- KFTC in Bemidji, Minnesota
- KGCW in Burlington, Iowa
- KGNG-LD in Las Vegas, Nevada
- KHDT-LD in Denver, Colorado
- KINT-TV in El Paso, Texas
- KLSO-LD in Lubbock, Texas
- KMPH-TV in Visalia, California
- KMVU-DT in Medford, Oregon
- KNDB in Bismarck, North Dakota
- KNPN-LD in Saint Joseph, Missouri
- KODF-LD in Dallas, Texas
- KOZJ in Joplin, Missouri
- KPMF-LD in Paragould, Arkansas
- KPXL-TV in Uvalde, Texas
- KRIV in Houston, Texas
- KTKB-LD in Tamuning, Guam
- KTKV-LD in Twin Falls, Idaho
- KTSF in San Francisco, California
- KUCL-LD in Salt Lake City, Utah
- KULC-LD in Port Arthur, Texas
- KVHD-LD in Los Angeles, California
- KVSD-LD in San Diego, California
- KVTH-DT in Hot Springs, Arkansas
- KXNV-LD in Incline Village, Nevada
- KYNE-TV in Omaha, Nebraska
- KZBZ-CD in Clovis, New Mexico
- W15EF-D in Sparta, North Carolina
- W26BB-D in Vicksburg, Mississippi
- W26DH-D in Auburn, Indiana
- W26ET-D in Chattanooga, Tennessee
- W26EW-D in Huntington, West Virginia
- W26EX-D in Jacksonville, Florida
- W26FG-D in Eau Claire, Wisconsin
- W26FJ-D in Valdosta, Georgia
- W26FM-D in Glasgow, Kentucky
- W27EK-D in Boone, North Carolina
- W30CS-D in Zionville, North Carolina
- WAGT-CD in Augusta, Georgia
- WAIQ in Montgomery, Alabama
- WBUD-LD in Atlanta, Georgia
- WCEA-LD in Boston, Massachusetts
- WCIU-TV in Chicago, Illinois
- WDID-LD in Savannah, Georgia
- WDRJ-LD in Albany, Georgia
- WETA-TV in Washington, D.C.
- WGBA-TV in Green Bay, Wisconsin
- WGNO in New Orleans, Louisiana
- WGVT-LD in Gainesville, Florida
- WHPX-TV in New London, Connecticut
- WIVD-LD in Newcomerstown, Ohio
- WIYE-LD in Parkersburg, West Virginia
- WMEA-TV in Biddeford, Maine
- WMNN-LD in Lake City, Michigan
- WMVH-CD in Charleroi, Pennsylvania
- WNGF-LD in Potsdam, New York
- WNTU-LD in Nashville, Tennessee
- WNYB in Jamestown, New York
- WOTF-TV in Daytona Beach, Florida
- WQTO in Ponce, Puerto Rico
- WRDP-LD in Columbus, Georgia
- WSFX-TV in Wilmington, North Carolina
- WTGC-LD in New Bern, North Carolina
- WTNC-LD in Durham, North Carolina
- WUEK-LD in Canton, Ohio
- WUNL-TV in Winston-Salem, North Carolina
- WUWT-CD in Union City, Tennessee
- WXAX-CD in Clearwater, Florida
- WZEO-LD in La Crosse, Wisconsin
- WZVN-TV in Naples, Florida

The following stations, which are no longer licensed, formerly operated on virtual channel 26:

- KFWY-LD in Cheyenne, Wyoming
- KGKY-LD in Joplin, Missouri
- W26DC-D in Roslyn, New York
- W26DS-D in La Grange, Georgia
- WAGT in Augusta, Georgia
- WDRL-LD in Wilmington, North Carolina
- WEDD-LD in Roanoke, Virginia
- WEYB-LD in Montgomery, Alabama
- WTBS-LD in Atlanta, Georgia
- WYXN-LD in New York, New York
