= XHIE-TDT =

Television station in Acapulco

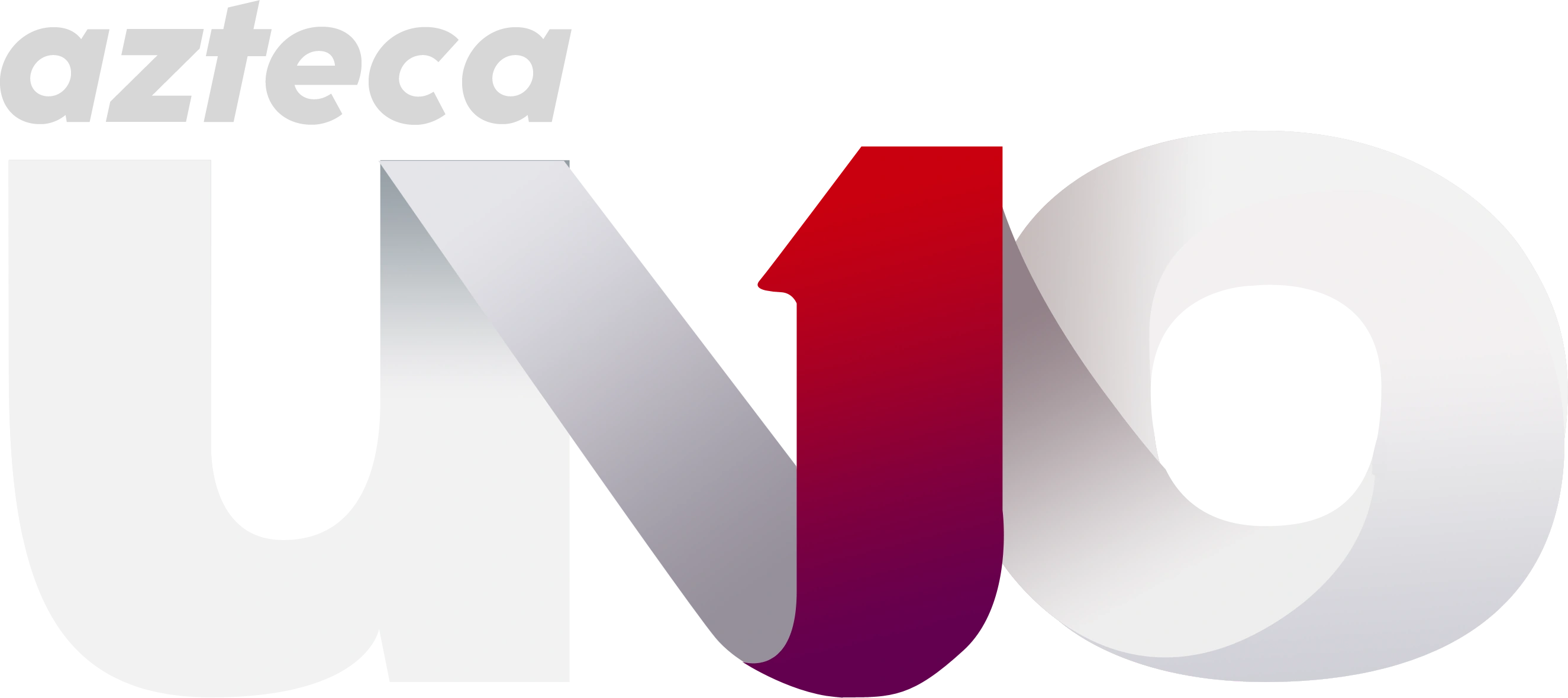
- Logo used since 2023
- Acapulco, Guerrero; Mexico
- Channels: Digital: 14 (UHF); Virtual: 1
- Branding: Azteca Uno Acapulco

Programming
- Affiliations: 1.1: Azteca Uno

Ownership
- Owner: TV Azteca; (Televisión Azteca, S.A. de C.V.)
- Sister stations: XHACC-TDT

History
- Founded: 1975
- Former call signs: XHIE-TV (1970–2016)
- Former channel numbers: 10 (analog and digital virtual, 1975–2016)

Technical information
- Licensing authority: CRT
- ERP: 44.39 kW
- Translator(s): RF 23; Cd. Cuauhtémoc; Cd. Delicias

Links
- Website: www.aztecaguerrero.com

XHIE-TDT (channel 1) is a TV Azteca television station in Acapulco, Guerrero, Mexico.

== History ==
On July 27, 1970, concessionaire Tele-Radio Nacional, S.A. applied for a television license to operate on channel 10 in Acapulco. At the same time it applied for a second station (XHIR-TV) in Iguala. The station was a relay of XHDF-TV, making it a part of the Imevisión network.

On May 10, 1993, the station was licensed to TV Azteca, becoming an affiliate of Azteca 13.

XHIE was sanctioned alongside its relay XHIR on February 15, 2011 for airing political advertising for the governor of the state of Guerrero.

== Technical information ==
XHIE-TDT broadcasts on RF channel 14 (virtual channel 1).

Until standardization of virtual channels in October 2016, XHIE broadcast on virtual channel 10. Until 2021, it broadcast on RF channel 48.

=== Subchannel ===
| Channel | Res. | Short name | Network | Programming |
|---|---|---|---|---|
| 1.1 | 1080i | XHIE-TDT | Azteca Uno-HD | Azteca Uno (national programming only) |

As of 2017, XHIE-TDT was an Azteca 13/Azteca Uno transmitter that requested the broadcast of Proyecto 40 (currently adn40) via a subchannel.
