= Port Orford, Oregon =

- City
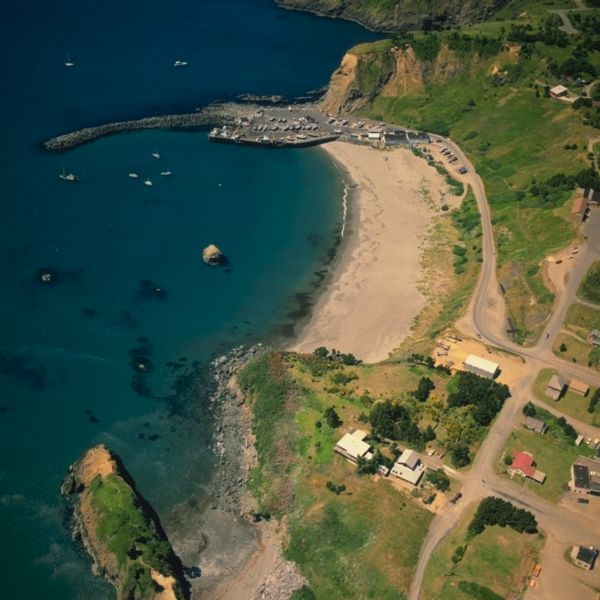
- 1990 Aerial view of Port Orford
- Motto: "Natural. Wonders."
- Location in Oregon

- Location in the United States
- Coordinates: 42°44′59″N 124°29′51″W
- Country: United States
- State: Oregon
- County: Curry
- Incorporated: 1911

Area
  - Total: 1.60 sq mi (4.15 km^{2})
  - Land: 1.56 sq mi (4.04 km^{2})
  - Water: 0.046 sq mi (0.12 km^{2})
- Elevation: 43 ft (13 m)

Population (2020)
  - Total: 1,146
  - Density: 735/sq mi (283.9/km^{2})
- Time zone: UTC-8 (Pacific)
  - Summer (DST): UTC-7 (Pacific)
- ZIP code: 97465
- Area code: 541
- FIPS code: 41-59250
- GNIS feature ID: 2411467
- Website: www.portorford.org

Port Orford (Tolowa: tr’ee-ghi~’- ’an’) is a city in Curry County on the southern coast of Oregon, United States. The population was 1,146 at the 2020 census.

The city takes its name from George Vancouver's original name for nearby Cape Blanco, which he named for George, Earl of Orford, "a much-respected friend."

Port Orford is the westernmost settlement in the state of Oregon, and the westernmost incorporated place in the 48 contiguous states.

== History ==
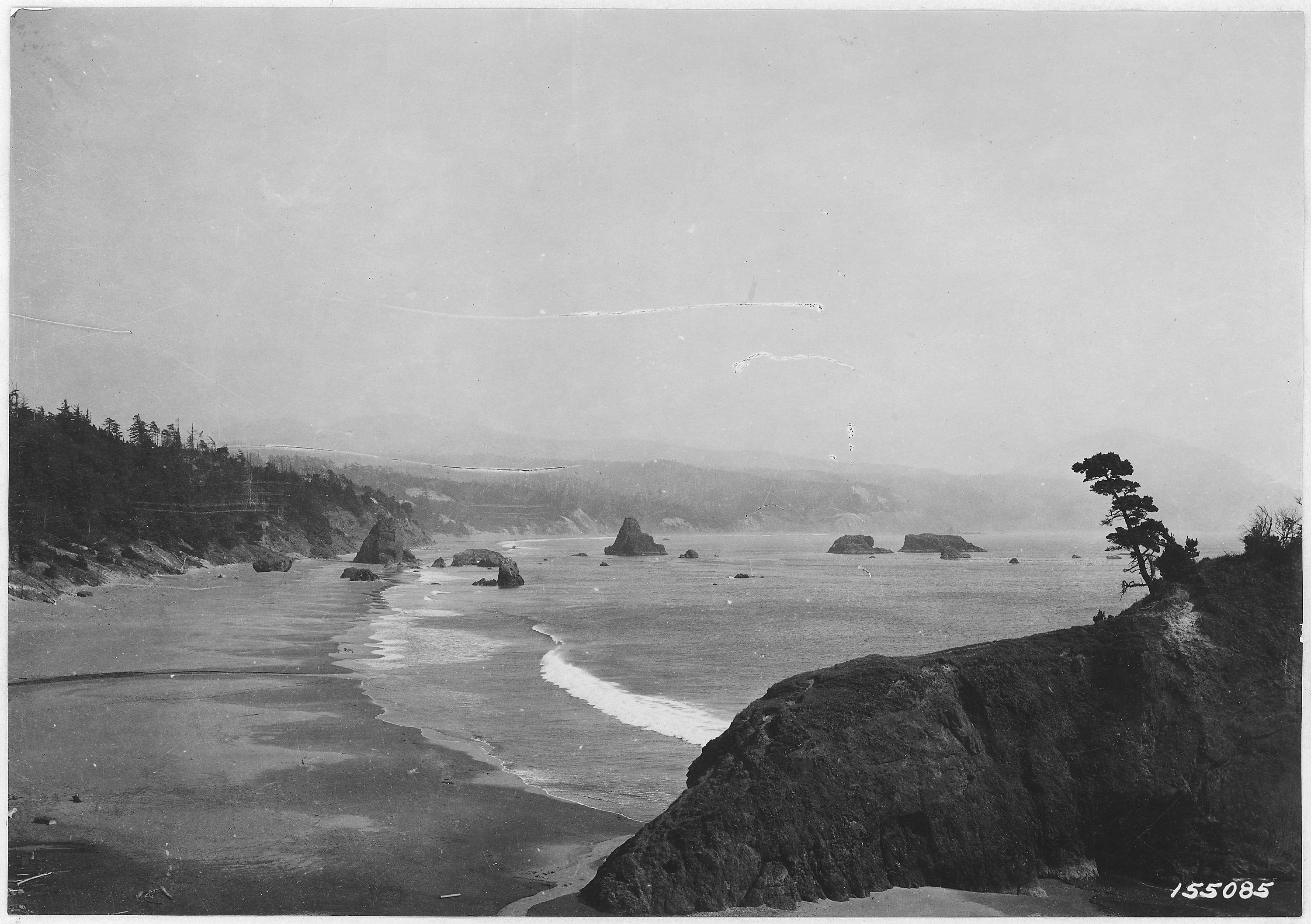
Circa 1920–30

Before the arrival of European settlers, the Port Orford area was inhabited by the indigenous Tututni people. The Tututni languages were a part of the Pacific Coast Athabaskan language family.

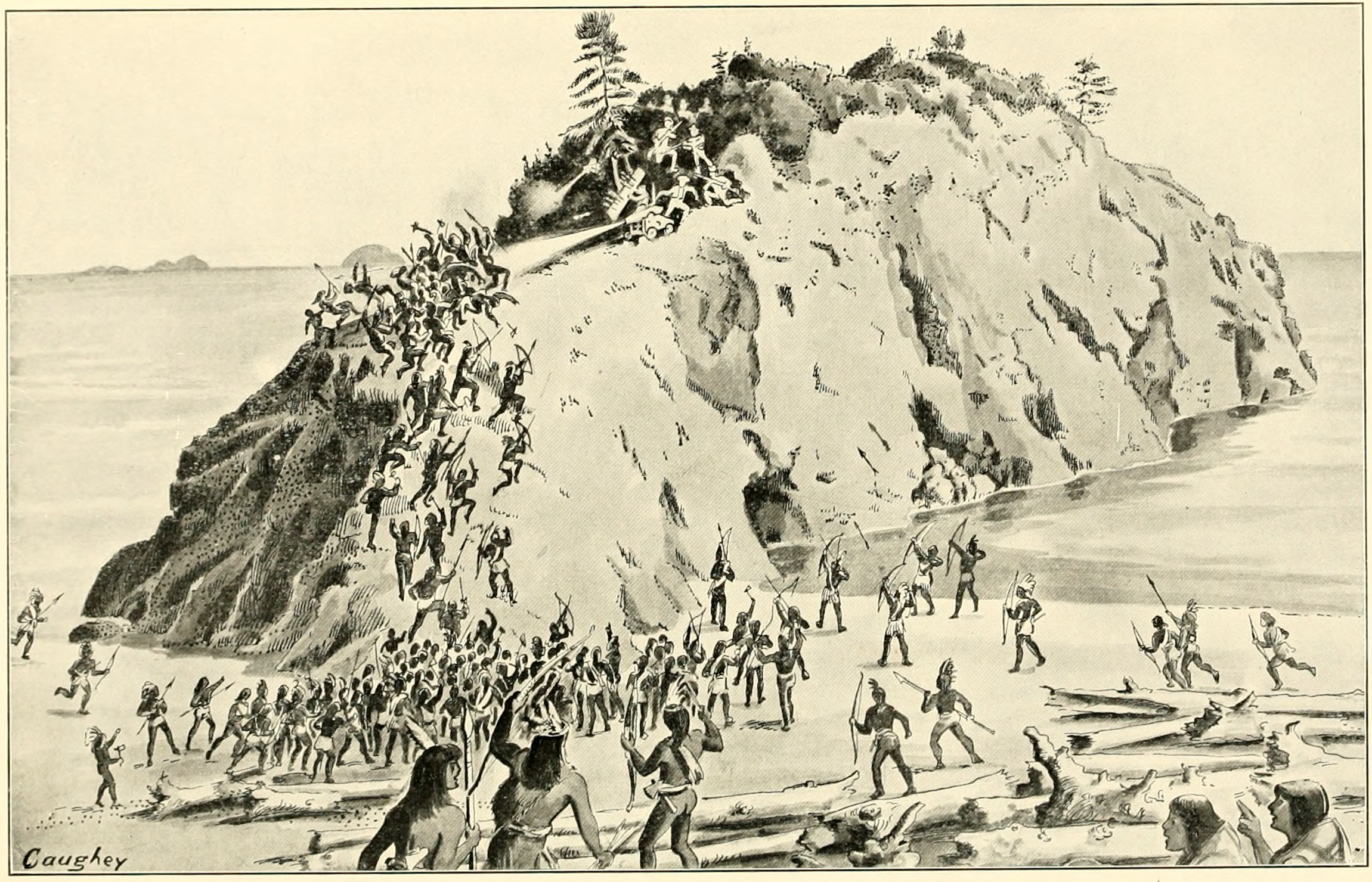
Battle Rock as depicted in the 19th century

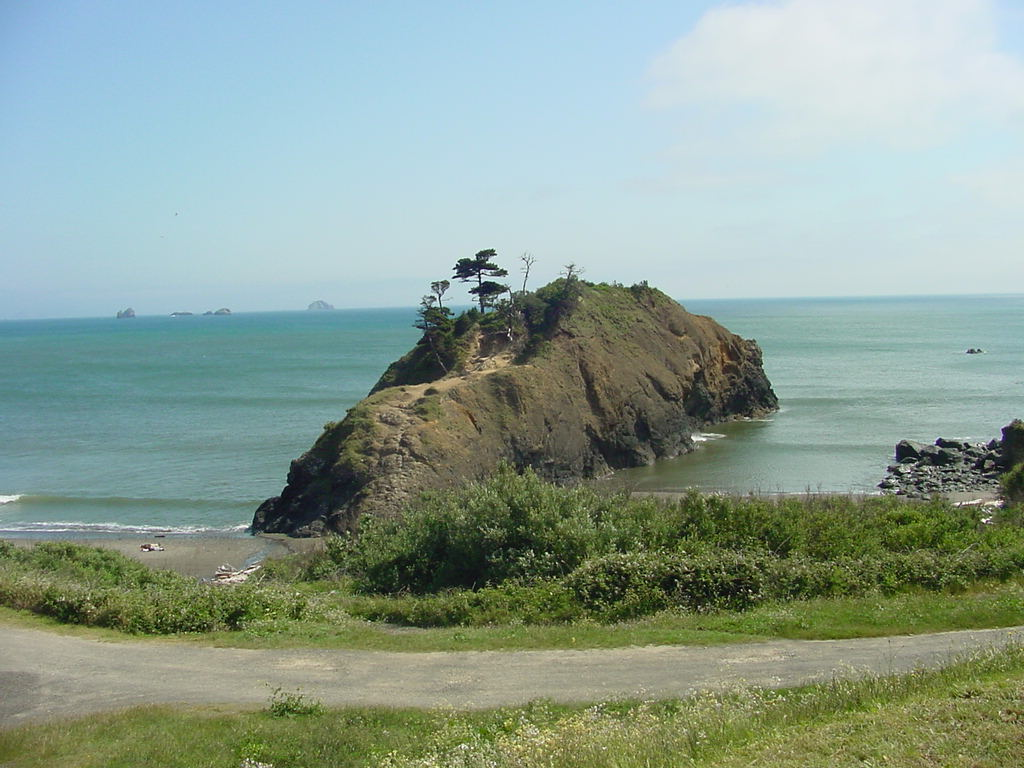
Battle Rock

Spanish explorer Bartoleme Ferrelo mapped Cape Blanco in 1543. It remained the farthest north point on the coastal map until 1778, when British explorer Captain Cook found land farther west. Captain George Vancouver sighted land and named it Port Orford in 1792. In June 1851, Captain William Tichenor, in command of the U.S.S. Seagull, pulled into Port Orford, leaving behind nine men. Fort Orford, a U.S. Army fort, was established 14 Sep 1851 near the town and lasted until 22 Aug 1856.

In October 1941, then-mayor Gilbert Gable, frustrated with the poor condition of the state roads around Port Orford, which hampered both travel and economic development, suggested that a number of counties along the Oregon and California state border should secede and create the State of Jefferson. This movement came to an end with U.S. involvement in World War II.

== Geography ==
Port Orford is located on U.S. Route 101 between the Pacific Ocean and the Siskiyou National Forest, 28 miles (45 km) north of Gold Beach and 27 miles (43 km) south of Bandon. At 124 degrees, 29 minutes, 53 seconds west longitude, it is the westernmost city in the contiguous United States, though in Clallam County, Washington, there are three unincorporated communities that are farther west than Port Orford: Neah Bay, La Push, and Ozette. According to the United States Census Bureau, the city has a total area of 1.61 square miles (4.17 km^{2}), of which 1.56 square miles (4.04 km^{2}) is land and 0.05 square miles (0.13 km^{2}) is water.

There is a low promontory called Battle Rock on the southern coast of Port Orford.

=== Climate ===
Port Orford has an oceanic climate (Csb according to the Köppen climate classification system) with cool, very wet winters and mild, dry summers. The average annual precipitation is 72.61 in (1,844 mm). It is at the northern end of Oregon's "banana belt", a region with relatively warm weather caused by the Brookings effect. Its hardiness zone is 9b.

Climate data for Port Orford, Oregon (1991–2020 normals, extremes 1905–present)
Month	Jan	Feb	Mar	Apr	May	Jun	Jul	Aug	Sep	Oct	Nov	Dec	Year
Record high °F (°C)	79 (26)	79 (26)	82 (28)	82 (28)	88 (31)	86 (30)	88 (31)	86 (30)	95 (35)	89 (32)	78 (26)	80 (27)	95 (35)
Mean daily maximum °F (°C)	54.4 (12.4)	55.0 (12.8)	55.4 (13.0)	56.9 (13.8)	60.7 (15.9)	63.9 (17.7)	67.5 (19.7)	68.2 (20.1)	67.2 (19.6)	63.1 (17.3)	57.3 (14.1)	54.5 (12.5)	60.3 (15.7)
Daily mean °F (°C)	48.0 (8.9)	48.1 (8.9)	48.8 (9.3)	50.5 (10.3)	54.2 (12.3)	57.4 (14.1)	60.7 (15.9)	60.9 (16.1)	59.3 (15.2)	55.4 (13.0)	50.4 (10.2)	47.6 (8.7)	53.4 (11.9)
Mean daily minimum °F (°C)	41.6 (5.3)	41.2 (5.1)	42.3 (5.7)	44.1 (6.7)	47.7 (8.7)	50.9 (10.5)	53.9 (12.2)	53.7 (12.1)	51.3 (10.7)	47.6 (8.7)	43.5 (6.4)	40.7 (4.8)	46.5 (8.1)
Record low °F (°C)	14 (−10)	19 (−7)	26 (−3)	24 (−4)	26 (−3)	33 (1)	33 (1)	35 (2)	28 (−2)	28 (−2)	20 (−7)	13 (−11)	13 (−11)
Average precipitation inches (mm)	11.60 (295)	8.51 (216)	9.34 (237)	6.79 (172)	3.39 (86)	1.90 (48)	0.40 (10)	0.56 (14)	1.54 (39)	4.82 (122)	10.16 (258)	12.62 (321)	71.63 (1,818)
Average precipitation days (≥ 0.05 in)	20.4	17.3	20.2	18.3	11.2	7.6	2.3	2.8	5.7	11.6	20.0	20.3	157.7
Source: NOAA

== Demographics ==
Historical population
Census	Pop.	Note	%±
1860	146		—
1870	100		−31.5%
1890	108		—
1900	227		110.2%
1910	227		0.0%
1920	217		−4.4%
1930	300		38.2%
1940	755		151.7%
1950	674		−10.7%
1960	1,171		73.7%
1970	1,037		−11.4%
1980	1,061		2.3%
1990	1,025		−3.4%
2000	1,153		12.5%
2010	1,133		−1.7%
2020	1,146		1.1%

=== 2020 census ===
As of the 2020 census, Port Orford had a population of 1,146. The median age was 60.8 years. 11.3% of residents were under the age of 18 and 41.0% of residents were 65 years of age or older. For every 100 females there were 98.6 males, and for every 100 females age 18 and over there were 94.5 males age 18 and over.

0% of residents lived in urban areas, while 100.0% lived in rural areas.

There were 605 households in Port Orford, of which 14.0% had children under the age of 18 living in them. Of all households, 36.7% were married-couple households, 24.6% were households with a male householder and no spouse or partner present, and 31.7% were households with a female householder and no spouse or partner present. About 42.1% of all households were made up of individuals and 26.2% had someone living alone who was 65 years of age or older.

There were 737 housing units, of which 17.9% were vacant. Among occupied housing units, 66.6% were owner-occupied and 33.4% were renter-occupied. The homeowner vacancy rate was 1.2% and the rental vacancy rate was 7.6%.

Racial composition as of the 2020 census
Race	Number	Percent
White	1,011	88.2%
Black or African American	5	0.4%
American Indian and Alaska Native	21	1.8%
Asian	8	0.7%
Native Hawaiian and Other Pacific Islander	4	0.3%
Some other race	12	1.0%
Two or more races	85	7.4%
Hispanic or Latino (of any race)	48	4.2%

=== 2010 census ===
As of the census of 2010, there were 1,133 people, 603 households, and 285 families residing in the city. The population density was 726.3 inhabitants per square mile (280.4/km^{2}). There were 767 housing units at an average density of 491.7 per square mile (189.8/km^{2}). The racial makeup of the city was 93.3% White, 0.6% African American, 1.4% Native American, 0.5% Asian, 0.9% from other races, and 3.3% from two or more races. Hispanic or Latino of any race were 4.3% of the population.

There were 603 households, of which 11.8% had children under the age of 18 living with them, 35.3% were married couples living together, 8.8% had a female householder with no husband present, 3.2% had a male householder with no wife present, and 52.7% were non-families. 43.4% of all households were made up of individuals, and 15.6% had someone living alone who was 65 years of age or older. The average household size was 1.86 and the average family size was 2.47.

The median age in the city was 54.7 years. 11.8% of residents were under the age of 18; 6.6% were between the ages of 18 and 24; 16.3% were from 25 to 44; 36.7% were from 45 to 64; and 28.8% were 65 years of age or older. The gender makeup of the city was 48.0% male and 52.0% female.

=== 2000 census ===
As of the census of 2000, there were 1,153 people, 571 households, and 311 families residing in the city. The population density was 719.1 inhabitants per square mile (277.6/km^{2}). There were 662 housing units at an average density of 412.9 per square mile (159.4/km^{2}). The racial makeup of the city was 95.40% White, 0.09% African American, 1.39% Native American, 0.26% Asian, 0.17% Pacific Islander, 0.87% from other races, and 1.82% from two or more races. Hispanic or Latino of any race were 2.60% of the population.

There were 571 households, out of which 19.6% had children under the age of 18 living with them, 44.0% were married couples living together, 9% had a female householder with no husband present, and 45% were non-families. 39% of all households were made up of individuals, and 18.2% had someone living alone who was 65 years of age or older. The average household size was 2 people and the average family size was 2.66.

In the city, the population was spread out, with 18.8% under the age of 18, 3.4% from 18 to 24, 19.7% from 25 to 44, 30.8% from 45 to 64, and 27.3% who were 65 years of age or older. The median age was 50 years. For every 100 females, there were 92.2 males.

The median income for a household in the city was $23,289, and the median income for a family was $29,653. Males had a median income of $35,221 versus $15,179 for females. The per capita income for the city was $16,442. About 16.1% of families and 17.8% of the population were below the poverty line, including 21.9% of those under age 18 and 9.2% of those age 65 or over.

== Education ==
The city is served by the Port Orford-Langlois School District, which includes Driftwood Elementary School, and Pacific High School.

== Media ==
- KDPO-FM 91.9 Radio, repeater station to KDOV-FM of Medford, Oregon

== Notable people ==
- Hanneke Cassel (1978–), folk violinist
- Eli Clare (1963–), writer
- Samuel Colver (1817–1891), settler
- Richard T. Drinnon (1925–2012), historian
- Gilbert Gable (1886–1941), politician
- Nick Reynolds (1933–2008), musician
- David Brock Smith, politician
- Rick Harrison (1965-), TV star
- William Tichenor (1813-1887), settler and politician

== See also ==
- Fort Orford
- Orford Reef
- Port Orford meteorite hoax
