= Pacific High School (Port Orford, Oregon) =

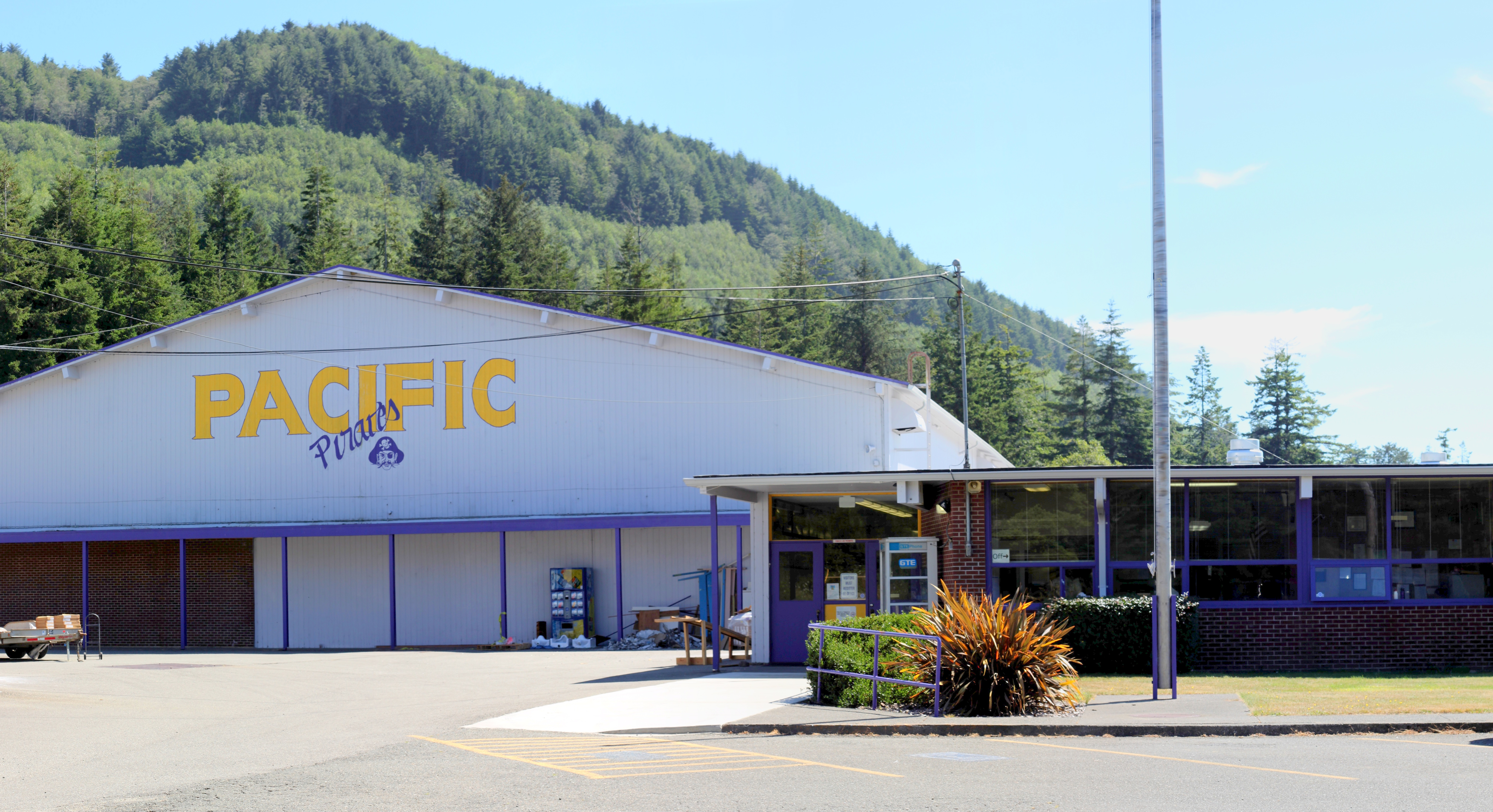

Location
- 45525 Hwy 101; Port Orford, Oregon 97456; United States; 42.8458°N 124.4720°W

Information
- Type: Public
- School district: Port Orford-Langlois School District
- Principal: Bonita Stout
- Teaching staff: 8.01 (FTE)
- Grades: 9 -12
- Enrollment: 61 (2025–26)
- Student to teacher ratio: 7.62
- Colors: Purple, gold, and white
- Athletics conference: OSAA Skyline League 1A-4
- Mascot: Pirates
- Newspaper: The Jolly Roger
- Website: www.2cj.com/copy-of-schools

Pacific High School is a public high school in Curry County, Port Orford, Oregon, United States. It is the only high school in the Port Orford-Langlois district.

== Academics ==
In 2008, 82% of the school's seniors received a high school diploma. Of 34 students, 28 graduated, three dropped out and three received a modified diploma. In 2022, 77% of students graduated on-time, and 3 dropped out.
