= Channel 4 branded TV stations in the United States =

The following television stations in the United States brand as channel 4 (though neither using virtual channel 4 nor broadcasting on physical RF channel 4):

- KTKB-LD in Tamuning, Guam
- KVEO-DT2 Brownsville, Texas
- KXJB-LD in Fargo, North Dakota
- WCIV-DT2 in Charleston, South Carolina
- WCYB-DT2 in Bristol, Virginia
- WFTX-TV in Cape Coral, Florida
- WGFL in High Springs, Florida
- WNYA in Pittsfield, Massachusetts
- WOTV in Battle Creek, Michigan
