= Fort Umpqua =

Coordinates: 43°38′0″N 123°34′15″W

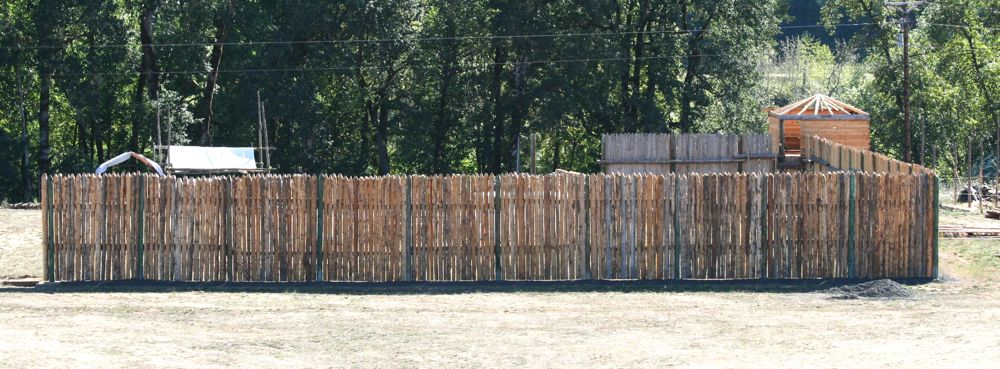
Reproduction of Fort Umpqua Under Construction September 2008

Fort Umpqua was a trading post built by the Hudson's Bay Company in the company's Columbia District (or Oregon Country), in what is now the U.S. state of Oregon. It was first established in 1832 and moved and rebuilt in 1836.

Fort Umpqua was first established in 1832 at the confluence of Calapooya Creek and the Umpqua River. In 1836 it was moved and rebuilt on the south bank of the Umpqua River near the mouth of Elk Creek, at present-day Elkton, Oregon. The fort was intended to serve company's fur trade operations along the Umpqua River, Rogue River, and Klamath River.

The United States Exploring Expedition under Charles Wilkes visited Fort Umpqua in 1841.

On November 15, 1851, a fire destroyed Fort Umpqua. In 1854 the post was closed for good.

== Second Fort Umpqua ==
Another Fort Umpqua was established later, in 1856 at the end of the 1855–1856 Rogue River War. It was located on the north bank of the Umpqua River about two miles from its mouth, near Gardiner, Oregon. Its structures including a blockhouse and barracks was built from salvaged material from Fort Orford. Troops from the District of California continued to be stationed here until conflict with Native American tribes subsided. The fort was abandoned in 1862. The old blockhouse and soldiers' barracks were later moved into town as a memorial.

The USGS lists two historic locations, attributed to Lewis, A. and Lewis L. McArthur in Oregon Geographic Names.
