= Channel 26 TV stations in Mexico =

The following television stations broadcast on digital channel 26 in Mexico:

- XEWO-TDT in Guadalajara, Jalisco
- XHAPA-TDT in Apatzingán, Michoacán de Ocampo
- XHCCB-TDT in Ciudad Constitución, Baja California Sur
- XHCGA-TDT in Aguascalientes, Aguascalientes
- XHCJ-TDT in Sabinas, Coahuila de Zaragoza
- XHCKW-TDT in Colima, Colima
- XHCQO-TDT in Chetumal, Quintana Roo
- XHCTCZ-TDT in Cerro Azul, Veracruz
- XHCTLE-TDT in León, Guanajuato
- XHCTSA-TDT in Saltillo, Coahuila
- XHCVI-TDT in Ciudad Victoria, Tamaulipas
- XHDB-TDT in Durango, Durango
- XHDG-TDT in Oaxaca, Oaxaca
- XHEBC-TDT in Ensenada, Baja California
- XHFI-TDT in Chihuahua, Chihuahua
- XHFW-TDT in Tampico, Tamaulipas
- XHGOC-TDT in Ocampo, Guanajuato
- XHGV-TDT on Cerro de Las Lajas, Veracruz
- XHGWT-TDT in Guerrero Negro, Baja California Sur
- XHHPT-TDT in Hidalgo Del Parral, Chihuahua
- XHIGG-TDT in Iguala, Guerrero
- XHLCM-TDT in Lázaro Cárdenas, Michoacán de Ocampo
- XHNTV-TDT in Tepic, Nayarit
- XHNON-TDT in Nogales, Sonora
- XHOMT-TDT in Ometepec, Guerrero
- XHPMS-TDT in Matehuala, San Luis Potosí
- XHQUR-TDT in Querétaro, Querétaro de Arteaga
- XHRIO-TDT in Matamoros, Tamaulipas
- XHSJC-TDT in San José del Cabo, Baja California Sur
- XHSPRCA-TDT in Coatzacoalcos, Veracruz
- XHSPRTP-TDT in Tapachula, Chiapas
- XHTOB-TDT in Torreón, Coahuila
- XHTOE-TDT in Tenosique, Tabasco
- XHTVM-TDT in Mexico City
- XHVFC-TDT in Villaflores, Chiapas
