= XHIT-TDT =

Television station in Chihuahua City

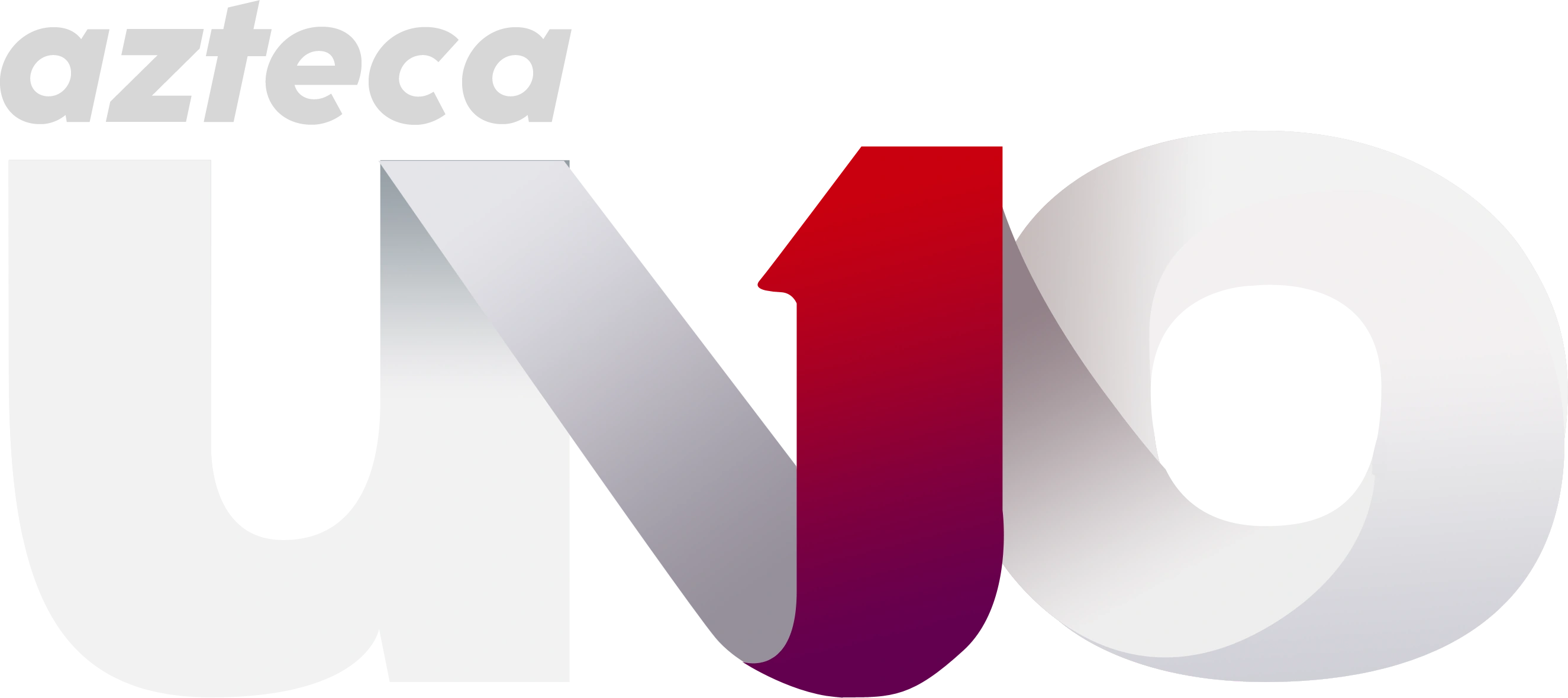
- Logo used since 2023
- Chihuahua, Chihuahua; Mexico
- Channels: Digital: 23 (UHF); Virtual: 1
- Branding: Azteca Uno Chihuahua

Programming
- Affiliations: 1.3: Azteca Uno

Ownership
- Owner: TV Azteca; (Televisión Azteca, S.A. de C.V.)
- Sister stations: XHCH-TDT, XHECH-TDT

History
- Founded: 1968
- Former call signs: XHIT-TV (1968–2016)
- Former channel numbers: 4 (analog and digital virtual, 1968–2016)

Technical information
- Licensing authority: CRT
- ERP: 51.41 kW
- HAAT: 263.6 m (865 ft)
- Transmitter coordinates: 28°38′48.6″N 106°03′01.1″W
- Translator(s): RF 23; Cd. Cuauhtémoc; Cd. Delicias

Links
- Website: www.aztecachihuahua.com

XHIT-TDT (channel 1) is a TV Azteca television station in Chihuahua, Chihuahua, Mexico. XHIT carries TV Azteca's Azteca Uno with a one-hour delay.

== History ==
XHIT was founded in 1968 on channel 4 as a station of Tele-Cadena Mexicana, which also owned XHCH-TV channel 2; original concessionaire Televisora de Chihuahua merged with the concessionaire for XHCH in 1970. However, the station went off the air in December 1972. On August 8, 1973, a decree was published in the Diario Oficial de la Federación ordering the station to be put out for bid again, stating that XHIT going off the air "deprives a sector of the population of the right it has to receive the station's cultural, civic and entertainment programming". The concession wound up in the hands of Corporación Mexicana de Radio y Televisión — the government's Canal 13 — when it was quickly put out for bid again the following month. Four other bidders attempted to acquire the station, including Francisco Galindo Romero, the founder of Televisa-affiliated XHL-TV in León, Guanajuato.

During the Canal 13 and Imevisión era, XHIT was the only Canal 13 rebroadcaster in the market, as XHCH was tied to the XHGC network for years, and Imevisión operated XHCH as a separate local station. Upon taking control, Azteca changed both XHCH and XHIT to rebroadcast Azteca Uno, though XHIT broadcasts it with a one-hour delay.

== Technical information ==
XHIT-TDT broadcasts on RF channel 23 (virtual channel 1). Two channel 1 stations appear for viewers of XHIT and XHCH.

Until standardization of virtual channels in October 2016, XHIT broadcast on virtual channel 4.

=== Subchannels ===
Channel	Res.	Short name	Programming
1.3	1080i	XHIT-TDT	Azteca Uno-HD (national programming only, one hour delay)

=== Repeaters ===
XHIT has three repeaters:

RF	Location	ERP
23	Ciudad Cuauhtémoc	23.85 kW
23	Ciudad Delicias	11.5 kW
23	Gran Morelos	1.435 kW
