= XHCH-TDT =

Television station in Chihuahua City

XHCH-TV
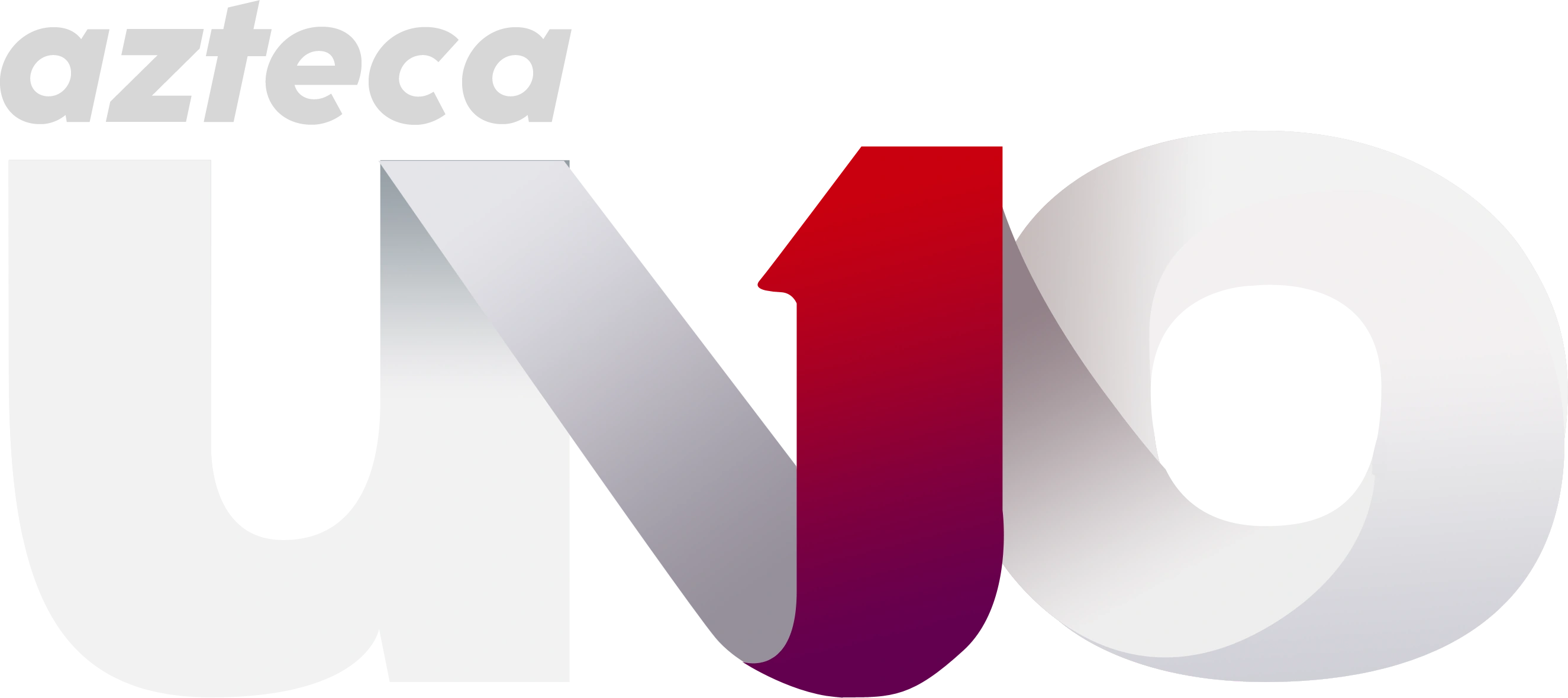
- Logo used since 2023
- Chihuahua, Chihuahua; Mexico
- Channels: Digital: 22 (UHF); Virtual: 1
- Branding: Azteca Uno Chihuahua

Programming
- Affiliations: 1.1: Azteca Uno; 1.2: ADN40

Ownership
- Owner: TV Azteca; (Televisión Azteca, S.A. de C.V.)
- Sister stations: XHECH-TDT, XHIT-TDT

History
- First air date: March 16, 1968
- Former call signs: XHCH-TV (1968–2015)
- Former channel numbers: 2 (VHF analog, 1968–2015; digital virtual, until 2016)
- Former affiliations: Canal 5 (secondary, 1968–1983)
- Call sign meaning: Chihuahua

Technical information
- Licensing authority: CRT
- ERP: 51.47 kW
- Transmitter coordinates: 28°38′48.6″N 106°03′01.1″W
- Translator(s): 22 (1.1) (UHF); Delicias, Chih

Links
- Website: www.aztecachihuahua.com

XHCH-TDT (channel 1) is a television station in Chihuahua, Chihuahua, Mexico. XHCH is owned by TV Azteca and broadcasts its Azteca Uno network.

== History ==
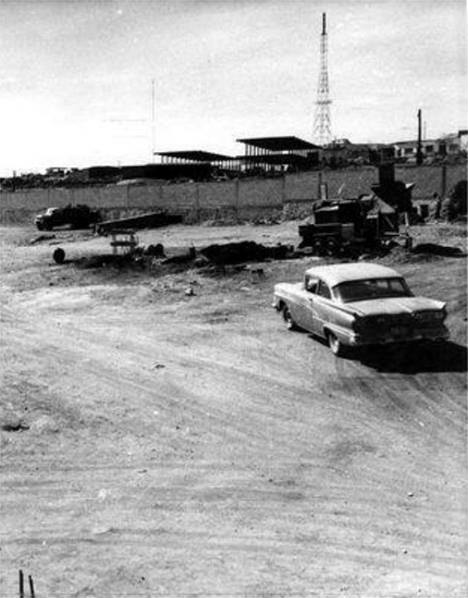
XHCH-TV transmission tower in the 1970s

=== 1960s and 1970s ===
XHCH-TV came to air on March 16, 1968, after a concession was authorized in November 1964. The original concessionaire was Impulsora de Televisión de Chihuahua, S.A. At the time, Chihuahua had just one television station, XHFI-TV channel 5, operated by Telesistema Mexicano. In contrast, XHCH-TV, and later its sister station XHIT-TV channel 4 which came on the air at the end of the 1960s, were part of the Tele-Cadena Mexicana system. Chihuahua was a rare duopoly in this system. In its early days channel 2 broadcast at an ERP of just one kilowatt; this was upgraded to five kilowatts in 1969. That year, despite the ambitions of its owners to create a local station, XHCH became an affiliate of Televisión Independiente de México.

Tele-Cadena Mexicana's stations were nationalized by decree in 1975. While XHIT linked up to the Canal 13 network from Mexico City, as would happen for almost all of the TCM stations, XHCH continued as a local station. It ran a wide variety of programs; its kids program Estrellitas del Dos debuted in 1970 and remained on air for 17 years. After the fusion of TIM and TSM in 1972, the station linked up to Mexico City's Canal 5 (as Televisa only had one Chihuahua station until the 1990s) and broadcast its diet of cartoons and sports programs.

In 1980 the station expanded to Ciudad Juárez with the launch of a satellite-fed retransmitter, XHCJE-TV channel 11.

=== Imevisión ===
In 1983, XHCH and XHCJE were rolled up into the new Instituto Mexicano de la Televisión. Under Imevisión, as the agency would rebrand in 1985, XHCH was disconnected from Canal 5, while XHIT became a full-time repeater of the channel 13 network. The launch of the new Red Nacional 7 in 1985 took place not over XHCH but on channel 11, among the first stations allotted for Televisión Rural de México (this station is now XHECH-TV).

Out of necessity XHCH became a local station in Imevisión — one of three, along with XHFN-TV Monterrey and XEIMT-TV Mexico City. It broadcast three and a half hours a day of local programming, including regional and municipal newscasts.

The station regularly aired Spanish broadcasts of the Sun Bowl, a famous college football bowl game held in El Paso, Texas. On December 30, 1989, much like the Heidi Game in the NFL/AFL, the station interrupted the broadcast of what was then known as the John Hancock Bowl with 6 minutes left to go to broadcast a recap of the 1989 Formula One season. The game was blacked out locally in El Paso on KDBC and wasn’t shown until 10:30pm MT.

=== Azteca ===
Upon the privatization of Imevisión and its transformation into Televisión Azteca in 1993, Chihuahua became the only city in the country where Azteca held three television stations—channels 2, 4 and 11.

Currently XHCH runs the Azteca Uno network, along with XHIT, though XHIT lacks local programming such as newscasts and is an hour behind XHCH.

== Technical information ==
XHCH-TDT broadcasts on RF channel 22 (virtual channel 2). It went digital-only on December 31, 2015.

XHCH also multicasts ADN 40 on digital subchannel 2.2.

=== Subchannels ===
Channel	Res.	Short name	Programming
1.1	1080i	XHCH	Azteca Uno-HD
1.2	480i	XHCH	ADN40

=== Repeater ===
XHCH has one repeater, located in Ciudad Delicias and operating with 11.570 kW ERP.
