= KTKB-LD =

Television station in Tamuning, Guam

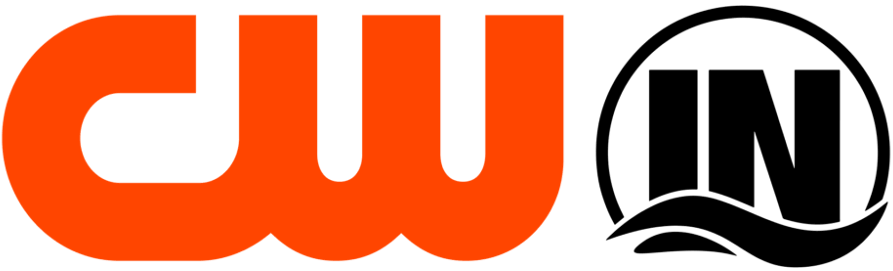
- Tamuning; Guam
- Channels: Digital: 26 (UHF); Virtual: 26
- Branding: CW IN

Programming
- Affiliations: 26.1: CW+

Ownership
- Owner: KM Communications
- Operator: Marianas Media
- Sister stations: KTKB-FM

History
- Founded: September 3, 2003
- First air date: April 20, 2009
- Former call signs: K26HK (1995–2004); KTKB-LP (2004–2010)
- Former channel number: Analog: 26 (UHF, 1995–2010)
- Former affiliations: CW+ (2009–2011); Universal Sports (secondary, 2009–2011); Dark (2011–2012)
- Call sign meaning: from sister station KTKB-FM

Technical information
- Licensing authority: FCC
- Facility ID: 131158
- Class: LD
- ERP: 1.4 kW
- HAAT: 27.5 m (90 ft)
- Transmitter coordinates: 13°29′15.9″N 144°49′36.2″E

Links
- Public license information: LMS
- Website: cwintv.com

KTKB-LD (channel 26) is a low-power television station licensed to Tamuning, Guam, serving the U.S. territory as an affiliate of The CW Plus. Owned by Chicago-based KM Communications, the station is operated by Marianas Media under a local marketing agreement (LMA). It is carried island-wide on cable channel 4 on MCV Broadband and GTA's GUdTV system.

Despite being a low-power television station, KTKB's signal covers all of Guam. It is also the territory's first fully digital commercial television station.

== History ==
The station went on the air on April 20, 2009, though it received its construction permit on September 3, 2003. Like most of the television stations in Guam, KTKB followed a Tuesday through Monday schedule for its CW prime time lineup because of Guam being a day ahead of the United States. However, it was the first station in Guam to air first-run syndicated fare and classic TV shows, most of them from the Sony Pictures Television library, though programming from Universal Media Studios and Warner Bros. Television was added in September 2009. By April 2010, other stations in Guam, notably KTGM and KEQI-LP, began adding syndicated product.

KTKB was one of the few stations to still sign off overnight, doing so at 1 a.m. It did not actually go off-the-air; rather, it simply showed station promos and public service announcements.

In March 2010, KTKB launched a half-hour newscast, Guam News Watch, which competed with KUAM News and Pacific News Center at 6 p.m. and 10 p.m. The newscast was canceled on January 4, 2011. On March 31, the station paused operations, returning to the air on January 9, 2012.

== Subchannel ==
Subchannel of KTKB-LD
Channel	Res.	Short name	Programming
26.1	720p	KTKB-HD	The CW Plus

== See also ==
- Channel 4 branded TV stations in the United States
- Channel 26 digital TV stations in the United States
- Channel 26 low-power TV stations in the United States
- Channel 26 virtual TV stations in the United States
