= William Tichenor =

American sea captain, settler, and politician (1813–1887)

- Born: William Clinton Tichenor; June 13, 1813; Newark, New Jersey, U.S.
- Died: 1887 (aged 73–74); San Francisco, California, U.S.
- Burial place: Tichenor Cemetery, Port Orford, Oregon
- Occupations: Sea captain, politician, settler
- Office: Member of the Illinois Senate (1848-1849)
- Spouse: Elizabeth Tichenor
- Children: At least 3 (known: Jacob B. Tichenor, Anna Dart, Sarah E. McGraw)

William Clinton Tichenor (June 13, 1813 – 1887) was an American sea captain and settler who played an early role in the attempted establishment of a coastal settlement at what became Port Orford, Oregon. He also served a term in the Illinois Senate during the 16th Illinois General Assembly. Accounts of his 1851 colonization effort and associated violence at Battle Rock have been strongly contested by later historians, who note that early retellings were often shaped into celebratory “foundational” narratives that obscured Indigenous perspectives and emphasized settler heroism.

== Early life and Illinois politics ==
Tichenor was born in Newark, New Jersey, on June 13, 1813. He later lived in Illinois and served as a state senator (9th district) in the 16th Illinois General Assembly (1848–1849).

== Maritime career and western migration ==
By the late 1840s, Tichenor traveled west during the California Gold Rush; an archival finding aid describes him traveling to California in 1849 and captaining coastal trade ships out of San Francisco. The same source associates him with early settlement activity around Humboldt Bay and the area that became Arcata.

== Port Orford settlement and Battle Rock ==
In 1851, Tichenor attempted to establish a coastal supply town at what would become Port Orford, Oregon. According to a reference article on Port Orford, he brought a small party of would-be settlers, departed to obtain supplies, and the initial group was driven off by local Tututni people who objected to the settlers’ presence; he later returned with a larger party and established the settlement.

A confrontation connected to this effort is remembered as the “Battle of Battle Rock.” The Oregon Encyclopedia stresses that the incident has often been framed as a heroic origin story in local tradition while Indigenous accounts and broader context were minimized; it also notes subsequent executions of Indigenous men at the site and the long afterlife of commemorations and reenactments in civic memory. Fitzhugh's study similarly situates Tichenor's project within a settler push that produced lethal conflict and a contested public mythology around the event.

== Land claim dispute and federal litigation ==
Tichenor and his wife later received a federal land patent (a Donation Land Claim) in Curry County, Oregon, dated February 5, 1866. In United States v. Tichenor (1880), the court considered a federal suit to set aside the patent as it related to a claimed “military reservation.” The opinion summarizes allegations that Tichenor and others forcibly expelled a federal agent from the reservation in 1864 and that he was arrested and imprisoned by military authorities (including detention at Alcatraz) in connection with the dispute. The opinion also states that a promise extracted under illegal arrest concerning future non-claim was void, and it addresses (and criticizes as insufficiently pleaded) broad allegations that the patent had been obtained by “fraud” through “false proof.”

== Legacy and historical assessment ==
Tichenor has been credited in regional histories with early settlement efforts in southern coastal Oregon and northern California. Modern scholarship and public history treatments have emphasized the violence, displacement, and mythmaking that accompanied colonization around Port Orford and Battle Rock, challenging earlier triumphalist retellings and incorporating fuller Indigenous context where the record permits.
