= Channel 26 virtual TV stations in Mexico =

The following television network and local stations operate on virtual channel 26 in Mexico:

== Regional networks ==
- TVMÁS in the state of Veracruz

== Local stations ==
- XHCGA-TDT in Aguascalientes, Aguascalientes
