= KDOV (FM) =

- Medford, Oregon; United States
- Broadcast area: Medford-Ashland, Oregon
- Frequency: 91.7 MHz
- Branding: The Dove

Programming
- Format: Christian Contemporary/ Religious

Ownership
- Owner: United Christian Broadcasters; (UCB USA, Inc.)

History
- First air date: August 16, 1958

Technical information
- Licensing authority: FCC
- Facility ID: 17460
- Class: C2
- ERP: 26,000 watts
- HAAT: −111 meters (−364 ft)
- Transmitter coordinates: 42°17′43.4″N 122°48′19.1″W
- Translator: See § Repeaters and translators

Links
- Public license information: Public file; LMS
- Webcast: Listen live
- Website: thedove.us

KDOV is a non-commercial radio station in Medford, Oregon, broadcasting to the Medford-Ashland, Oregon area on 91.7 FM. KDOV airs Christian contemporary music and religious programming. It is owned by United Christian Broadcasters, through licensee UCB USA, Inc.

KDOV has a sister television station, KDSO-LD.

== Programming ==
In addition to music blocks supervised by music director and on-air talent Jerry Bilden, TheDove Radio airs segments from various Christian ministers such as the late Charles Colson and Dr. Charles Stanley, Dr. James Kennedy and others. They also broadcast live local church services from Parkview Christian Center in Grants Pass. Flagship programs for TheDove include Mornings on TheDove and Focus Today (simulcast with the TV station and KCMX Radio), both hosted by station president Perry Atkinson. There also local news updates with news director Steve Johnson and news reporter Ashley Carrasco.

=== Local sports coverage ===
KDOV also serves as the flagship radio station for Cascade Christian High School varsity football and boys basketball with sports director Jim McCoy and talent Mark McLemore providing play-by-play. It debuted Cascade Christian baseball on May 29, 2012, with the OSAA Class 3A Playoff game against Bandon/Pacific and also carried the state championship game versus Santiam Christian just days later.

== On-Air Talent ==
- Perry Atkinson - Host, Mornings on TheDove, Focus Today, Afternoons on TheDove
- Jerry Bilden - Music Director / On-Air Talent
- Ashley Carrasco - News Anchor / Reporter, Mornings on TheDove (formerly on KTVL)

=== Former On-Air ===
- Steve Best - On-Air Talent
- Leon Hunsaker - Meteorologist (formerly of KOBI-TV and KTVL, died 2022)
- Steve Johnson - News Director / Co-Host, Mornings on TheDove
- Jim McCoy - Play-By-Play Commentator for Cascade Christian High School football and boys basketball (radio only)
- Demi DeSoto - News Anchor / Reporter, Mornings on TheDove (formerly on KTVL)
- Polina (Yemelyanova) Leiser - Co-Host / Executive Producer, Mornings on TheDove

== Board of directors ==
- Perry Atkinson, President
- Dallas Rhoden, Vice President
- Jason Atkinson, Secretary / Treasurer
- Hal Short, Chairman of the Board
- Mark Portrait, Director
- Ted Darnell, Director

== Repeaters and translators ==
The following full-power stations rebroadcast the main signal of KDOV:

Call sign	Frequency	City of license	FID	ERP (W)	HAAT	Class	Transmitter coordinates	FCC info
KDPO	91.9 FM	Port Orford, Oregon	173276	2,000	244 m (801 ft)	C3	42°51′53″N 124°26′54″W	LMS
KDCB	89.5 FM	Coos Bay, Oregon	176687	55	148 m (486 ft)	A	43°21′15.4″N 124°14′34.4″W	LMS
KDOB	91.5 FM	Brookings, Oregon	172931	430	347 m (1,138 ft)	A	42°7′22.3″N 124°18′0.3″W	LMS
KDJA	94.9 FM	Bend, Oregon	190435	2400	582 m (1,909 ft)	A	44°11′52.4″N 120°58′44.1″W	LMS

The following low-power FM translators relay the main signal of KDOV:

Broadcast translators for KDOV
Call sign	Frequency	City of license	FID	ERP (W)	Class	FCC info
K201DI	88.1 FM	Grants Pass, Oregon	81579	23	D	LMS
K221ED	92.1 FM	Medford, Oregon	142073	65	D	LMS
K272FM	102.3 FM	Azalea, Oregon	28318	10	D	LMS
K293AB	106.5 FM	Cave Junction, Oregon	28316	10	D	LMS
K293AU	106.5 FM	Yreka, California	146005	10	D	LMS

== See also ==
- Focus On The Family
- Moody Radio (In The Market with Janet Parshall)
