= W26CE =

Television station in New York City

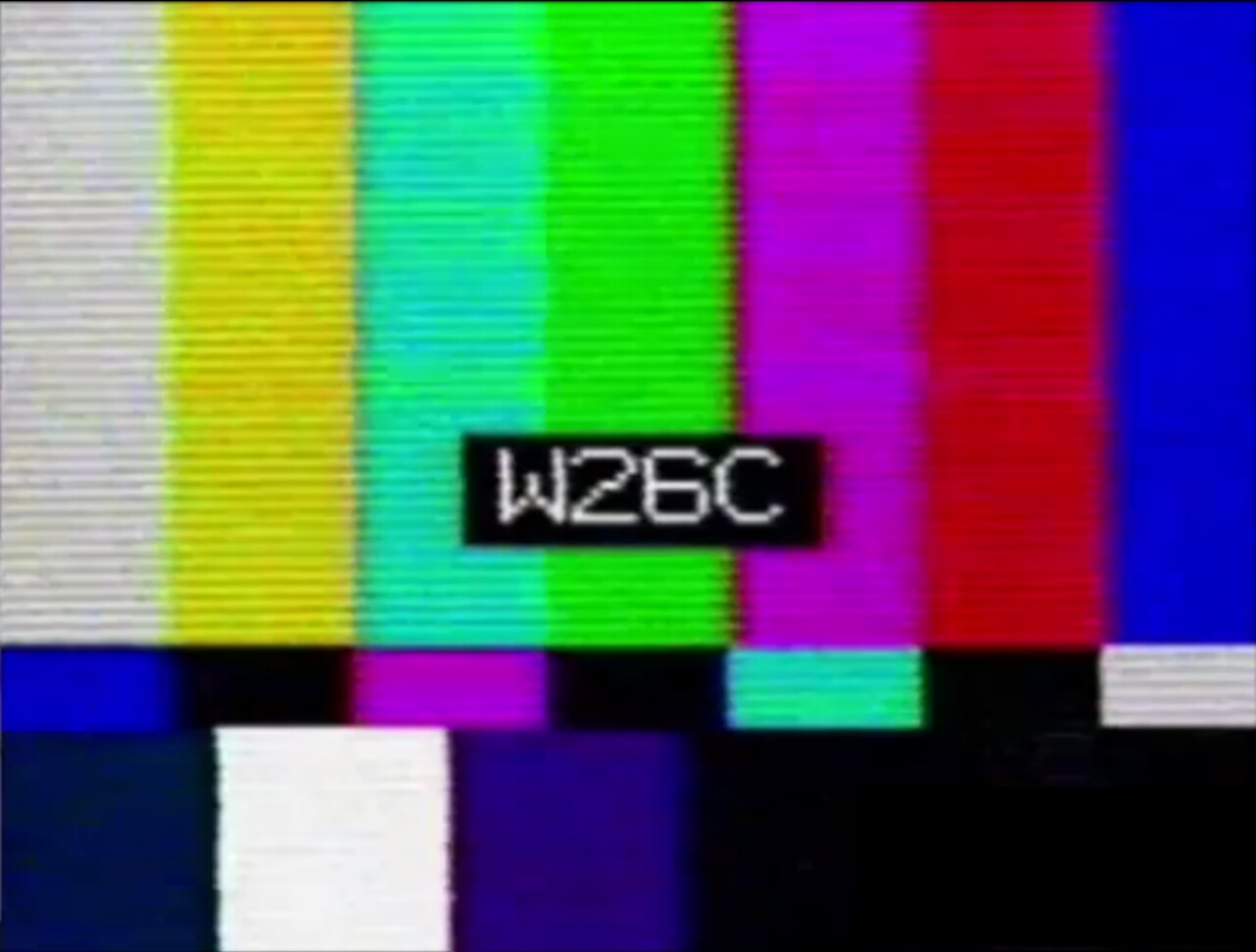
- W26CE test pattern
- New York, New York; United States
- Channels: Analog: 26 (UHF); Digital: 25 (UHF) (CP, never built)
- Branding: W26CE

Ownership
- Owner: Atlantic Coast Communications; (Atlantic Broadcasting Systems LLC)

History
- First air date: September 1, 1987
- Last air date: August 4, 2021 (license canceled)
- Former call signs: W19CF (1987–2001)
- Former channel number: Analog: 19 (1987–1998)
- Former affiliations: NBC (2001; temporarily fed from WNBC)

Technical information
- Licensing authority: FCC
- Facility ID: 47855
- Class: TX
- ERP: 1.5 kW
- HAAT: 135 m (443 ft)
- Transmitter coordinates: 40°51′18.2″N 72°46′8.9″W

Links
- Public license information: Public file; LMS

W26CE (channel 26) was a low-power television station in New York City, owned by Atlantic Coast Communications. The station's transmitter was located in Manorville, New York.

== History ==
W26CE signed on as W19CF on channel 19 on September 1, 1987. It was owned by Fordham University as a sister station to WFUV. After the September 11 attacks knocked out WNBC's terrestrial transmission equipment, W26CE was one of three UHF stations (alongside WLIW and WMBC-TV) that temporarily carried WNBC's over-the-air signal until WNBC was able to resume terrestrial transmissions from a transmitter in West Orange, New Jersey. W26CE was later sold to current owner Atlantic Coast Communications. After the sale was finalized, the audio format was taken off the air. The station was then on the air with SMPTE color bars without audio being played to fulfill Federal Communications Commission (FCC) requirements from time to time. W26CE was not required to transition to digital broadcasting in 2009 as it was not a full-power television station.

The FCC canceled W26CE's license on August 4, 2021, due to the station failing to obtain a license for digital operation by the July 13 deadline.
