= WMUN-LP =

- Muncie, Indiana; United States
- Channels: Analog: 26 (UHF)

Programming
- Affiliations: TBN

Ownership
- Owner: Full Gospel Business Men's Fellowship International; (Full Gospel Fellowship, Muncie Ind.)

History
- First air date: March 15, 1982
- Last air date: July 2010
- Former call signs: W32AC (1982–1995)
- Former channel numbers: Analog: 32 (UHF, 1982–2001)

Technical information
- Licensing authority: FCC
- Facility ID: 22860
- Class: TX
- ERP: 10.4 kW
- HAAT: 99 m (325 ft)
- Transmitter coordinates: 40°6′42.98″N 85°28′32″W

Links
- Public license information: LMS

WMUN-LP (channel 26) was a low-power television station in Muncie, Indiana, United States. It was a repeater that broadcast programming from the Trinity Broadcasting Network via satellite with local programs and was known as ACTS-TV (Abundant Christian Television Service).

== History ==
On March 15, 1982, the station signed on as W32AC, owned by Full Gospel Business Men's Fellowship International. It carried programs from the PTL Satellite Network. By 1993, it aired limited local programming and content from the Trinity Broadcasting Network (TBN). The station changed its call sign to WMUN-LP in 1995 and moved from channel 32 to channel 26 in 2001.

The station ceased operations sometime during the week of July 18, 2010, after a lightning strike. The station's license was canceled by the Federal Communications Commission (FCC) on October 25, 2011, and its call sign deleted from the FCC's database, due to the station having been silent for more than twelve months.
