= Channel 26 TV stations in Canada =

The following television stations broadcast on digital or analog channel 26 in Canada:

- CBUFT-DT in Vancouver, British Columbia
- CFTF-DT-10 in Baie-Saint-Paul, Quebec
- CHAU-DT-4 in Chandler, Quebec
- CHCO-TV in St. Andrews, New Brunswick
- CHWI-DT-60 in Windsor, Ontario
- CICO-DT-53 in Belleville, Ontario
- CIII-DT-4 in Owen Sound, Ontario
- CIVM-DT in Montreal, Quebec
- CKWS-TV-2 in Prescott, Ontario
