= Banana belt =

Warmer climate area within a larger region

A banana belt is any segment of a larger geographic region that enjoys warmer weather conditions than the region as a whole, especially in the wintertime. The term "banana belt" is broad enough that it can be used to describe everything from the entire Antarctic Peninsula, to the southern part of the American Midwest, to microclimate areas of mountain ranges.

Banana belts of the latter type may form on the lee sides of mountain slopes caused by orographic lift. When air rises over the top of a mountain range, it cools and releases moisture on the windward slope. As the air is pulled down the other side, it is compressed and heated via adiabatic heating, and it warms and dries territory in the mountain's rain shadow.

== Examples of banana belts ==
=== Canada ===
- Whitehorse in the Yukon
- Windsor and Essex County in Ontario
- The Niagara Peninsula in Ontario
- Brant County in southern Ontario
- Maple Creek in Saskatchewan
- Melita in Manitoba
- The southern Gulf Islands in the Strait of Georgia in British Columbia
- Chatham-Kent municipality in Ontario
- Victoria, British Columbia, along with Saanich, British Columbia, and surrounding areas in the region that forms Greater Victoria. It is considered the warmest metropolitan area in Canada, especially during the winter, with the fewest "frozen days".
- Annapolis Royal in the western part of Nova Scotia
- The stretch from Shelburne to Yarmouth in southwestern Nova Scotia
- Medicine Hat, Warner and Lethbridge in Alberta due to the influence of Chinook winds
- The cities of Kelowna, Penticton, and Vernon in the Okanagan region
- Osoyoos in the region of British Columbia Southern Interior
- Creston in Central Kootenay of British Columbia

=== United States ===
- Menominee, Escanaba, Manistique, and Iron Mountain, Michigan are in the banana belt of the Upper Peninsula of Michigan.
- The Arkansas River Valley in Colorado, located in the Rocky Mountains, east of the Continental Divide and below the Sawatch Range of 4,000 meter peaks, is often referred to as a banana belt. It includes the towns of Buena Vista, Salida, Parkdale, Cañon City to Pueblo, Colorado.
- The portion of the Oregon Coast region south of Port Orford is known as "Oregon's Banana Belt" because of its mild climate in relation to the rest of the coast. The largest communities in this region are Brookings-Harbor and Gold Beach.
- The Lewis-Clark Valley straddling the Washington/Idaho state line is known as the "Banana Belt of the Inland Pacific Northwest". The area includes Lewiston, Idaho and Clarkston, Washington. Both cities are located at the confluence of the Snake and Clearwater Rivers.
- The Treasure Valley area of Southwest Idaho that includes the capital of Boise, Idaho and surrounding communities is known as Idaho's Banana Belt. Residents enjoy year-round golfing, while being only a short drive away from skiing.

=== Europe ===
- Western Europe, and Northern Europe, including the United Kingdom and Ireland have mild winters due to the warming effects of the North Atlantic Current.

=== Australia ===
- In the cool season, due to the southeast Australian foehn, the southeastern coast of New South Wales, which includes cities such as Newcastle, Sydney, Wollongong, Batemans Bay, Merimbula, and Narooma, is relatively warmer than the inland regions of the state (i.e. Central Tablelands, South Western Slopes and the Central West).

== See also ==
- Chinook wind
- Foehn wind
- Hardiness zone
- List of belt regions of the United States
