= Azteca Uno =

Mexican national TV network

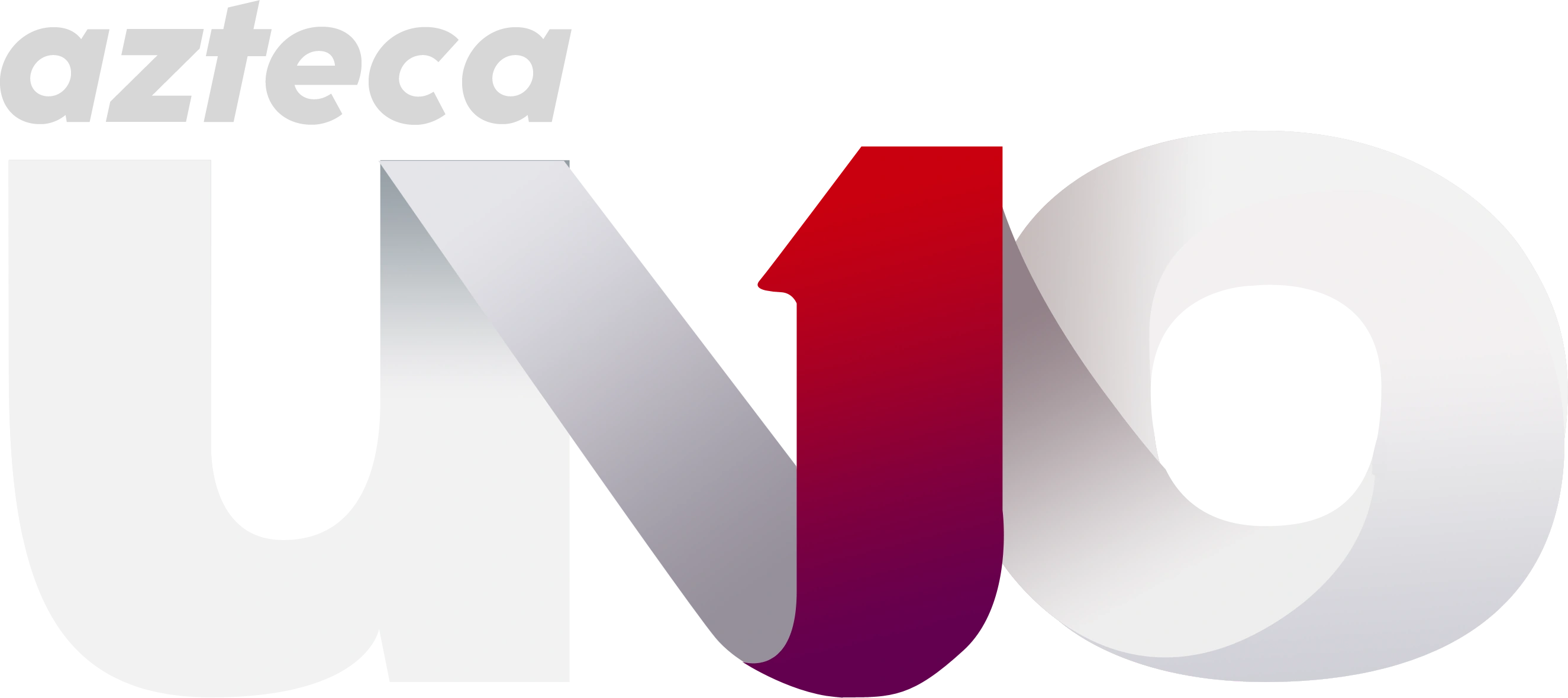
- Logo used since 2023
- Type: Terrestrial television network
- Country: Mexico
- Transmitters: see below

Programming
- Picture format: 1080i HDTV

Ownership
- Owner: TV Azteca
- Sister channels: Azteca 7; ADN Noticias; A Más

History
- Launched: 1 September 1968; 58 years ago
- Former names: Canal 13 (1968-1993); Canal 13 de Televisión Azteca (1993); Mi Tele (1993-1994); Canal Trece (1994-1997); TV 13 (1997-1998); Azteca Trece (1998-2018)

Links
- Website: www.tvazteca.com/aztecauno/

Availability

Terrestrial
- Digital terrestrial television: Channel 1

Azteca Uno (formerly Azteca Trece) is a Mexican national broadcast television network owned by TV Azteca, with more than 100 transmitters across the country. Azteca Uno broadcasts on virtual channel 1. Azteca Uno programming is available in Mexico on satellite via the Sky and Dish Network, as well as all Mexican cable systems, and some Azteca Uno programming were seen in the United States on Azteca América.

== History ==
=== Establishment of XHDF ===
Azteca Trece took its historic channel number (13) from XHDF-TV, which signed on in 1968 on channel 13. It was owned by Francisco Aguirre's Organización Radio Centro through concessionaire Corporación Mexicana de Radio y Televisión, S.A. de C.V. The station had fewer resources compared to its Mexico City competitors, Telesistema Mexicano and Televisión Independiente de México, and relied on foreign films and series, supplied primarily by Eurovision, to fill out its broadcast day.

In 1972, due to debts owed to the state-owned Sociedad Mexicana de Crédito Industrial (Mexican Industrial Credit Society or SOMEX), XHDF and concessionaire Corporación Mexicana de Radio y Televisión were nationalized.

The first director of the government-owned Canal 13 was Antonio Menéndez González, and after his death, he was succeeded by Enrique González Pedrero, senator of the state of Tabasco from the PRI. Corporación Mexicana de Radio y Televisión, along with another state-owned enterprise, Tele-Radio Nacional, began receiving new television concessions as part of a national expansion of the Mexico City station into a national television network.

One of the first orders of business for Canal 13 was a relocation. On 14 July 1976, Canal 13's new facilities in the Ajusco area of Mexico City were formally inaugurated by President Luis Echeverría. The event was attended by various figures from the political and business sectors of the country, including Secretary of the Interior Mario Moya Palencia and Secretary of Communications and Transportation Eugenio Méndez Docurro, as well as Emilio Azcárraga Milmo, Romulo O'Farrill and Miguel Aleman Velasco, who served as directors of Televisa.

In 1983, the Mexican government reorganized its broadcast holdings. The result was the creation of the Mexican Television Institute, which changed its name to Imevisión in 1985. Imevisión comprised not only Canal 13, now known as Red Nacional 13, but the former Televisión de la República Mexicana, with its channel 22 station, and a new network known as Red Nacional 7 and broadcast in Mexico City by the brand-new XHIMT-TV channel 7.

During the Imevisión years, Red Nacional 13 continued to broadcast commercial programming, although it featured some programs with a cultural focus, such as Temas de Garibay, Entre Amigos with Alejandro Aura, and several programs with journalist Jorge Saldaña.

=== Privatization ===
This Azteca Trece logo, with variations, was used between 1998 and 2007 and is based on the Mayan numeral for 13

In 1990, Imevisión collapsed the 7 and 13 national networks into one, retaining the stronger channel 13 branding. At this time, the first of two attempts to privatize Imevisión was made, meeting with no bidders.

In 1993, the administration of Carlos Salinas de Gortari auctioned off Imevisión and some other government-owned media ventures in various packages. Radio Televisión del Centro, headed by electronics store owner Ricardo Salinas Pliego, bought all of the TV stations. The result was the creation of Televisión Azteca, which took its name from the holding company created for the largest of the packages: the Red Nacional 13, including XHDF.

== Programs ==
Azteca Uno is the home of most of TV Azteca's domestic output, especially telenovelas, entertainment programs, and news.

=== Entertainment ===
Azteca Uno features two entertainment programs on its weekday schedule. Its morning show, Venga la Alegría, airs from 8:55 to noon and competes against similar offerings from Las Estrellas and Imagen Televisión. An afternoon show, Ventaneando, is more focused on entertainment news, and airs at 1pm.

=== News ===
Azteca Uno airs three editions of Hechos, Azteca's primary newscast, in the morning, at lunchtime and at 10pm. All three beat Televisa's competing newscasts in the ratings in September 2016.

== Azteca Internacional ==
A previous logo

The network also operates an international version of Azteca Trece as AZ Mundo (formerly Azteca 13 Internacional), reaching 13 countries in North, Central and South America. On 15 July 2004, the CRTC in Canada denied a request for Azteca 13 Internacional to be broadcast via digital cable and satellite. However, a second subsequent request was approved on 20 January 2006. On 15 September 2015, Azteca 13 International was renamed AZ Mundo. The channel is available in Canada on Rogers Digital Cable, Vidéotron and Bell Fibe TV. On 5 June 2023, the channel would be relaunched again as Azteca Internacional.

== Transmitters ==
Azteca Uno is available on 91 of its own transmitters as well as on a subchannel of 13 Azteca 7 transmitters. The latter only carry Azteca Uno in standard definition.

As part of the national virtual channel realignment of October 2016, Azteca Trece, including in Mexico City, moved from channel 13 to channel 1. The move allowed it to leapfrog Las Estrellas, its primary competitor, which remained on channel 2; it also ultimately led to the rename of the network as Azteca Uno effective 1 January 2018.

RF	VC	Call sign	Location	ERP
30	1	XHJCM-TDT	Aguascalientes, Ags.	15.89 kW
16	1	XHENE-TDT	Ensenada, BC	29.3 kW
28	1	XHAQ-TDT	Mexicali, BC	65.67 kW
21	1	XHFEC-TDT	San Felipe, BC	1.02 kW
28	1	XHJK-TDT	Tijuana, BC	151.03 kW
24	1	XHJCC-TDT	San José del Cabo, BCS	13.53 kW
26	1	XHCOC-TDT	Cd. Constitución, BCS	7.28 kW
21	1	XHAPB-TDT	La Paz, BCS	49.91 kW
29	1	XHGE-TDT	Campeche, Camp.	20.33 kW
35	1	XHGN-TDT	Ciudad del Carmen, Camp.	8.16 kW
29	1	XHPEH-TDT	Escárcega, Camp.	7.23 kW
21	1	XHCGJ-TDT	Cd. Camargo, Chih.	4.08 kW
34	1	XHCJE-TDT	Cd. Juárez, Chih.	52.1 kW
22	1	XHCH-TDT	Chihuahua, Chih.	51.47 kW
23	1	XHIT-TDT	Chihuahua, Chih.	51.41 kW
22	1	XHCH-TDT	Delicias, Chih.	51.47 kW
23	1	XHIT-TDT	Delicias, Chih.	51.41 kW
25	1	XHHPC-TDT	Hidalgo del Parral, Chih.	8.97 kW
24	1	XHCGC-TDT	Nuevo Casas Grandes, Chih.	9.63 kW
16	1	XHHR-TDT	Ojinaga, Chih.	2.51 kW
25	1	XHHE-TDT	Cd. Acuña, Coah.	4.21 kW
24	1	XHHC-TDT	Monclova, Coah.	11.69 kW
29	1	XHPFC-TDT	Parras, Coah.	10.92 kW
26	1	XHCJ-TDT	Sabinas, Coah.	9.98 kW
19	1	XHWX-TDT	Saltillo, Coah.	13.605 kW
39	1	XHGDP-TDT	Torreón, Coah.	188.17 kW
43	1	XHKF-TDT	Colima, Col.	24.14 kW
21	1	XHDR-TDT	Manzanillo, Col.	10.47 kW
22	1	XHTCA-TDT	Tecomán, Col.	4.560 kW
25	1	XHDF-TDT	Mexico City	468.030 kW
22	1	XHVEL-TDT	Cuéncame, Dgo.	4.57 kW
26	1	XHDB-TDT	Durango, Dgo.	12.83 kW
45	1	XHGVH-TDT	Guadalupe Victoria, Dgo.	4.83 kW
27	1	XHPAP-TDT	Santiago Papasquiaro, Dgo.	1.79 kW
33	1	XHMAS-TDT	Celaya, Gto.	100.27 kW
48	1	XHIE-TDT	Acapulco, Gro.	36.48 kW
24	1	XHCER-TDT	Chilpancingo, Gro.	17.66 kW
41	1	XHIR-TDT	Iguala, Gro.	6.19 kW
23	1	XHIB-TDT	Taxco, Gro.	7.18 kW
22	1	XHDU-TDT	Zihuatanejo, Gro.	42.68 kW
25	1	XHDF-TDT	Pachuca, Hgo.	1.22 kW
46	1	XHTGN-TDT	Tulancingo, Hgo.	9.99 kW
33	1	XHJAL-TDT	Guadalajara, Jal.	109.19 kW
25	1	XHGJ-TDT	Puerto Vallarta, Jal.	19.27 kW
27	1	XHXEM-TDT	Toluca/Jocotitlán, Mex.	92.8 kW
26	1	XHLCM-TDT	Lazaro Cárdenas, Mich.	9.18 kW
24	1	XHCBM-TDT	Pátzcuaro, Mich. (Cerro Burro)	66.42 kW
27	1	XHCUR-TDT	Cuernavaca, Mor.	239.83 kW
30	1	XHAF-TDT	Tepic, Nay.	24 kW
19	1	XHWX-TDT	Monterrey, NL	429.706 kW
33	1	XHJN-TDT	Huajuapan de León, Oax.	5.36 kW
25	1	XHIG-TDT	Matías Romero, Oax. (Cerro Palma Sola)	48.21 kW
26	1	XHDG-TDT	Oaxaca, Oax.	58 kW
24	1	XHINC-TDT	Pinotepa Nacional, Oax.	4.41 kW
33	1	XHPCE-TDT	Puerto Escondido, Oax.	
46	1	XHSCO-TDT	Salina Cruz, Oax.	3.33 kW
24	1	XHPUR-TDT	Puebla, Pue.	53.51 kW
28	1	XHTHN-TDT	Tehuacán, Pue.	17.36 kW
26	1	XHQUR-TDT	Querétaro, Qro.	301.070 kW
25	1	XHAQR-TDT	Cancún, Q. Roo	38.97 kW
23	1	XHBX-TDT	Chetumal, Q. Roo	8.54 kW
26	1	XHPMS-TDT	Matehuala, SLP	4.44 kW
28	1	XHDD-TDT	San Luis Potosí, SLP	43.42 kW
24	1	XHTZL-TDT	Tamazunchale, SLP	5.05 kW
21	1	XHTAZ-TDT	Tamazunchale, SLP	5.06 kW
32	1	XHCUA-TDT	Culiacán, Sin.	36.7 kW
27	1	XHMSI-TDT	Los Mochis, Sin.	45.49 kW
34	1	XHLSI-TDT	Mazatlán, Sin.	38.31 kW
33	1	XHCSO-TDT	Cd. Obregón, Son.	38.46 kW
21	1	XHHN-TDT	Guaymas, Son.	12.34 kW
24	1	XHHSS-TDT	Hermosillo, Son.	38.950 kW
15	1	XHFA-TDT	Nogales, Son.	77.34 kW
44	1	XHVHT-TDT	Villahermosa, Tab.	18.79 kW
23	1	XHBY-TDT	Ciudad Mante, Tamps.	8.45 kW
24	1	XHCVT-TDT	Ciudad Victoria, Tamps.	17.08 kW
12	1	XHMTA-TDT	Matamoros, Tamps.	75.123 kW
23	1	XHLNA-TDT	Nuevo Laredo, Tamps.	75.123 kW
36	1	XHREY-TDT	Reynosa, Tamps.	61.24 kW
21	1	XHFET-TDT	San Fernando, Tamps.	0.9 kW
28	1	XHHP-TDT	Soto La Marina, Tamps.	5.09 kW
29	1	XHWT-TDT	Tampico, Tamps.	30.2 kW
32	1	XHAZL-TDT	Cerro Azul, Ver.	4.5 kW
43	1	XHBE-TDT	Coatzacoalcos, Ver.	50.58 kW
31	1	XHIC-TDT	Cofre de Perote, Ver.	239.46 kW
33	1	XHSTV-TDT	Santiago Tuxtla, Ver.	15.16 kW
31	1	XHDH-TDT	Mérida, Yuc.	97.952 kW
23	1	XHKYU-TDT	Valladolid/Kahua, Yuc.	4.76 kW
34	1	XHKC-TDT	Fresnillo, Zac.	9.230 kW
27	1	XHCPZ-TDT	Sombrerete, Zac.	9.13 kW
46	1	XHLVZ-TDT	Zacatecas, Zac.	40.94 kW
