= KTKB-FM =

Radio station in Hagåtña, Guam

KTKB-FM (Megamixx 101.9)
Dededo, Guam; Guam
- Broadcast area: Guam
- Frequency: 101.9 MHz
- Branding: Megamixx 101.9

Programming
- Format: OPM, Adult CHR (Top 40), Hot AC

Ownership
- Owner: KM Broadcasting of Guam, LLC

History
- First air date: June 1, 2003
- Call sign meaning: KT; 101.9 KB (former branding)

Technical information
- Class: C2
- ERP: 46,000 watts
- HAAT: 156 meters
- Transmitter coordinates: 13.487778°N 144.826667°E

Links
- Website: http://www.ktkb.com/

KTKB-FM, (101.9 FM) branded as Megamixx 101.9, is the first Filipino format station in the United States territory of Guam.

== History ==
It was built in late 2002 by Rolly Manuntag—working for its owners from Skokie, Illinois—and officially opened on June 2, 2003.

== DJs ==
Current:

- Doods of The Radio Breakfast eXtreme Show
- Rolly M. of Middays with Rolly M.
- Arnold of The Afternoon Shift: Plug n' Play Show
- Migz of The Flipside: Happy Hapon Show
- DJ Cure of The GroovyNights Show
- Damdaming Pinoy
- DJ Tass of The Saturday Show
- Tita Gloria Diaz of The Dear Heart Show
- Kumusta Kabayan

Former:

- Love Lines
- The Bro Show
- Mr Craig of The GroovyNights Show
- Initial V of The Saturday Showtime
- Lady D of The Saturday Escapade Show
- Johnny Z. of The i m radio (international music radio) Show

== Format names ==
Branding	Years active
101.9KB FM	June 1, 2003 – 2004
101.9 Megamixx FM	Early 2004–Late 2009
Megamixx 101.9	Late 2009–present
