= KDOV-LD =

Television station in Medford, Oregon

KDOV-LD and KDSO-LD

Medford, Oregon; United States
- Channels for KDOV-LD: Digital: 18 (UHF); Virtual: 18
- Channels for KDSO-LD: Digital: 24 (UHF); Virtual: 24
- Branding: theDove TV

Programming
- Affiliations: Religious

Ownership
- Owner: theDove Media, Inc.
- Sister stations: KDOV (FM), KKPM-CD, KDRC-LD, KFTY-LD

History
- Founded: KDOV-LD: October 18, 2001; KDSO-LD: August 16, 2005
- First air date: KDOV-LD: September 27, 2004; KDSO-LD: September 3, 2008
- Former call signs: KDOV-LD: K18GB (2001–2013); K18GB-D (2013–2017); KDSO-LD: K44IA (2005–2009); KDOV-LP (2009–2018); KDSO-LP (2018)
- Former channel number: KDOV-LD: Analog: 18 (UHF, 2008–2013); KDSO-LD: Analog: 44 (UHF, 2008–2018); Digital: 16 (UHF, 2018–2022); Virtual: 43, 16
- Call sign meaning: KDOV-LD: Dove; KDSO-LD: Dove Southern Oregon

Technical information
- Licensing authority: FCC
- Facility ID: KDOV-LD: 129254; KDSO-LD: 125327
- Class: LD
- ERP: KDOV-LD: 1.56 kW; KDSO-LD: 1.54 kW
- HAAT: 403.6 m (1,324 ft)
- Transmitter coordinates: 42°17′52.5″N 122°45′5″W
- Translator: see § Translators

Links
- Public license information: KDOV-LD: LMS
- Website: www.thedove.us

KDOV-LD (channel 18), branded theDove TV, is a low-power religious television station in Medford, Oregon, United States. KDSO-LD (channel 16) serves as a translator of KDOV-LD. The stations are owned by theDove Media alongside KDOV (91.7 FM) in Medford, KDRC-LD (channel 26) in Redding, California, and KKPM-CD in Yuba City, which operates a network of low-power translators throughout Northern California and airs theDove TV on the primary channel of most of these translators.

== Programming ==
KDOV-LD/KDSO-LD broadcasts a schedule of local and national Christian programs, including those from Christian Broadcasting Network, which produces news and informational programming, including CBN NewsWatch, Christian World News, The 700 Club (which also aired daily on CBS affiliate KTVL [channel 10] in Medford until September 2012 when it moved over to Fox affiliate KMVU [channel 26]) and 700 Club Interactive. Local programming featured includes Mornings on theDove and Focus Today (both simulcasts with KDOV radio) and news updates throughout the day.

They have also broadcast programs from LeSEA Broadcasting in the past.

== Subchannels ==
Subchannels of KDOV-LD and KDSO-LD
Channel		Res	Short name	Programming
KDOV-LD	KDSO-LD	Res	Short name	Programming
18.1	24.1	1080i	theDove	Main programming
18.2	24.2	1080i	NewsMax	Newsmax2
18.3	24.3	480i	CBNnews	CBN News
18.4	24.4	480i	NRB-TV	NRB TV

== Translators ==
- KBND-LD Bend (translates KDOV-LD)
- KKRM-LD Chico, CA (translates KKPM-CD)
- KFTY-LD Middletown, CA (translates KKPM-CD)
- K14TG-D Monterey, CA (translates KKPM-CD)
- KFMY-LD Petaluma, CA (translates KKPM-CD)
- K02QP-D Planada, CA (translates KKPM-CD)
- K16IW-D Redding, CA (translates KKPM-CD)
- KRDT-CD Redding, CA (translates KKPM-CD)
- K04RS-D Salinas, CA (translates KKPM-CD)
- KURK-LD San Francisco, CA (translates KKPM-CD)
- KQSL-LD San Francisco–San Rafael, CA (translates KKPM-CD)
- KQRO-LD San Jose–Morgan Hill, CA (translates KKPM-CD)
- KUKR-LD Santa Rosa, CA (translates KKPM-CD)
- KYUB-LD Yuba City, CA (translates KKPM-CD)

== Awards ==
In 2011, theDove TV was the recipient of the National Religious Broadcasters' prestigious Low Power Television Station of the Year.

In 2022, theDove TV received another NRB Low Power Television Station of the Year.

== YouTube removal, then reinstatement ==
On March 22, 2021, theDove TV was removed from and banned permanently by YouTube. This was as result of claims that theDove was repeatedly violating their "COVID-19 misinformation and presidential election integrity policies" that were added to its "community standards" around the time of the 2020 United States presidential election.

A spokesperson for YouTube stated, "Any channel that violates these policies will receive a strike, which temporarily restricts uploading or live-streaming. Channels that receive three strikes in the same 90-day period will be permanently removed from YouTube. If a channel owner feels the strike was made in error, they can appeal the decision." The appeal was made, but denied by YouTube. A claim of ownership to the videos was also made, but it, too, was denied.

However, nearly four years later in October 2024, theDove TV (along with several other channels that were taken down and removed for similar "violations") was reinstated by YouTube.

== See also ==
- Christian Broadcasting Network
- National Religious Broadcasters
- United Christian Broadcasters
