= KDRC-LD =

Television station in Redding, California

- Redding, California; United States
- Channels: Digital: 26 (UHF); Virtual: 26

Programming
- Affiliations: 26.1: theDove TV; for others, see § Subchannels

Ownership
- Owner: theDove Media, Inc.
- Sister stations: KKPM-CD / KKRM-CD / KRDT-CD / K16IW-D

History
- Founded: 1993
- First air date: October 1997
- Former call signs: K26CO (1993–1998); KGEC-LP (1998–2013); KGEC-LD (2013–2022)
- Former channel numbers: Analog: 26 (UHF, 1998–2013)
- Former affiliations: America One (1998–2000); FamilyNet (2000–2010); Jewelry Television (overnights); NASA TV (1997–2020); Retro TV (2010–2021)
- Call sign meaning: theDove Redding–Chico

Technical information
- Licensing authority: FCC
- Facility ID: 34581
- Class: LD
- ERP: 7.5 kW
- HAAT: 524.3 m (1,720 ft)
- Transmitter coordinates: 40°39′14.5″N 122°31′30″W

Links
- Public license information: LMS
- Website: www.thedove.us

KDRC-LD (channel 26) is a low-power religious television station in Redding, California, United States. The station is owned by Medford, Oregon–based theDove Media, Inc.

== History ==
=== Origins ===
Former logo (2000–2010)

The station began as KGEC-LP in the late 1990s. Fresno businessman George E. Cooper and his wife Millie founded Cooper Communications, LLC, in 1993 upon moving to the Redding area. KGEC signed on for the first time in late October 1997 and became an America One network affiliate on January 14, 1998, and would remain so until that network went to KMCA-LP in 2000. It would begin local coverage of Golden State Warriors NBA basketball in 1999 and would last just one season. The station's call letters were the initials of Cooper, the station's primary founder. He was quoted as saying, "We love the market and the people, and will do everything we can to serve it well!"

On July 1, 2000, KGEC-LP became an affiliate of the fledgling FamilyNet, a faith-based, family-oriented network. This brought more family-friendly programming that had been lacking among its major competition. KGEC-LP began promoting themselves as "FamilyTV 26" to coincide with FamilyNet. Because of FamilyNet's ownership, management and programming changes, KGEC-LP severed ties with FamilyNet on January 4, 2010, and became a full-time affiliate of Retro TV, which airs classic television series to keep with the station's tradition of providing good quality television.

On February 17, 2005, KGEC-LP co-founder and chief executive officer George Cooper died after a long battle with cancer. His widow and station president, Millie, would assume the role of primary owner and CEO as well.

In March 2011, KGEC-LP was granted its digital license on channel 26 for four virtual channels and provides family-friendly programs from Retro TV (26.1), Tuff TV (26.2), The Family Channel (26.3) and NASA Television (26.4). It also aired Jewelry Television in the overnight hours on 26.1, 26.3 and 26.4 until 2020. Subchannel 26.2 later changed to The Action Channel and 26.4 has since gone dark.

Later in 2011, KGEC-LP was sold to another group, but they basically ran the station as a repeater for Retro TV, causing the station to lose money. However, Millie Cooper-Brogan, widow of founder George Cooper, bought the station back in 2014 in hopes of finding new ownership. KGEC-LD once again flies under the Cooper Communications banner. Mrs. Brogan reassumed the position of owner, president and general manager while Jim McKeown served as the station's chief engineer until his death in January 2021.

=== theDove TV affiliation and changes ===
On May 21, 2021, KGEC-LD officially became an affiliate of theDove TV, based out of Medford, Oregon, and owned by theDove Media, LLC. They joined two other Redding stations KRDT-CD Channel 23 (repeater for One Ministries, Inc.-owned KKPM-CD in Yuba City) and K16IW-CD Channel 16.1 (also owned by theDove Media) as a repeater station broadcasting theDove TV. The official announcement was made during Mornings on theDove the following Monday. The network now provides its full content to KGEC-LD and a possible ownership change of the station could be finalized in the coming months pending FCC approval.

KGEC-LD was officially sold to theDove Media of Medford in February 2022. The call sign changed to the current KDRC-LD on June 11, 2022. As of January 2024, KDRC subchannel 26.2 airs Newsmax2.

== Subchannels ==
The station's signal is multiplexed:

Subchannels of KDRC-LD
| Channel | Res. | Short name | Programming |
|---|---|---|---|
| 26.1 | 1080i | theDove | theDove TV |
| 26.2 | 1080i | NewsMax | Newsmax2 |
| 26.3 | 480i | CBNnews | CBN News |
| 26.4 | 480i | NRB-TV | NRB TV |
