= National Register of Historic Places listings in Curry County, Oregon =

Location of Curry County in Oregon

This list presents the full set of buildings, structures, objects, sites, or districts designated on the National Register of Historic Places in Curry County, Oregon, United States, and offers brief descriptive information about each of them. The National Register recognizes places of national, state, or local historic significance across the United States. Out of over 90,000 National Register sites nationwide, Oregon is home to over 2,000, and 47 of those are found in Curry County.

This National Park Service list is complete through NPS recent listings posted April 3, 2026.

== Current listings ==
	Name on the Register	Image	Date listed	Location	City or town	Description
1	35-CU-215–High Point Shell Midden		March 6, 2001 (#01000135)	Address restricted	Carpenterville vicinity	This shell midden is located on a strategic high point overlooking the Pacific coast, and is visible in the eroding cliff face. Radiocarbon dating indicates that the site was occupied c. 1070 CE and again c. 1385 CE, but additional dating may extend this chronology.
2	Arch Rock	Arch Rock	September 10, 1997 (#97001058)	Address restricted	Carpenterville	
3	Archeological Site 35CU1		September 10, 1997 (#97001043)	Address restricted	Sixes	
4	Archeological Site 35CU13		September 10, 1997 (#97001045)	Address restricted	Port Orford	
5	Archeological Site 35CU14		September 10, 1997 (#97001046)	Address restricted	Port Orford	
6	Archeological Site 35CU142		September 10, 1997 (#97001050)	Address restricted	Port Orford	
7	Archeological Site 35CU153		September 10, 1997 (#97001049)	Address restricted	Port Orford	
8	Archeological Site 35CU16		September 10, 1997 (#97001048)	Address restricted	Port Orford	
9	Archeological Site 35CU31		September 10, 1997 (#97001055)	Address restricted	Pistol River	
10	Archeological Site 35CU69		September 10, 1997 (#97001066)	Address restricted	Carpenterville	
11	Archeological Site 35CU79		September 10, 1997 (#97001070)	Address restricted	Brookings	
12	Archeological Site 35CU80		September 10, 1997 (#97001069)	Address restricted	Brookings	
13	Archeological Site 35CU83		September 10, 1997 (#97001042)	Address restricted	Sixes	
14	Blacklock Point Lithic Site		August 5, 1994 (#94000805)	Address restricted	Port Orford	
15	Blacklock Point Shell Midden		August 5, 1994 (#94000804)	Address restricted	Port Orford	
16	Cape Blanco Lighthouse	Cape Blanco Lighthouse	April 21, 1993 (#73002339)	Westernmost part of Cape Blanco, W of Sixes; 42°50′14″N 124°33′44″W	Sixes	
17	Cape Blanco Lithic Site		June 4, 1992 (#92000667)	Address restricted	Port Orford	
18	Central Building	Central Building	April 1, 1980 (#80003309)	703 Chetco Ave. 42°03′06″N 124°16′55″W	Brookings	Built in 1915 by the C&O Lumber Company, the Central Building served as administration building for the Brookings Land & Townsite Co. in the mill town of Brookings.
19	Eagle Rock		September 10, 1997 (#97001054)	Address restricted	Pistol River	
20	Gold Beach Ranger Station	Gold Beach Ranger Station	April 8, 1986 (#86000818)	29279 Ellensburg Avenue; 42°24′07″N 124°25′08″W	Gold Beach	The Cascadian Rustic buildings of the Gold Beach Ranger Station were built in 1936 by a Civilian Conservation Corps crew from Gasquet, California.
21	Zane Grey Cabin (Note: The National Register announcement of listing for the Zane Grey Cabin incorrectly states that it is located in Josephine County. The cabin is in fact in Curry County.)	Zane Grey Cabin	June 28, 2016 (#16000413)	North bank of the Rogue River; 42°42′07″N 123°48′17″W	Galice vicinity	Zane Grey (1872–1939), the master author of the American West, built this cabin on the lower Rogue River in 1926 and used it as a frequent retreat until 1935. He both wrote here and used the surrounding landscapes as inspiration for works such as Tales of Freshwater Fishing, Rogue River Feud, and the article "Shooting the Rogue".
22	Harris Park Mound		September 10, 1997 (#97001068)	Address restricted	Brookings	
23	Patrick Hughes House	Patrick Hughes House	November 28, 1980 (#80003310)	Cape Blanco State Park; 42°50′33″N 124°32′13″W	Sixes	The Hughes House, which combines elements of the Queen Anne and Stick-Eastlake architectural styles, was designed by P.J. Lindberg and built in 1898.
24	Mary D. Hume	Mary D. Hume	August 1, 1979 (#79002052)	Port of Gold Beach; 42°25′18″N 124°25′06″W	Gold Beach	Steamer built in 1880 in Gold Beach, wrecked at Gold Beach
25	Indian Sands		September 10, 1997 (#97001061)	Address restricted	Carpenterville	
26	Indian Sands		June 4, 1992 (#92000668)	Address restricted	Brookings	
27	Khustenete-Hustenate-Xusteneten		September 10, 1997 (#97001057)	Address restricted	Carpenterville	
28	Peter John Lindberg House	Peter John Lindberg House	January 7, 2015 (#14001131)	906 N. Washington Street; 42°44′46″N 124°29′44″W	Port Orford	Destroyed by fire in 2021.
29	Little Ridge-Cape Sebastian (35CU77)		September 10, 1997 (#97001051)	Address restricted	Pistol River	
30	Little Ridge-Cape Sebastian (35CU78)		September 10, 1997 (#97001052)	Address restricted	Pistol River	
31	Lone Ranch Creek Mound		September 10, 1997 (#97001067)	Address restricted	Brookings	
32	Miller Creek		September 10, 1997 (#97001059)	Address restricted	Carpenterville	Also known as the Miller Shell Midden.
33	Newburgh Lithic Site (35CU209)		September 10, 1997 (#97001041)	Address restricted	Sixes	
34	Pistol River Site-Chetlessentan-Chetleshin-Chet-less-chun-dunn	Pistol River Site-Chetlessentan-Chetleshin-Chet-less-chun-dunn	September 10, 1997 (#97001053)	Atop bluffs immediately north of the mouth of the Pistol River; 42°16′52″N 124°24′05″W	Pistol River	
35	Port Orford City Jail		April 29, 2025 (#100011755)	7th Street near Jefferson Street, No Street Number; 42°44′39″N 124°29′34″W	Port Orford	
36	Port Orford Coast Guard Station	Port Orford Coast Guard Station	May 29, 1998 (#98000606)	92331 Coast Guard Hill Rd. 42°44′23″N 124°30′33″W	Port Orford	
37	Port Orford Site		September 10, 1997 (#97001044)	Address restricted	Port Orford	
38	Rogue River Bridge No. 01172	Rogue River Bridge No. 01172	August 5, 2005 (#05000814)	OR Coast 9, US 101, MP 327.70; 42°25′39″N 124°24′44″W	Gold Beach	Also known as the Isaac Lee Patterson Bridge.
39	Rogue River Ranch	Rogue River Ranch	December 29, 1975 (#75001581)	E of Agness near confluence of Mule Creek and Rogue River; 42°43′06″N 123°52′53″W	Agness	
40	Sheep Trail Shell Midden (35CU32)		September 10, 1997 (#97001056)	Address restricted	Carpenterville	
41	Sixes Hotel	Sixes Hotel	October 22, 1992 (#92001325)	93316 Sixes River Rd. 42°49′04″N 124°28′50″W	Sixes	
42	Thunder Rock		September 10, 1997 (#97001060)	Address restricted	Carpenterville	
43	Whale Head	Whale Head	September 10, 1997 (#97001062)	Address restricted	Carpenterville	
44	Whaleshead Lithic Site (35CU207)		September 10, 1997 (#97001064)	Address restricted	Carpenterville	
45	Whaleshead South Midden (35CU208)		September 10, 1997 (#97001063)	Address restricted	Carpenterville	
46	Whaleshead Trail Viewpoint (35CU36)	Whaleshead Trail Viewpoint (35CU36)	September 10, 1997 (#97001065)	Address restricted	Carpenterville	
47	Wheeler Ridge Japanese Bombing Site	Wheeler Ridge Japanese Bombing Site	July 6, 2006 (#06000589)	Rogue River-Siskiyou National Forest; 42°04′42″N 124°06′40″W	Brookings	Site of only deliberate bombing in the contiguous United States by foreign airplane

== Former listings ==
	Name on the Register	Image	Date listed	Date removed	Location	City or town	Description
1	Archeological Site 35CU156		September 10, 1997 (#97001047)	April 29, 2010	Address restricted	Port Orford	

== See also ==
- National Register of Historic Places listings in Oregon
- Listings in neighboring counties: Coos, Del Norte, Douglas, Josephine
- Historic preservation
- History of Oregon
- Lists of Oregon-related topics
