= High Point Shell Midden =

- 35-CU-215–High Point Shell Midden
- U.S. National Register of Historic Places
- Location: Address restricted (Note: Federal and state laws and practices restrict general public access to information regarding the specific location of this resource. In some cases, this is to protect archeological sites from vandalism, while in other cases it is restricted at the request of the owner.)
- Nearest city: Carpenterville, Oregon
- Area: 1.0 acre (0.40 ha)
- MPS: Native American Archeological Sites of the Oregon Coast MPS
- NRHP reference No.: 01000135
- Added to NRHP: March 6, 2001

The High Point Shell Midden (Smithsonian trinomial: 35CU215) is a prehistoric archeological site located in Samuel H. Boardman State Scenic Corridor near Carpenterville, Oregon, United States. The midden is located on a strategic high point overlooking the Pacific coast, and is visible in the eroding cliff face. Radiocarbon dating indicates that the site was occupied c. 1070 CE and again c. 1385 CE, but additional dating may extend this chronology. Although shell deposits are evident without excavation, it is likely that evidence of other activities related to site occupation may be found on the periphery of the midden. The site has potential to produce scientific data related to several topics, including "site formation processes, landscape evolution, and changes in settlement, subsistence, technology, and society among the Native American cultures of the Oregon Coast."

The High Point Shell Midden was listed on the National Register of Historic Places in 2001.

== See also ==
- National Register of Historic Places listings in Curry County, Oregon
