= The Heads =

The Heads may refer to:

== Music ==
- The Heads (British band), a stoner rock band
- The Heads (New York band), a psychedelic rock band
- The Heads, a band made up of former members of Talking Heads

== Places ==
- The Heads (Oregon), a cape off the Oregon Coast in the U.S.
- Sydney Heads, the entrance to Sydney Harbour in Australia
