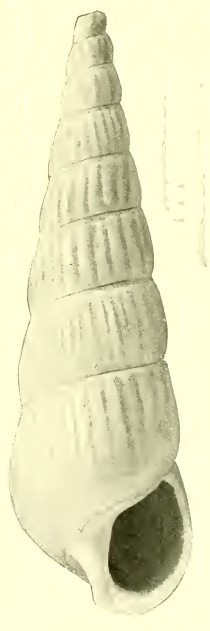
- Drawing of a shell of Turbonilla hannibali

Scientific classification
- Kingdom: Animalia
- Phylum: Mollusca
- Class: Gastropoda
- Family: Pyramidellidae
- Genus: Turbonilla
- Species: T. hannibali

Binomial name
- Turbonilla hannibali Bartsch, 1917

Synonyms
- Turbonilla (Pyrgolampros) hannibali Bartsch, 1917

= Turbonilla hannibali =

Species of gastropod

Turbonilla hannibali is a species of sea snail, a marine gastropod mollusk in the family Pyramidellidae, the pyrams and their allies.

== Description ==
The yellowish-white shell has an elongate conic shape. Its length measures 9 mm. The whorls of the protoconch are decollated. The nine whorls of the teleoconch are almost flattened. They are narrowly shouldered at the summit. They are marked by ill-defined indications of axial ribs, which are entirely too poorly developed to permit counting. The spiral sculpture consists of slender, closely spaced striations. The sutures are strongly impressed. The periphery of the body whorl is obtusely angulated. The base of the shell is moderately long, and well rounded. it is marked like the spire. The aperture is broadly oval. The posterior angle is acute. The inner lip is almost vertical, somewhat sinuous, and slightly reflected.

== Distribution ==
The typer specimen was found in the Upper Pliocene "Elk River beds", at the mouth of Elk River at Port Orford, Oregon.
