= Sixes Hotel =

- U.S. National Register of Historic Places
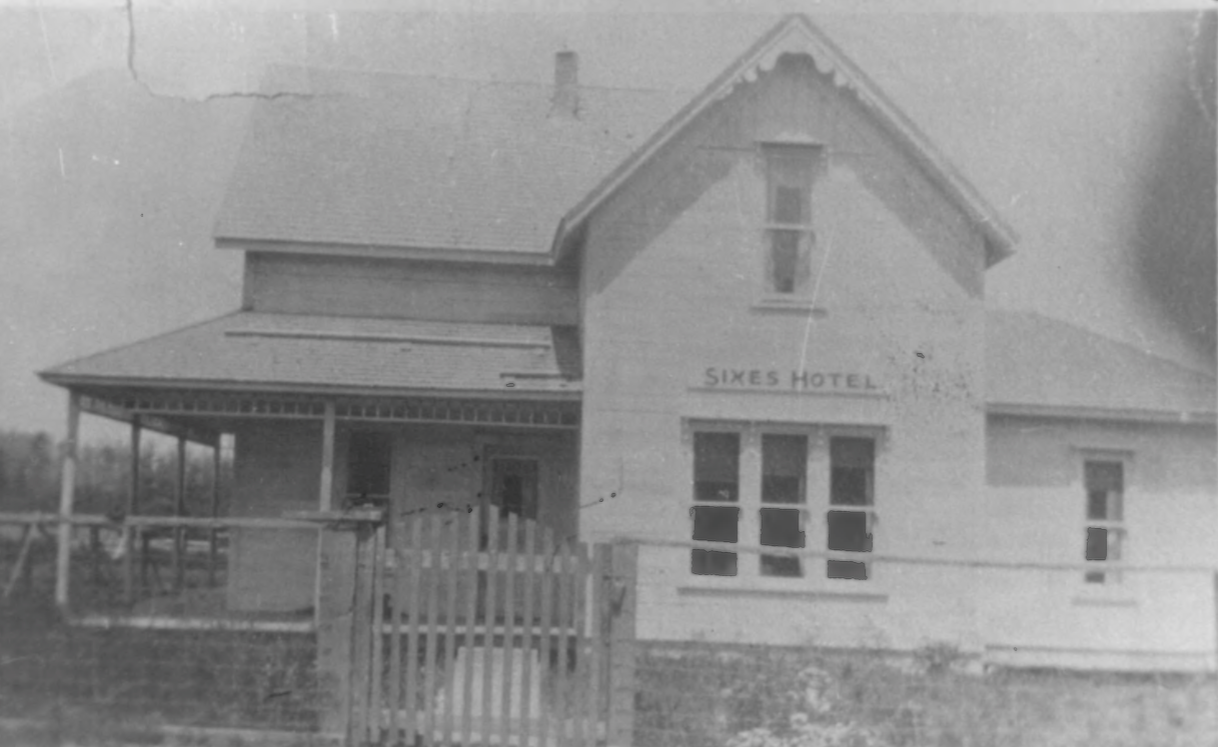
- Hotel c. 1920

- Location within Oregon Location within the United States
- Location: 93316 Sixes River Rd. Sixes, Oregon
- Coordinates: 42°49′3″N 124°28′45″W
- Area: 1.5 acres (0.61 ha)
- Built: 1918
- Architectural style: Late Gothic Revival; Vernacular Gothic Revival
- NRHP reference No.: 92001325
- Added to NRHP: October 22, 1992

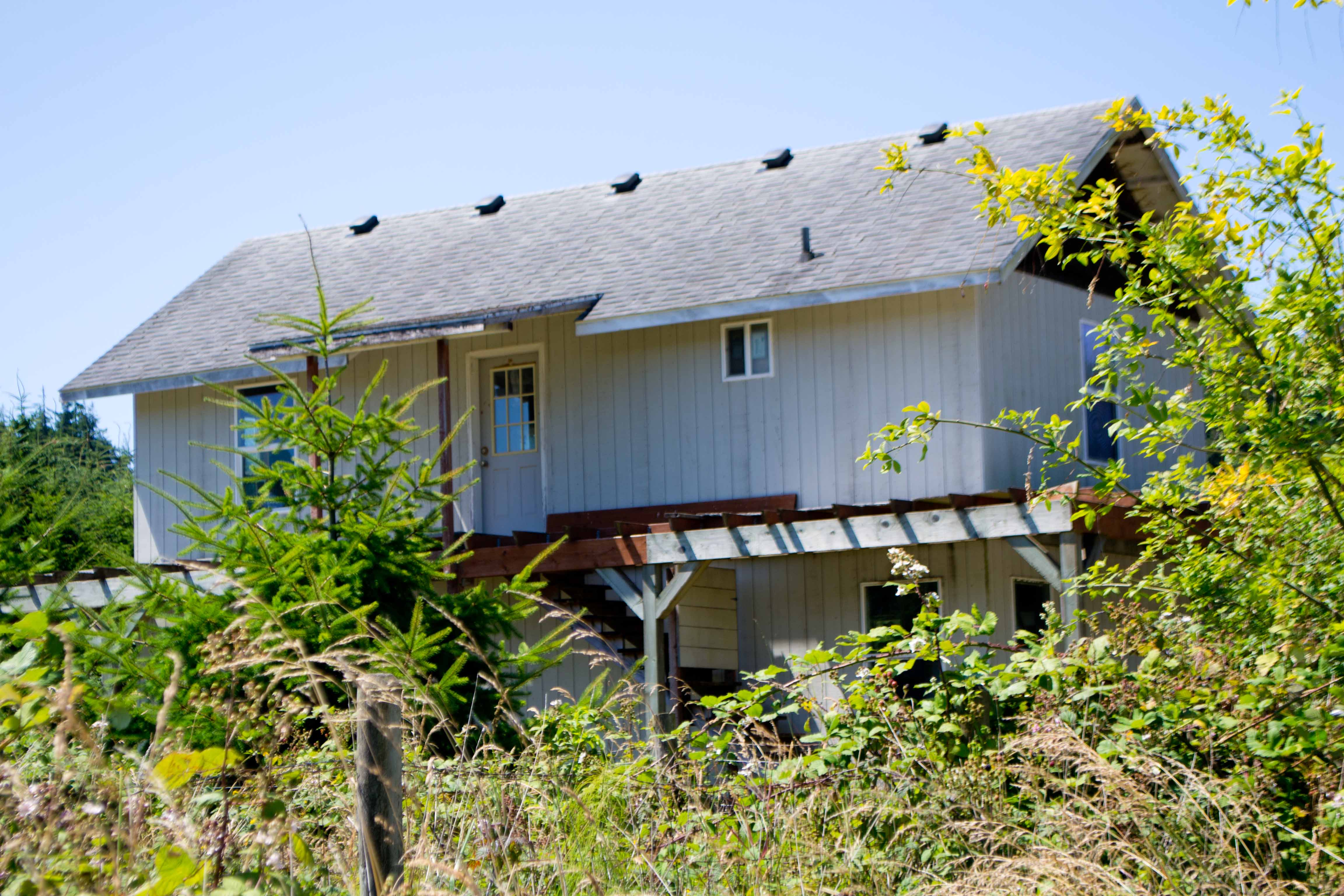
A new structure, not the historic hotel, on the property

The Sixes Hotel in Sixes, Oregon, United States, is a historic 1.5 acres (0.61 ha) property with a hotel building that is listed on the National Register of Historic Places.

== History ==
In the 1840s the location of the hotel was a stagecoach stop on the old Sixes road up the Sixes River to gold placer mines in Summerville and Inman. A saw mill was located on the property.

The building consists of two buildings that were both moved and attached together: the house of F.L. Randall, which was moved in 1920, and a former mill workers' house, moved later.
