= Indian Sands =

Indian Sands may refer to:

- Indian Sands (Carpenterville, Oregon), listed on the NRHP in Oregon
- Indian Sands (Brookings, Oregon), listed on the NRHP in Oregon
