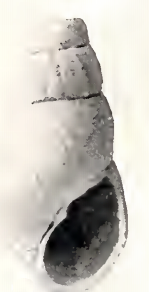
- A shell of Odostomia pleioregona

Scientific classification
- Kingdom: Animalia
- Phylum: Mollusca
- Class: Gastropoda
- Family: Pyramidellidae
- Genus: Odostomia
- Species: †O. pleioregona

Binomial name
- †Odostomia pleioregona Bartsch, 1917

Synonyms
- † Evalea pleioregona (Bartsch, 1917); † Odostomia (Evalea) pleioregona Bartsch, 1917

= Odostomia pleioregona =

Species of gastropod

Odostomia pleioregona is a species of sea snail, a marine gastropod mollusc in the family Pyramidellidae, the pyrams and their allies.

This extinct species dates from the Upper Pliocene in Oregon.

== Description ==
The white shell has a broadly conic shape. Its length measures between 3.6 mm and 4.8 mm. The whorls of the protoconch are deeply immersed in the first of the succeeding turns, above which the tilted edge of the last volution only projects. The five whorls of the teleoconch are flattened, and appressed at the summit. All of themare marked by very fine, closely spaced, spiral striations and decidedly retractively slanting, fine incremental lines. The suture is moderately impressed. The periphery of the body whorl is inflated, and obtusely angulated. The base of the shell is short, and well rounded. The large aperture is slightly effused anteriorly. The posterior angle is acute. The outer lip is thin. The inner lip is oblique, slightly revolute, and appressed to the base for its posterior half . It is provided with a strong, oblique fold at its insertion. The parietal wall is covered with a thick callus.

== Distribution ==
The type specimen was found at the mouth of Elk River, near Port Orford, Oregon.
