= Ashland National Forest =

Former national forest in Oregon

Coordinates: 42.1298°N 122.69955°W

Ashland National Forest was established as the Ashland Forest Reserve by the United States General Land Office in Oregon on September 28, 1893, with 18,560 acres (75.1 km^{2}). In 1905 federal forests were transferred to the U.S. Forest Service. Ashland became a National Forest on March 4, 1907, and on July 1, 1908, the entire forest was combined with parts of Cascade, Klamath and Siskiyou National Forests to establish Crater National Forest. The lands are presently included in Rogue River National Forest.
