= The Heads (Oregon) =

Rocky cape on the US Pacific Ocean coast

Coordinates: 42.739553°N 124.510105°W

This article about the geographical entity. For the American band, see Talking Heads post-breakup, for the UK stoner rock band, see The Heads (UK band)

The Heads is a rocky cape on the Pacific Ocean coast of southwestern Oregon in the United States. It is located in northern Curry County, just outside the town of Port Orford, along a mountainous stretch of coast bounded to the east by the Coastal Range. The cape is part of Port Orford Heads State Park.

It is approximately 5 mi (8 km) south along the coast from Cape Blanco, the westernmost point in the state of Oregon.
