= Grassy Knob Wilderness =

Wilderness area in Oregon

- IUCN category Ib (wilderness area)
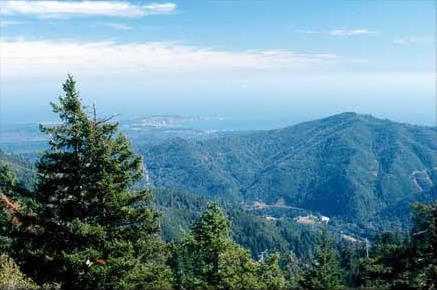
- Interactive map of Grassy Knob Wilderness
- Location: Curry County, Oregon, United States
- Nearest city: Port Orford, Oregon
- Coordinates: 42°44′27″N 124°19′36″W
- Area: 17,200 acres (6,961 ha)
- Established: 1984
- Governing body: United States Forest Service

Grassy Knob Wilderness is a wilderness area in the Klamath Mountains of southwestern Oregon, within the Rogue River-Siskiyou National Forest. It was designated wilderness by the United States Congress in 1984 and now comprises a total of 17,200 acres (6,961 ha). Like most wilderness areas in Oregon, Grassy Knob is managed by the Forest Service.

== Topography ==
Elevations in Grassy Knob Wilderness range from near sea level to 2,342 feet (714 m) at the summit of Grassy Knob. Many small streams tumble for short distances over waterfalls and through ravines in the Wilderness. The primary drainage is Dry Creek, a tributary of the Sixes River, and marks the northern boundary of the Wilderness, while the Elk River marks the southern border. The Elk has Wild and Scenic designation.

== Vegetation ==
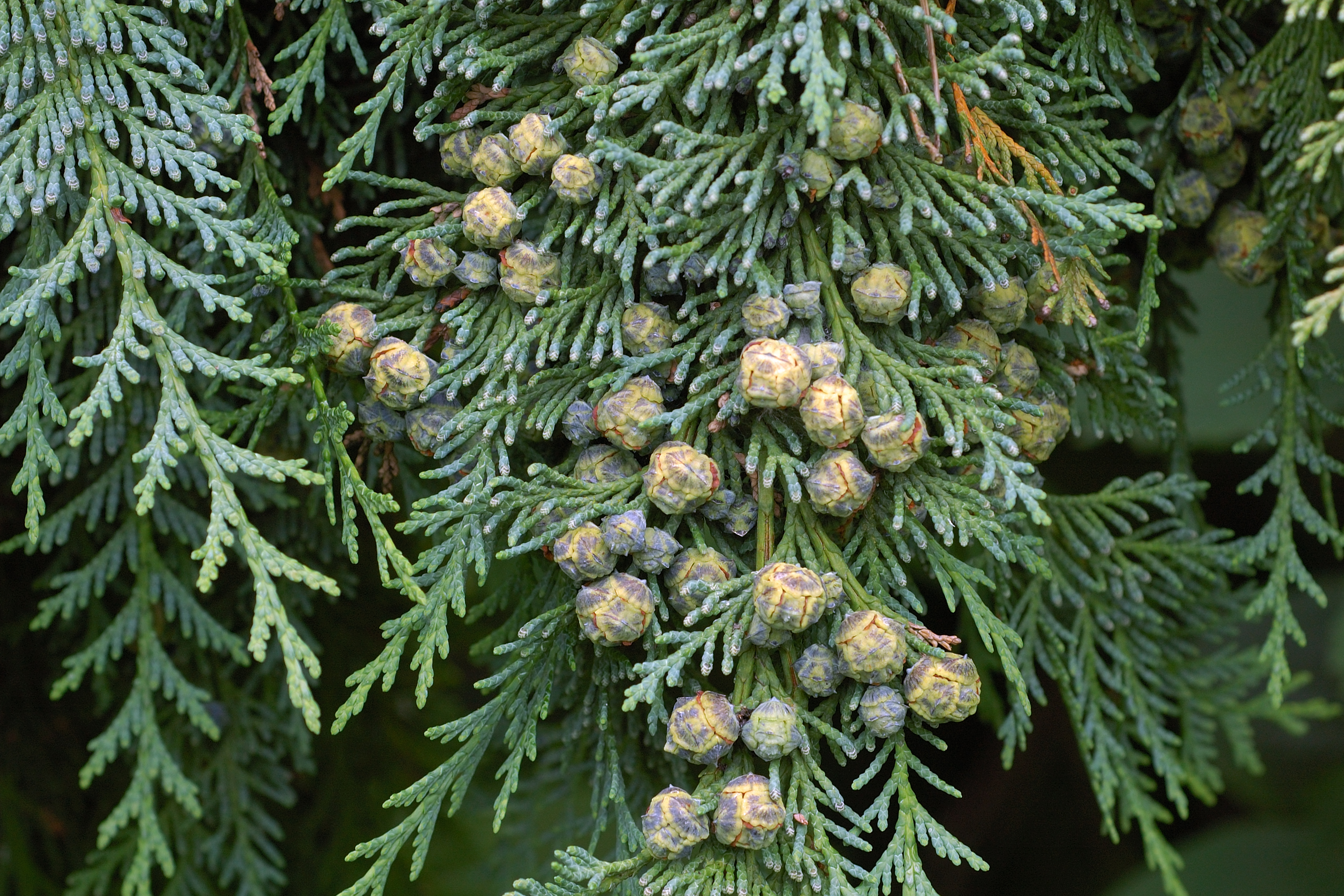
Port Orford Cedar (Chamaecyparis lawsoniana)

Grassy Knob Wilderness is home to the Port Orford cedar, including some stands of old growth with some trunks exceeding six feet in diameter. Old growth Douglas fir exists in the Wilderness as well.

== Fish ==
Both the Elk and Sixes Rivers are major steelhead and salmon streams. Some claim that the Elk River is the most productive salmon stream of its size outside of Alaska. Wild native cutthroat trout can also be found here.

== Recreation ==
Popular recreational activities in the Grassy Knob Wilderness include fishing, wildlife watching and hiking, though there are very few established trails. The Wilderness also offers extraordinary opportunities for solitude.

== See also ==
- List of Oregon Wildernesses
- List of U.S. Wilderness Areas
- Wilderness Act
- List of old growth forests
