= Rogue River–Siskiyou National Forest =

United States forest in Oregon and California

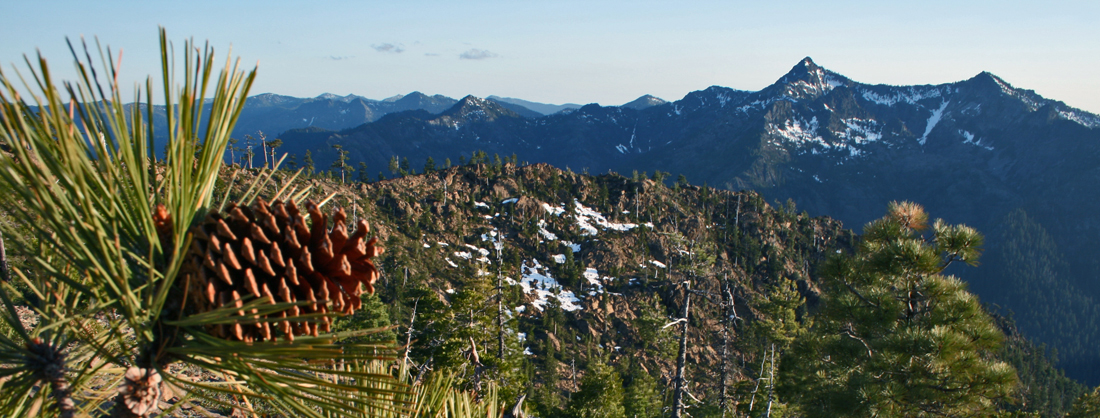
- Jeffrey pine on a high ridge

- Location within the United States
- Interactive map of Rogue River–Siskiyou National Forest
- Location: Oregon and California, United States; Coos, Curry, Douglas, Jackson, Josephine, and Klamath counties in Oregon; Del Norte and Siskiyou counties in California
- Nearest city: Medford, Oregon
- Coordinates: 42°03′45″N 123°56′15″W
- Area: 1,723,179 acres (697,346 ha; 6,973.46 km^{2}; 2,692.467 mi^{2})
- Established: 2004 (1906)
- Visitors: 915,000 (in 2006)
- Governing body: U.S. Forest Service
- Website: Rogue River–Siskiyou National Forest

The Rogue River–Siskiyou National Forest is a United States national forest in the U.S. states of Oregon and California. The formerly separate Rogue River and Siskiyou National Forests were administratively combined in 2004. Now, the Rogue River–Siskiyou National Forest ranges from the crest of the Cascade Range west into the Siskiyou Mountains, covering almost 7,300 km^{2} (2,800 sq mi). Forest headquarters are located in Medford, Oregon.

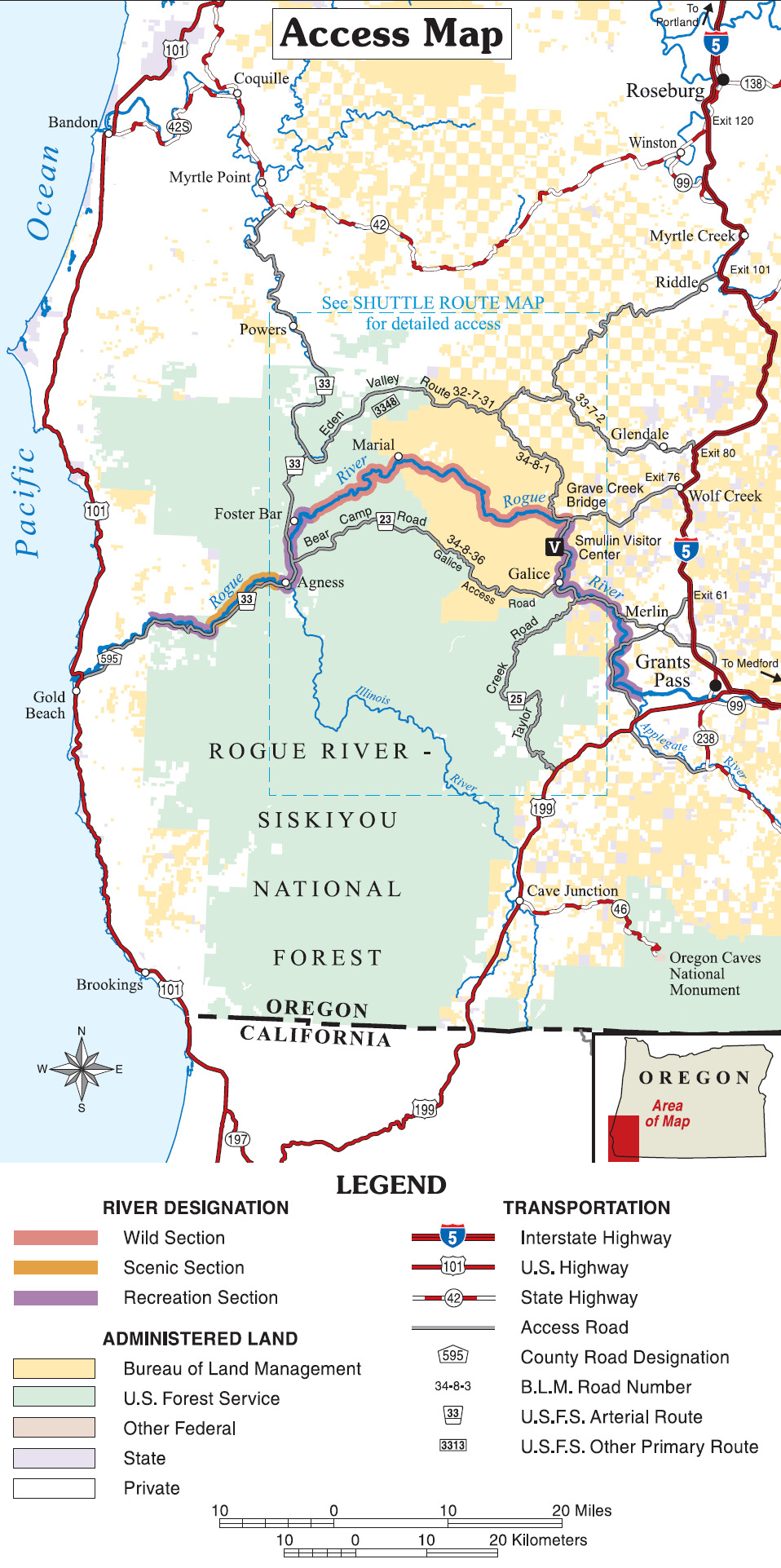
Map of southwestern Oregon

== Geography ==
The former Rogue River portion of the Rogue River–Siskiyou National Forest is located in parts of five counties in southern Oregon and northern California. In descending order of land area they are Jackson, Klamath, Douglas, Siskiyou, and Josephine counties, with Siskiyou County being the only one in California. It has a land area of 982 mi^{2} (2,540 km^{2}). There are local ranger district offices located in Ashland, Butte Falls, Grants Pass, Jacksonville, and Prospect.

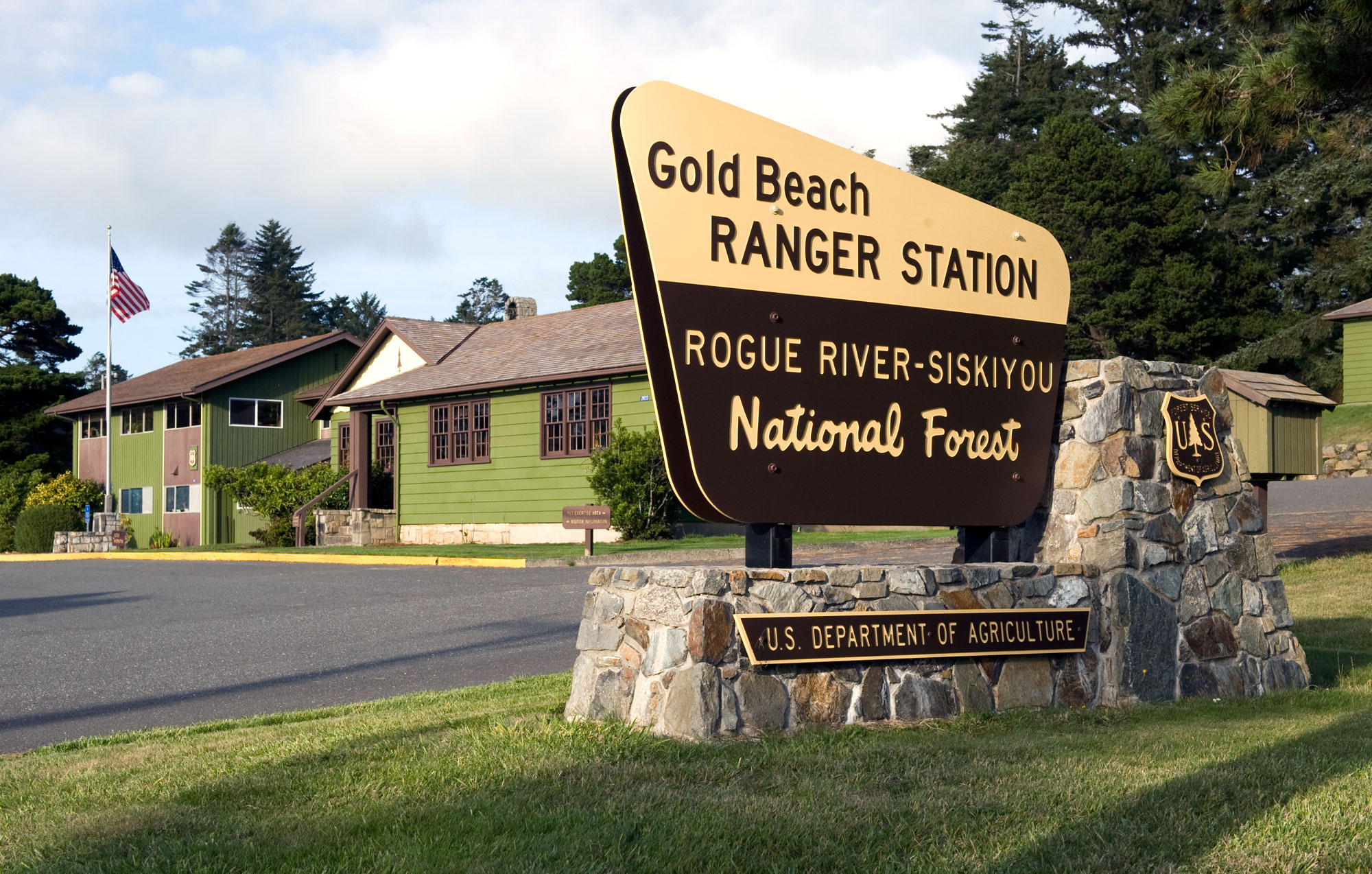
Gold Beach ranger station

The former Siskiyou portion of the Rogue River–Siskiyou National Forest is located in parts of four counties in southwestern Oregon and northwestern California. In descending order of land area they are Curry, Josephine, and Coos counties in Oregon and Del Norte County in California. It has a land area of 4,430 km^{2} (1,710 sq mi). There are local ranger district offices located in Cave Junction, Gold Beach, and Powers.

Nearly all of the national forest is mountainous and includes parts of the Southern Oregon Coast Range, the Klamath Mountains, and the Cascade Range.

The largest river in the national forest is the Rogue River, which originates in the Cascade Range and flows through the Klamath Mountains and Coast Range. The Illinois River is a major tributary of the Rogue in the Klamath Mountains, while the Sixes, Elk, Pistol, Chetco, and Winchuck rivers drain the Coast Range directly to the Pacific Ocean.

=== Climate ===
Climate data for Siskiyou National Forest (Southern Oregon and Northern California)
Month	Jan	Feb	Mar	Apr	May	Jun	Jul	Aug	Sep	Oct	Nov	Dec	Year
Record high °F (°C)	65 (18)	80 (27)	87 (31)	96 (36)	108 (42)	111 (44)	115 (46)	115 (46)	110 (43)	100 (38)	82 (28)	69 (21)	115 (46)
Mean daily maximum °F (°C)	50 (10)	55 (13)	61 (16)	68 (20)	76 (24)	84 (29)	92 (33)	92 (33)	86 (30)	74 (23)	57 (14)	49 (9)	70 (21)
Mean daily minimum °F (°C)	31 (−1)	33 (1)	35 (2)	37 (3)	41 (5)	47 (8)	51 (11)	51 (11)	46 (8)	39 (4)	36 (2)	31 (−1)	40 (4)
Record low °F (°C)	6 (−14)	6 (−14)	21 (−6)	22 (−6)	22 (−6)	27 (−3)	28 (−2)	30 (−1)	24 (−4)	18 (−8)	10 (−12)	−2 (−19)	−2 (−19)
Average precipitation inches (mm)	9.16 (233)	8.56 (217)	6.90 (175)	3.04 (77)	1.55 (39)	0.66 (17)	0.31 (7.9)	0.54 (14)	1.24 (31)	3.11 (79)	7.86 (200)	8.79 (223)	51.72 (1,312.9)
Average snowfall inches (cm)	3.40 (8.6)	1.70 (4.3)	0.60 (1.5)	0.30 (0.76)	0 (0)	0 (0)	0 (0)	0 (0)	0 (0)	0 (0)	0.90 (2.3)	3.60 (9.1)	10.50 (26.7)

== History ==
The Siskiyou National Forest was established on October 5, 1906. On July 1, 1908, it absorbed Coquille National Forest and other lands. Rogue River National Forest traces its establishment back to the creation of the Ashland Forest Reserve on September 28, 1893, by the United States General Land Office. The lands were transferred to the Forest Service in 1906, and it became a National Forest on March 4, 1907. On July 1, 1908, Ashland was combined with other lands from Cascade, Klamath and Siskiyou National Forests to establish Crater National Forest. On July 18, 1915, part of Paulina National Forest was added, and on July 9, 1932, the name was changed to Rogue River.

=== World War II bombing ===
On September 9, 1942, an airplane dropped bombs on Mount Emily in the Siskiyou National Forest, turned around, and flew back over the Pacific Ocean. The bombs exploded and started a fire, which was put out by several forest service employees. Bomb fragments were said to have Japanese markings. Stewart Holbrook vividly described this event in his essay "First Bomb". It was later confirmed that the plane was indeed Japanese, and the incident became known as the Lookout Air Raids. It was the second bombing of the continental United States by an enemy aircraft, three months after the air attack by Japan on Dutch Harbor three months earlier on June 3–4.

== Natural features ==
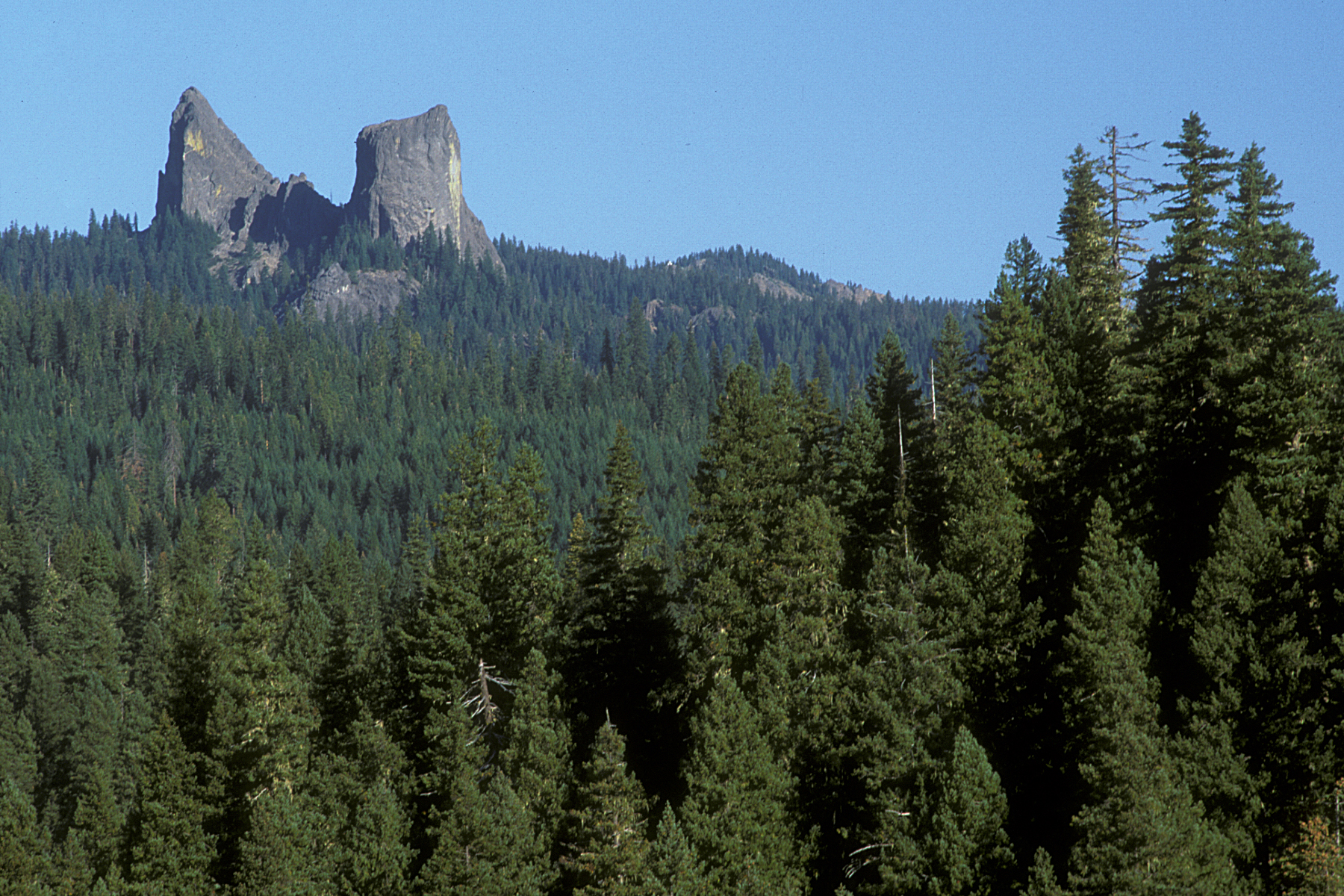
The Rabbit Ears in the Rogue River–Siskiyou National Forest

The national forest is home to some stands of old growth, including Port Orford cedar and Douglas fir in the Copper Salmon area. A 1993 Forest Service study estimated that the extent of old growth in the forest was 1,397 km^{2} (539 sq mi) some of which occurs in the Red Buttes Wilderness. Blue oak, Quercus douglasii, and Canyon live oak, Quercus chrysolepis occur in the Siskiyou National Forest. For the California endemic Blue Oak, the disjunctive stands are occurring near the northern limit of its range, which occur no farther north than Del Norte County. The world's tallest pine tree is a 268.35-foot (81.79 m) ponderosa and is located in the national forest.

In 2002, the massive Biscuit Fire burned nearly 500,000 acres (2,000 km^{2}; 780 mi^{2}), including much of the Kalmiopsis Wilderness.

== Protected areas ==
The Rogue River–Siskiyou National Forest contains all or part of eight separate wilderness areas, which together add up to 565,900 acres (2,290 km^{2}; 884.2 mi^{2}):

- Copper Salmon Wilderness - 13,700 acres (55.4 km^{2}; 21.4 mi^{2})
- Grassy Knob Wilderness - 17,200 acres (69.6 km^{2}; 26.9 mi^{2})
- Kalmiopsis Wilderness - 179,775 acres (727.5 km^{2}; 280.9 mi^{2})
- Red Buttes Wilderness - 19,940 acres (80.7 km^{2}; 31.2 mi^{2})
- Rogue–Umpqua Divide Wilderness - 33,200 acres (134.4 km^{2}; 51.9 mi^{2})
- Siskiyou Wilderness - 152,680 acres (617.9 km^{2}; 238.6 mi^{2})
- Sky Lakes Wilderness - 113,590 acres (459.7 km^{2}; 177.5 mi^{2})
- Wild Rogue Wilderness - 35,818 acres (145.0 km^{2}; 56.0 mi^{2})

== See also ==
- High Cascades Complex fires
- List of national forests of the United States
- List of old-growth forests
