= Coquille National Forest =

Forest in Oregon, USA

Coordinates: 42.718°N 124.021°W

Coquille National Forest was established in Oregon by the U.S. Forest Service on March 2, 1907 with 148,317 acres (600.22 km^{2}). On July 1, 1908 it was combined with Siskiyou National Forest and the name was discontinued.
