= Copper Salmon Wilderness =

Protected area in Oregon, United States

- IUCN category Ib (wilderness area)
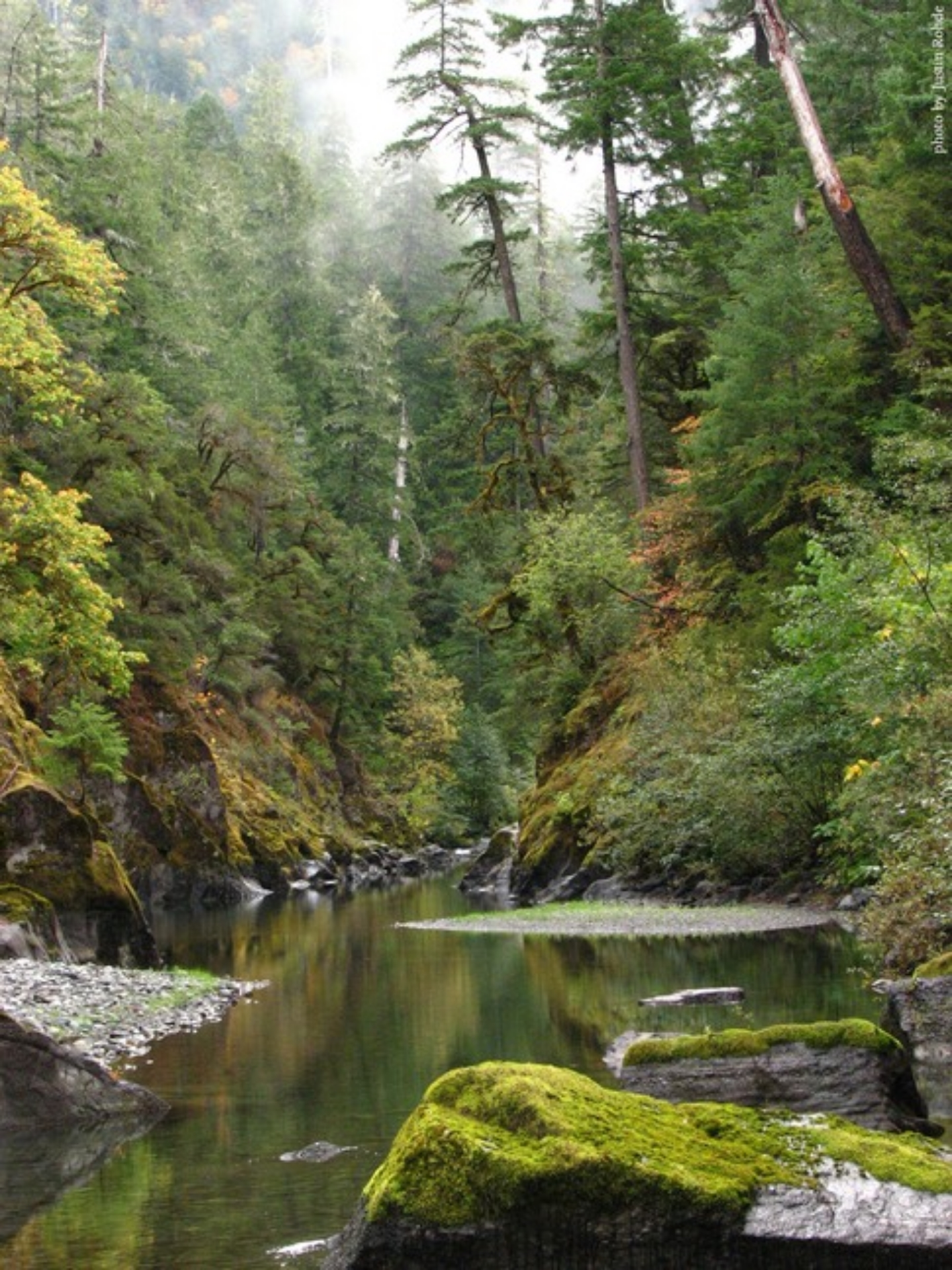
- A canyon in the wilderness area

- Location within the United States
- Location: Curry / Coos counties, Oregon, USA
- Nearest city: Port Orford, Oregon
- Coordinates: 42°43.5′N 124°10.5′W
- Area: 13,700 acres (5,544 ha)
- Established: 2009
- Governing body: U.S. Forest Service

The Copper Salmon Wilderness is a protected wilderness area in the Southern Oregon Coast Range and is part of the Rogue River–Siskiyou National Forest. The wilderness area was created by the Omnibus Public Land Management Act of 2009, which was signed into law by President Barack Obama on March 30, 2009.

The Copper Salmon Wilderness is located along the North and South Forks of Elk River and the upper Middle Fork of Sixes River.

The area contains one of the nation's largest remaining stands of low-elevation old-growth forest and one of the healthiest salmon, steelhead, and cutthroat trout runs in the continental United States along the north Fork of the Elk River, as well as stands of vulnerable Port Orford cedar and endangered marbled murrelets and northern spotted owls.

== See also ==
- List of Oregon Wildernesses
- List of U.S. Wilderness Areas
- List of old growth forests
- Wilderness Act
