= Crater National Forest =

Former national forest in Oregon

Coordinates: 42.962°N 122.148°W

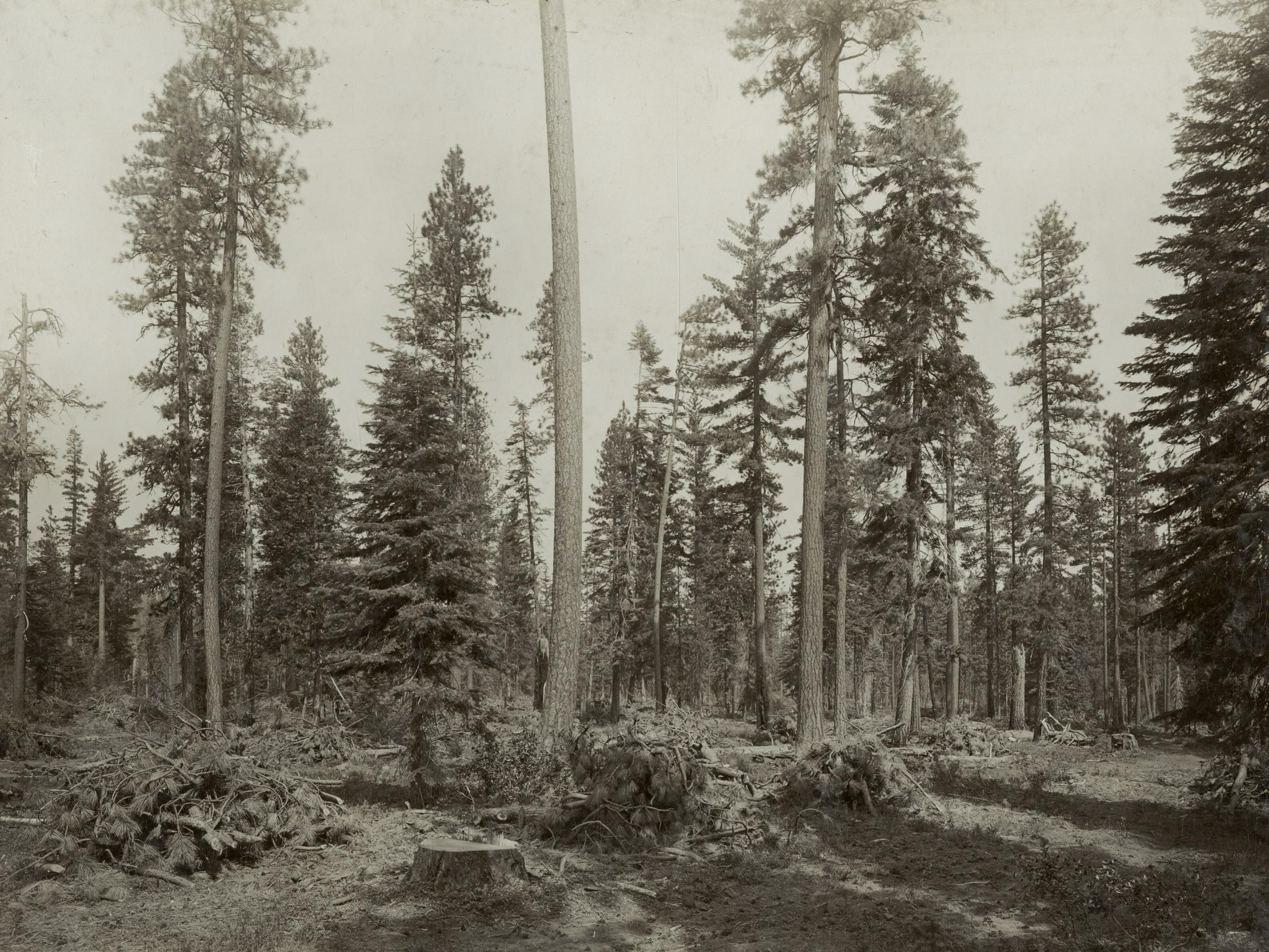
C. S. and R. S. Moore timber sale area on the Crater National Forest in 1911 showing good brush piling, low stumps, and the trees left in the selection cutting

Crater National Forest was established by the U.S. Forest Service in Oregon on July 1, 1908 with 1,119,834 acres (4,531.81 km^{2}) from portions of Cascade, Klamath and, Siskiyou National Forests as well as all of Ashland National Forest. On July 18, 1915 part of Paulina National Forest was added, and on July 9, 1932 the forest's name was changed to Rogue River National Forest.
