= Martín de Aguilar =

Martín de Aguilar (fl. 1603) was a Spanish explorer whose log contains one of the first written descriptions of the coast of the U.S. state of Oregon.

Aguilar was the commander of the ship Tres Reyes in an expedition led by Sebastián Vizcaíno. Vizcaíno set out from Mexico in 1602 in search of usable harbors and the mythical city of Quivira. While exploring along the northern California coast, a storm separated Vizcaíno and Aguilar's ships. While Vizcaíno may have reached the present Oregon-California border, Aguilar continued up the coast. Aguilar is thought to have sighted and named Cape Blanco, and he may have sailed as far as Coos Bay.

Aguilar reported sighting a "rapid and abundant" river that he did not enter because of the current. He then turned back to Mexico because of scurvy among his crew. It is unknown which river he sighted, but maps referred to the "Rio d'Aguilar" in the 18th century. No deliberate exploration of the Northwest Coast occurred again until some 150 years after Aguilar, though accidental sightings and shipwrecks were possible.

Aguilar and most of his crew died on the way to Acapulco.
