= Sixes, Oregon =

Unincorporated community in the state of Oregon, United States

- Unincorporated community
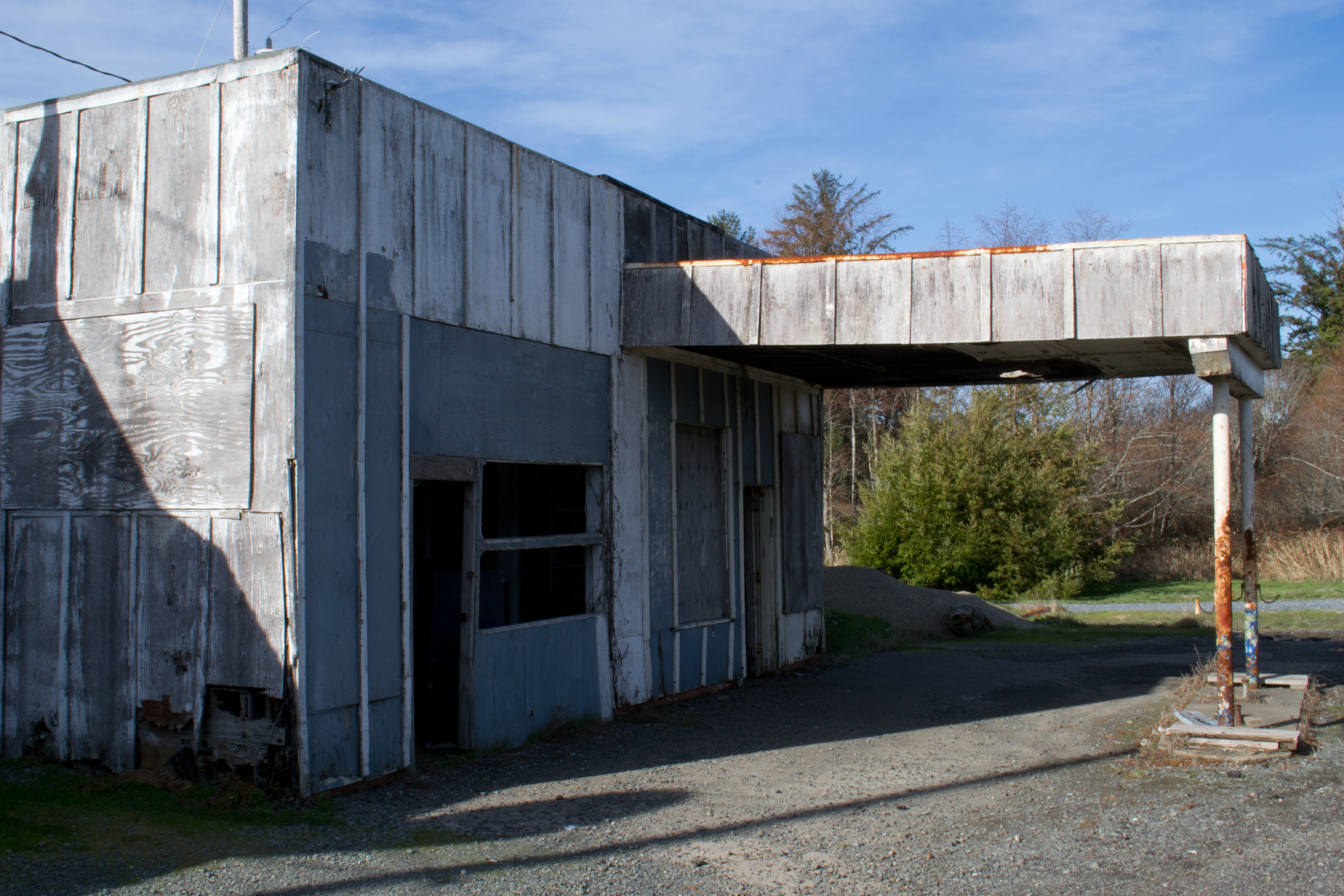
- Former gas station in Sixes

- Location within the state of Oregon Sixes (the United States)
- Coordinates: 42°49′13″N 124°28′55″W
- Country: United States
- State: Oregon
- County: Curry
- Elevation: 23 ft (7.0 m)
- Time zone: UTC-8 (Pacific (PST))
  - Summer (DST): UTC-7 (PDT)
- ZIP code: 97476
- Area codes: 458 and 541
- GNIS feature ID: 1149566

Sixes is an unincorporated community in Curry County, Oregon, United States. It is along U.S. Route 101 and the Sixes River, east of Cape Blanco and the Cape Blanco Lighthouse.

Accounts vary as to the origin of the name "Sixes". The community was named after the river. One local postmaster said Sixes was named for a Native American chief. Another source said that in 1851, the river was usually called the "Sikhs River" after the Chinook Jargon word for "friend", and on maps it was called the "Sequalchin River". Another source says the Native American name for the river was "Sa-qua-mi". Hodge's Handbook of American Indians says that one of the variants of the name of the local tribe, the Kwatami (a subdivision of the Tututni), was "Sik-ses-tene", which is said to mean "people by the far north country". Though this is most likely the real source of the name, the spelling "Sixes" was probably used by miners drawn to the Oregon gold rush who were familiar with the Chinook word "sikhs". The current spelling was used as early as 1855, and Sixes' post office was established in 1888. The Sixes post office has since closed.

== See also ==
- List of places with numeric names
