= Indian Sands (Brookings, Oregon) =

- U.S. National Register of Historic Places
- Location: Address restricted
- Nearest city: Brookings, Oregon
- NRHP reference No.: 92000668
- Added to NRHP: June 4, 1992

Indian Sands near Brookings, Oregon is an archaeological site that was listed on the National Register of Historic Places in 1992.

== Archaeological finds ==
In 2002, a team of researchers from Oregon State University found evidence of human presence on the southern Oregon coast at the Indian Sands area of Boardman State Park dating more than 10,000 years ago — more than 2,000 years older than previously known archaeological sites on Oregon's coast. Carbon dating of artifacts (similar to ones found on the Alaskan and British Columbia coasts) suggested an origin approximately 12,000 years ago.

== See also ==
- Carpenterville, Oregon—a community near Brookings, Oregon
