= Samuel H. Boardman State Scenic Corridor =

State park in Oregon, USA

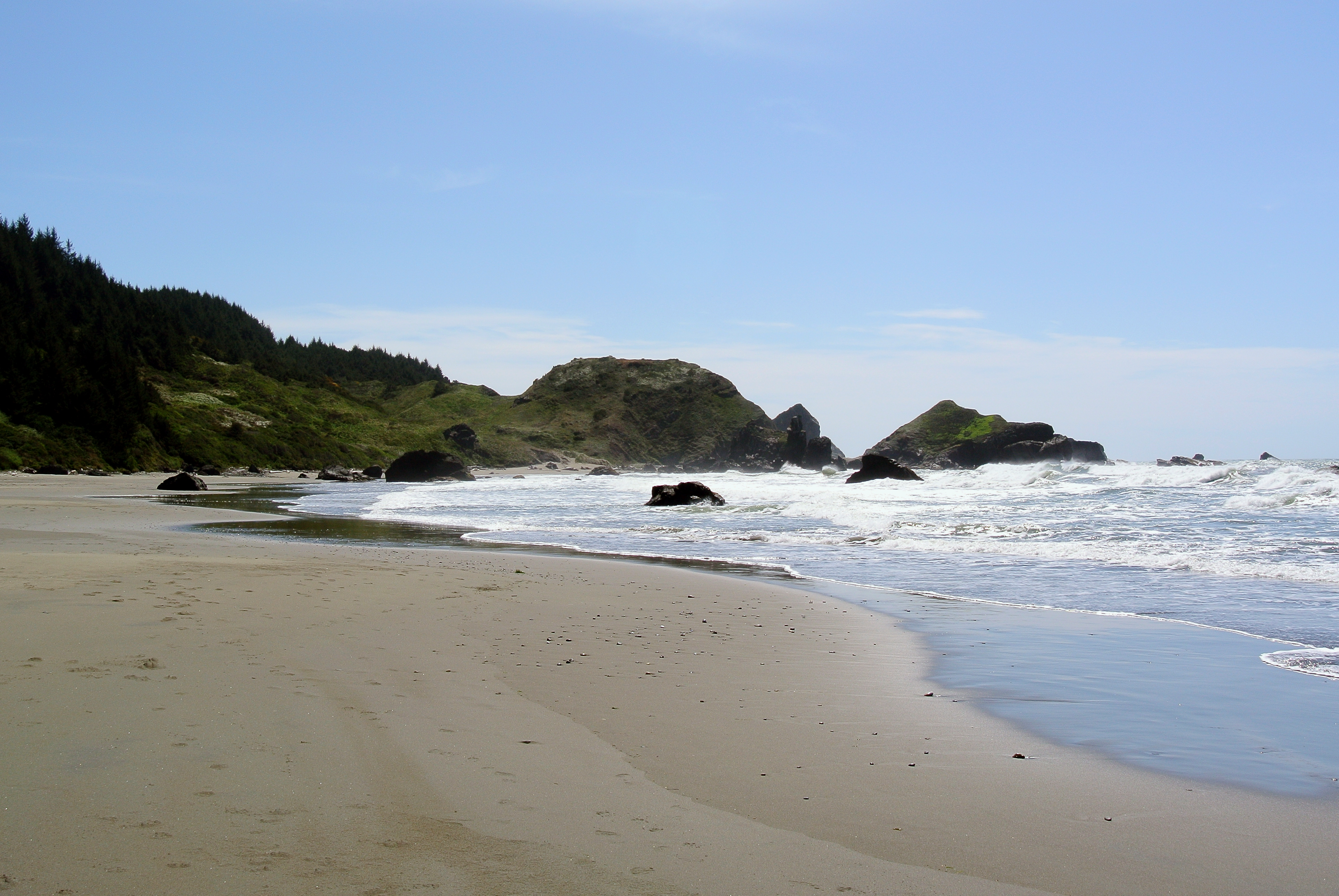
- Lone Ranch Beach seen towards south

- Location within Oregon Location within the United States
- Type: Public, state
- Location: Curry County, Oregon, United States
- Nearest city: Brookings
- Coordinates: 42°07′12″N 124°21′13″W
- Created: 1949
- Operator: Oregon Parks and Recreation Department

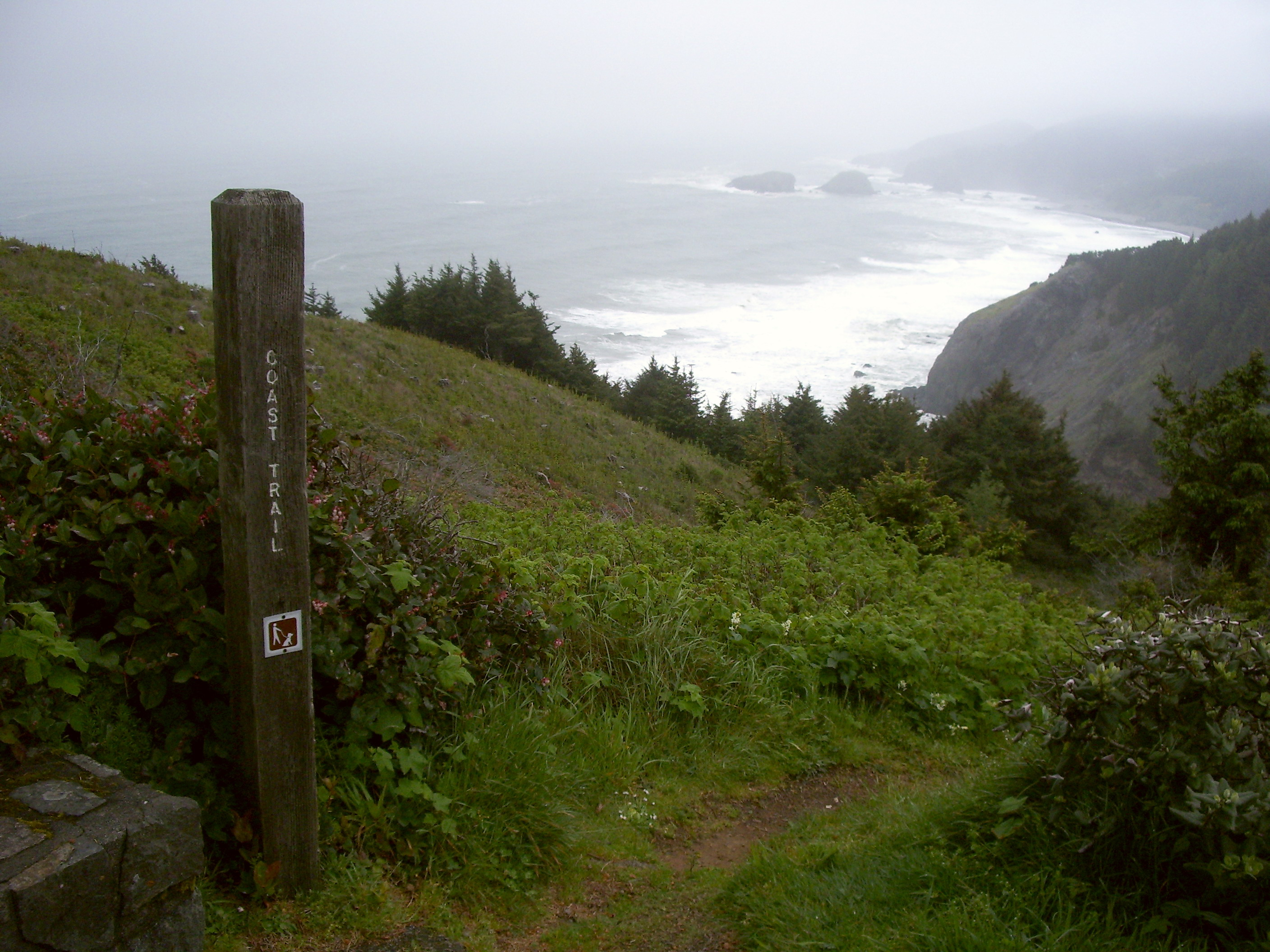
Oregon Coast Trail north of House Rock Creek

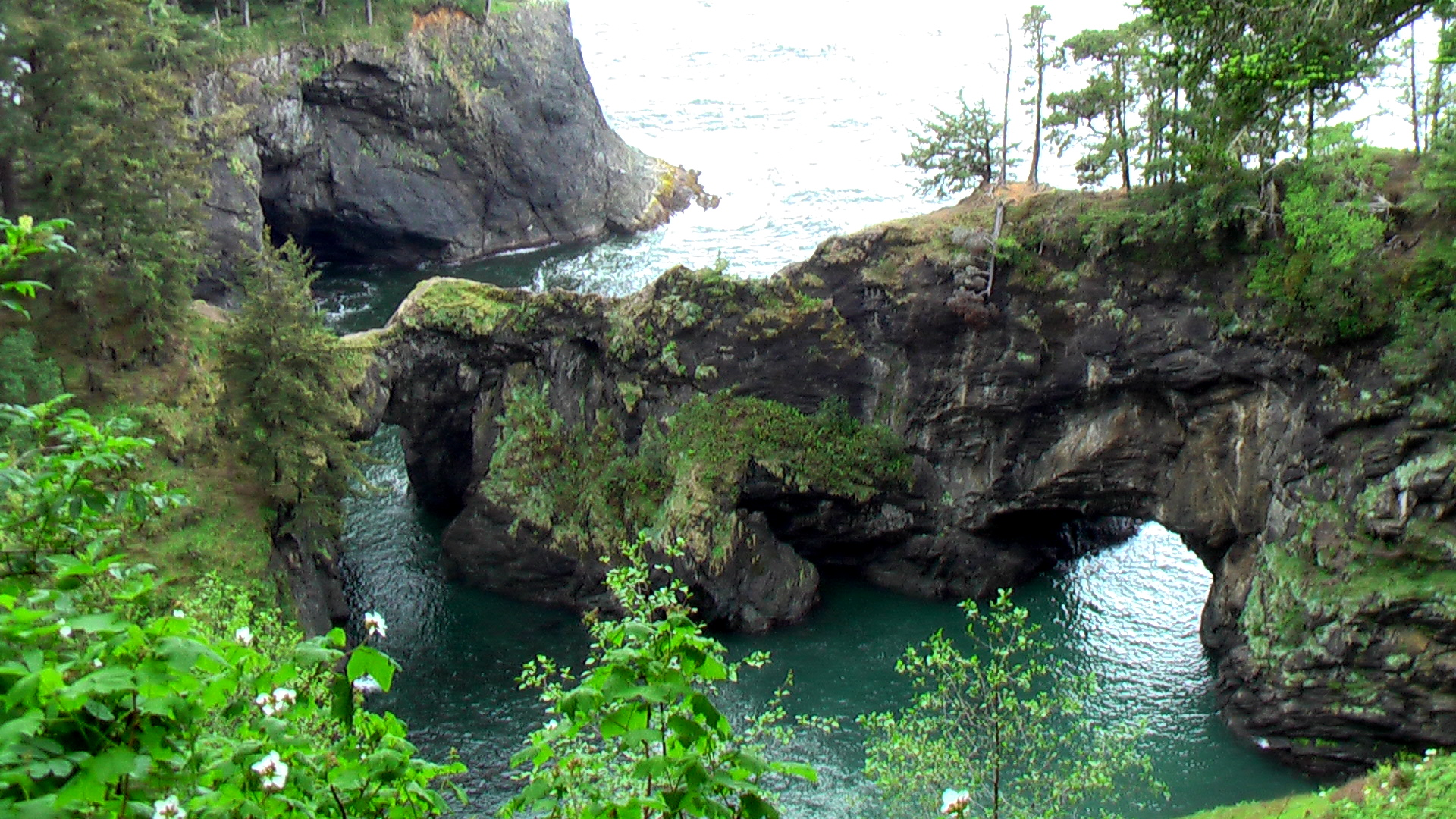
Natural coves

Samuel H. Boardman State Scenic Corridor is a linear state park in southwestern Oregon, in the United States. It is 12 miles (19 km) long and thickly forested along steep and rugged coastline with a few small sand beaches. It is named in honor of Samuel H. Boardman, the first Oregon Parks superintendent.

It is located from 3 to 15 miles (5 to 24 km) north of Brookings, between the Pacific Ocean and U.S. Route 101. The north end abuts the Pistol River State Scenic Viewpoint. More than 14 named creeks cross the corridor.

The Oregon Coast Trail meanders for about 27 miles (43 km) through the park, among 300-year-old Sitka spruce trees and several natural arches and bridges. There is beach access and some sand dunes. The Oregon Islands National Wildlife Refuge and Oregon Islands Wilderness protect wildlife and habitat on all of the approximately 130 rocks and islands along the corridor's shore.

== History ==
The area was used by Native Americans. Later, it was used by several (now abandoned) mining operations, whose ruins are still visible. At the Indian Sands site within the park, archaeological finds have provided evidence of human activity in this area 10,000 to 12,000 years ago, which is likely the result of migration along the Pacific coast from the area of the Bering Land Bridge.

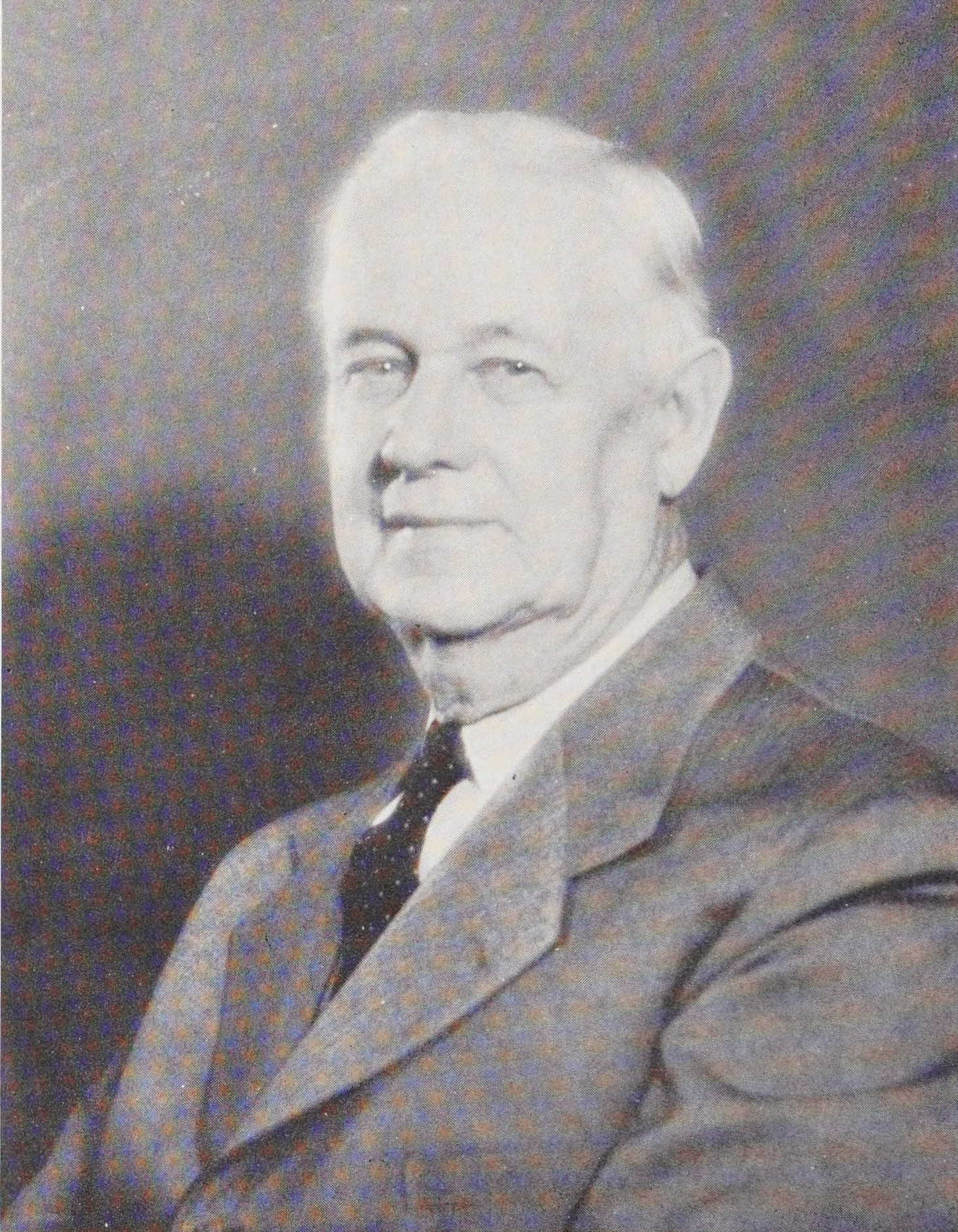
Samuel H. Boardman

A national park on the southern Oregon Coast was proposed in the late 1930s; it was to encompass 30,000 acres (12,000 ha) from Gold Beach to Brookings. A Congressional bill to formally create the national park was introduced in 1940, but it was never realized. The first acquisition for a state park along the coast was 121 acres (49 ha) purchased in May 1949. There were at least 12 additional purchases made by May 1957. The Oregon Parks Commission received its first alien gift of 367.0 acres (149 ha) made in 1950 by Borax Consolidated, Ltd of London, which retains the right to mine underground minerals such as borax. The company acquired the land c. 1880 for mining purposes. The park was named in 1950 for Oregon parks superintendent Samuel H. Boardman.

There have never been overnight facilities.

== See also ==
- List of Oregon State Parks
