= Cape Blanco Light =

Lighthouse in Oregon, United States

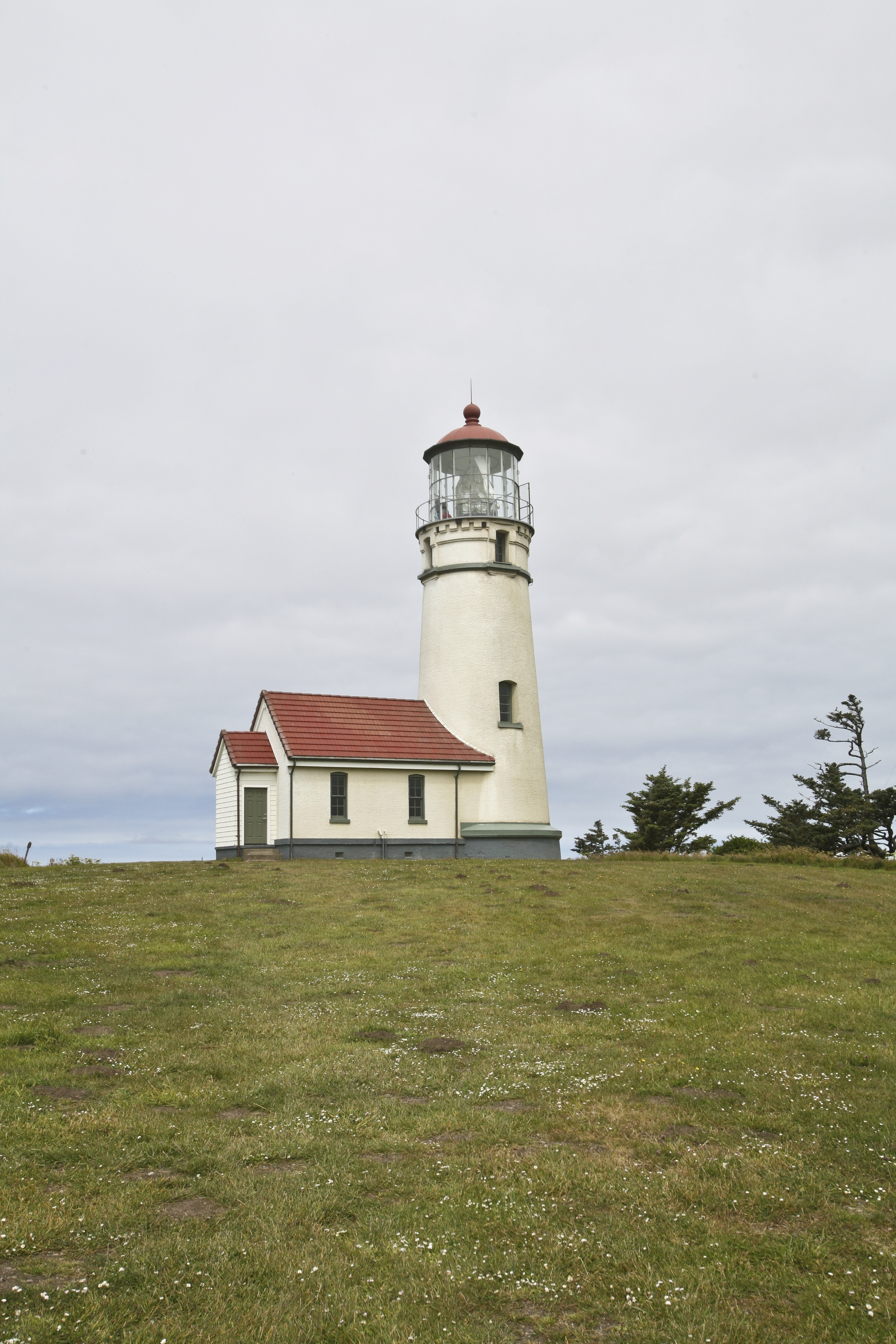
- Cape Blanco Light
- Location: Oregon
- Coordinates: 42°50′12″N 124°33′48″W

Tower
- Constructed: 1870
- Foundation: Brick
- Construction: Brick
- Automated: 1980
- Height: 59 feet (18 m)
- Shape: Conical attached to workroom
- Markings: White tower, green lantern, red dome
- Heritage: National Register of Historic Places listed place

Light
- First lit: December 20, 1870
- Focal height: 256 feet (78 m)
- Lens: First order Fresnel (moved to Tongue Point in Astoria), Second order Fresnel (1936)
- Range: 23 nautical miles (43 km; 26 mi)
- Characteristic: Flash White 20 Seconds
- Cape Blanco Lighthouse
- U.S. National Register of Historic Places
- Nearest city: Sixes, Oregon
- Area: 1.1 acres (0.45 ha)
- Built by: US Army Corps of Engineers; Williamson, Lt. R.A.
- MPS: Lighthouse Stations of Oregon MPS
- NRHP reference No.: 73002339
- Added to NRHP: April 21, 1993

Cape Blanco Light is a lighthouse located on Cape Blanco, Oregon, United States, in Cape Blanco State Park.

== Construction of the light ==
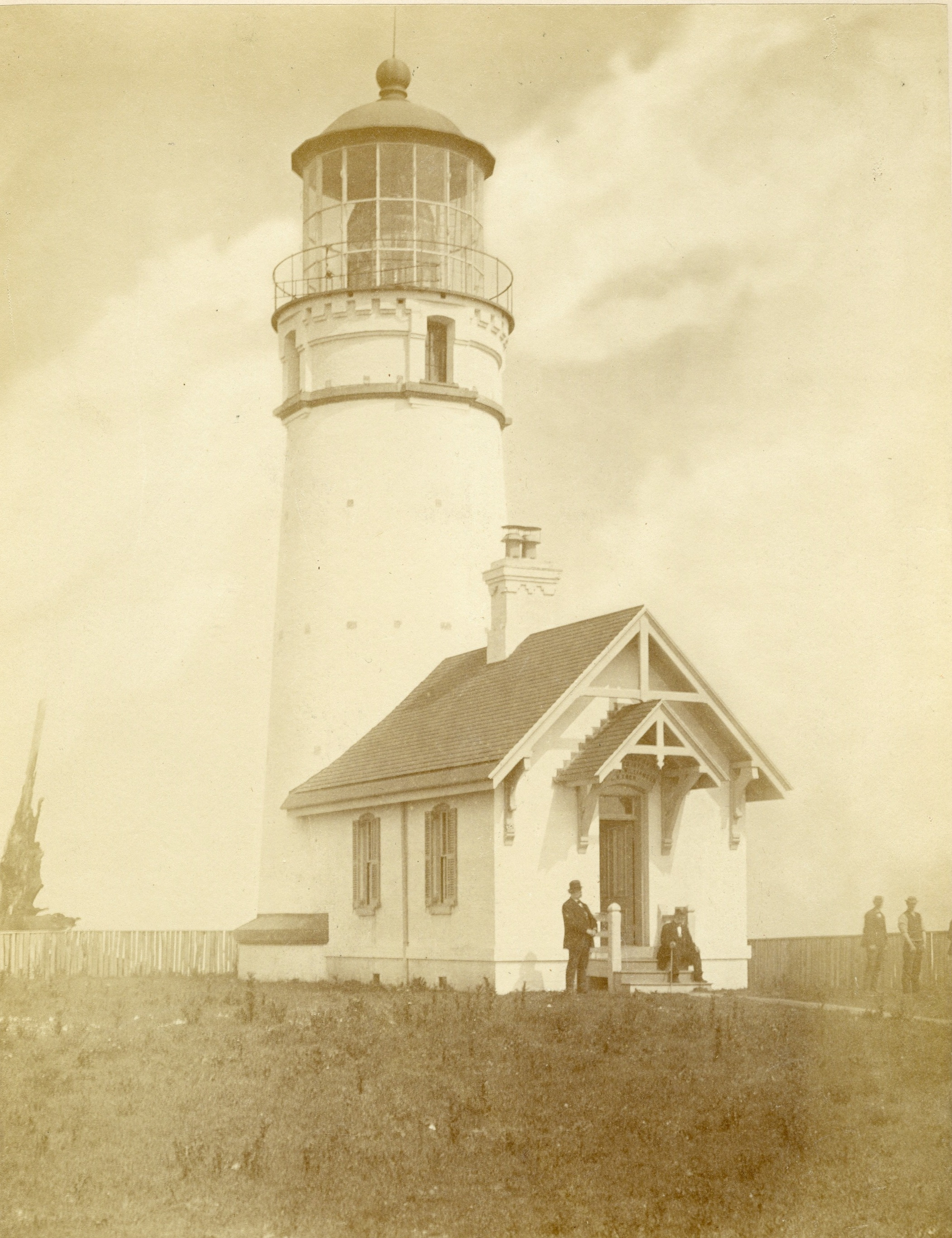
The lighthouse in 1871

In a deed recorded in 1867, John D. and Mary West sold the United States a 47.3-acre (19.1 ha) tract of land. The Light-House board determined that the offshore reef and islands at Cape Blanco were dangerous to maritime commerce; therefore, a lighthouse was authorized for construction.

Over the next three years, the lighthouse was constructed under the direction of Lt. Col. Robert Stockton Williamson. Supplies were ordered and shipped to the cape. Bricks were deemed cheaper if made onsite, so a brickmaker was located and a deal was struck with Rancher Patrick Hughes for access to the required materials.

== Keepers ==
Many keepers followed Burnap, the most notable were James Langlois and James Hughes who served as keepers for 42 and 38 years respectively. James Langlois raised a large family. James Hughes, son of neighboring rancher Patrick Hughes, raised two girls.

For many years, Keeper Langlois requested additional housing for the station. With his large family, the Hughes family, and the other families that came and went, the duplex was just too crowded. His requests went unanswered until 1909 when Head Keepers' quarters were constructed.

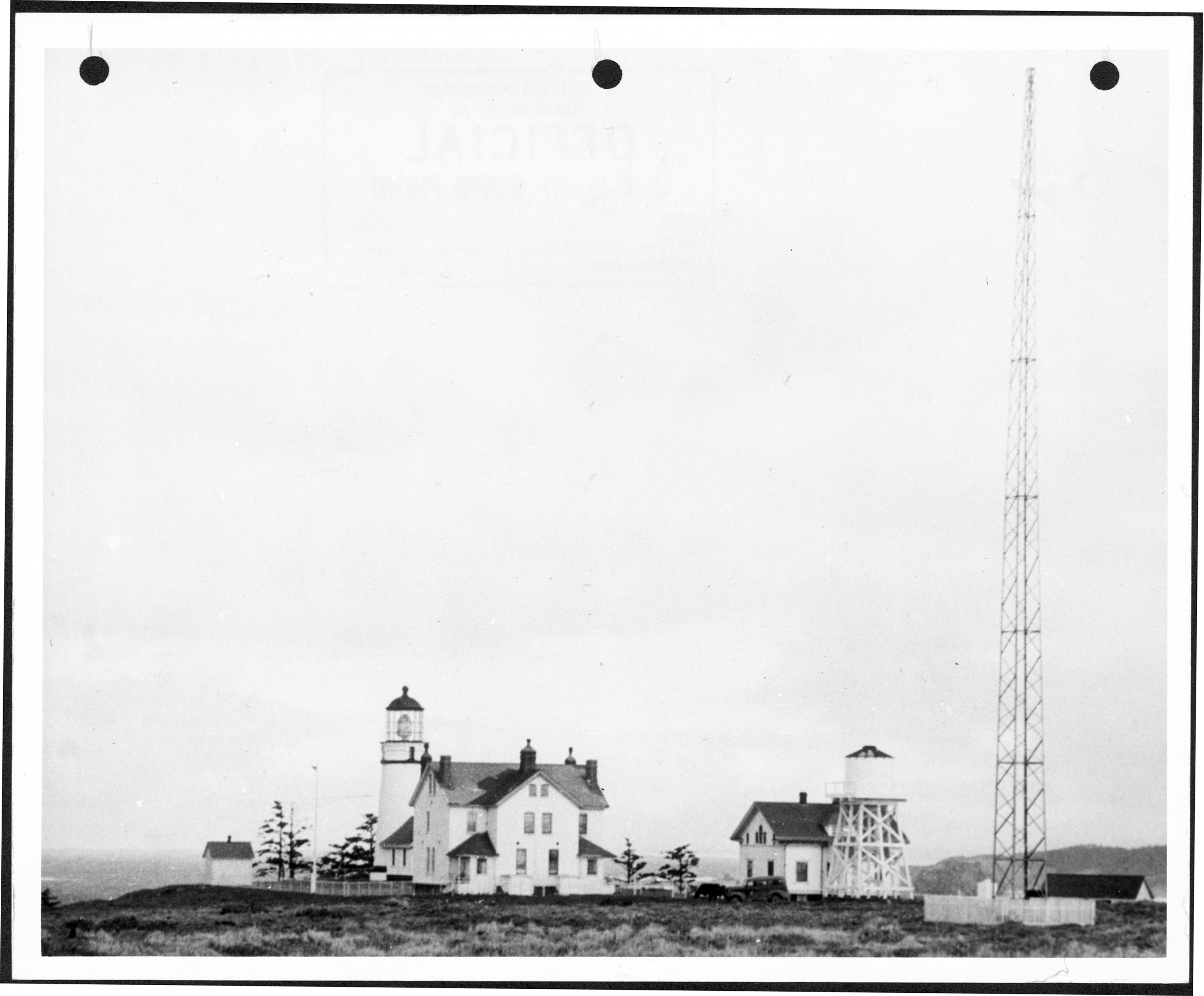
Cape Blanco Lighthouse and Dwelling, 1943

James Hughes found his own solution before the government responded. James owned land across the Sixes River from his father and quickly constructed a home for his family, moving from the lighthouse about the same time they finished additional lighthouse quarters. James continued to work at the lighthouse, commuting to assume his duties.

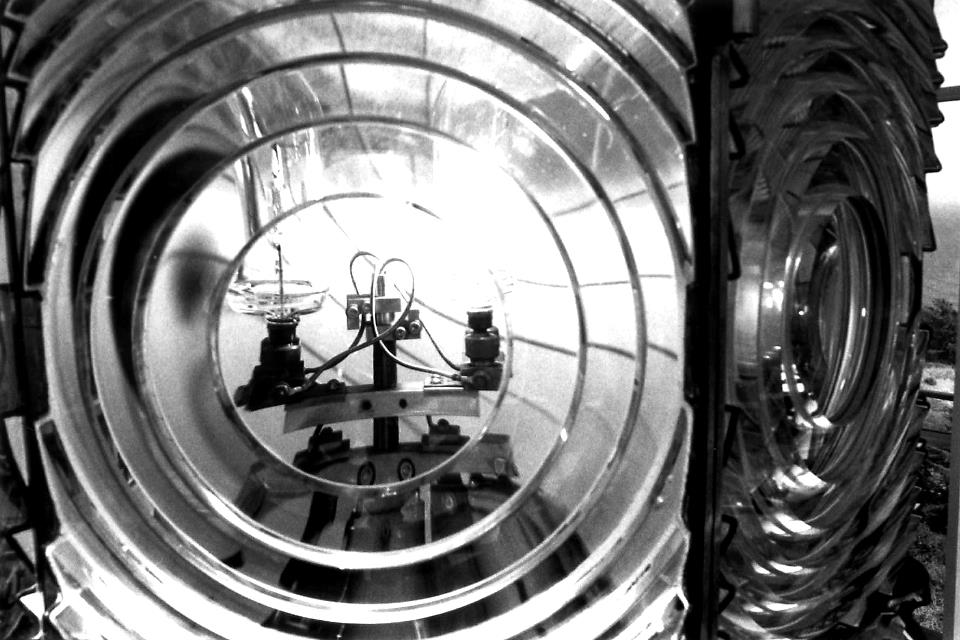
A lamp at the Cape Blanco Light, 2003

Life was difficult on the cape, which experiences constant high winds during the spring and summer and severe storms in winter. The weather kept the keepers busy with continual repairs and painting. Despite the hardship, both Langlois and Hughes stayed there until retirement.

== See also ==
- List of lighthouses on the Oregon Coast
