= Sixes River =

River in the United States

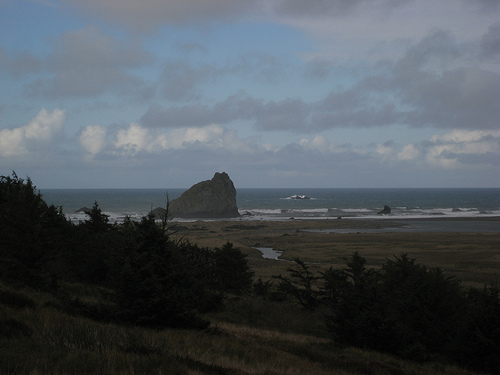
- Near the river mouth

- Location of the mouth of Sixes River in Oregon

Location
- Country: United States
- State: Oregon
- County: Curry

Physical characteristics
- Source: Klamath Mountains
  - location: near Sugarloaf Mountain, Rogue River – Siskiyou National Forest
  - coordinates: 42°51′12″N 124°09′18″W
  - elevation: 1,064 ft (324 m)
- Mouth: Pacific Ocean
  - location: Cape Blanco
  - coordinates: 42°51′13″N 124°32′38″W
  - elevation: 0 ft (0 m)
- Length: 31 mi (50 km)
- Basin size: 134 sq mi (350 km^{2})
- Discharge
  - average: 752 cu ft/s (21.3 m^{3}/s)

The Sixes River flows about 31 miles (50 km) through coastal forests in southwestern Oregon in the United States. It drains a rugged region of the Klamath Mountains along the Pacific north of Port Orford.

It rises in the mountains of northern Curry County, south of Sugarloaf Mountain in the Rogue River – Siskiyou National Forest. It flows generally west, through Grassy Knob Wilderness and the small community of Sixes, and eventually enters the Pacific just north of Cape Blanco, the westernmost point in Oregon. The mouth of the river is along the coast in Cape Blanco State Park.

== Name ==
Accounts vary as to the origin of the name "Sixes". One local postmaster said Sixes was named for a Native American chief. Another source said that in 1851, the river was usually called the "Sikhs River" after the Chinook Jargon word for "friend", and on maps it was called the "Sequalchin River". Another source says the Native American name for the river was "Sa-qua-mi". Hodge's Handbook of American Indians says that one of the variants of the name of the local tribe, the Kwatami (a subdivision of the Tututni), was "Sik-ses-tene", which is said to mean "people by the far north country". Though this is most likely the real source of the name, the spelling "Sixes" was probably used by miners drawn to the Oregon gold rush who were familiar with the Chinook word "sikhs". The current spelling was used as early as 1855.

== Copper Salmon Wilderness ==
In 2009, 13,700 acres (55.4 km^{2}) along the north and south forks of the Elk River and the upper Middle Fork Sixes River were designated as the Copper Salmon Wilderness. The area contains one of the nation's largest stands of low-elevation old-growth forest. Wildlife species include salmon, steelhead, coastal cutthroat trout, marbled murrelets, northern spotted owls, and Roosevelt elk, among others.

== Tributaries ==
Named tributaries from source to mouth are Murphy Canyon, Haines Creek, North Fork Sixes River, Sugar and Sucker creeks, followed by the Middle Fork Sixes River. Below this come Big and Otter creeks, then the South Fork Sixes River. Further downstream are Elephant Rock, Little Dry, Pipeline, Dry, Edson, Koch, Jenny, Beaver, and Crystal creeks. Last is Sullivan Gulch.

== See also ==
- List of rivers of Oregon
