= Elk River (Oregon) =

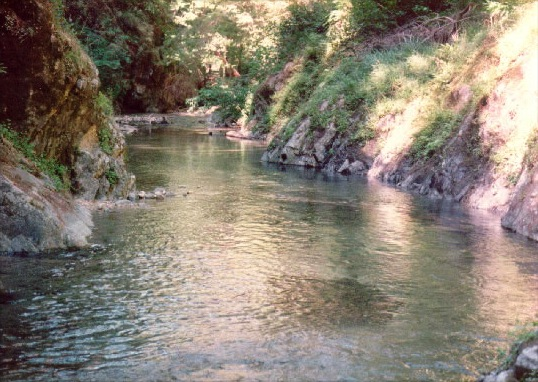
- Elk River flowing through the forest

- Location of the mouth of Elk River in Oregon

Location
- Country: United States
- State: Oregon
- County: Curry

Physical characteristics
- Source: confluence of North Fork Elk River and South Fork Elk River
  - location: Rogue River – Siskiyou National Forest
  - coordinates: 42°43′00″N 124°12′19″W
  - elevation: 913 ft (278 m)
- Mouth: Pacific Ocean
  - location: between Cape Blanco and Port Orford
  - coordinates: 42°47′35″N 124°31′32″W
  - elevation: 3 ft (0.91 m)
- Length: 29 mi (47 km)
- Basin size: 92 sq mi (240 km^{2})
- Discharge
  - average: 716 cu ft/s (20.3 m^{3}/s)

National Wild and Scenic River
- Type: Wild, Scenic, Recreational
- Designated: October 28, 1988

The Elk River is in southwestern Oregon in the United States. About 29 miles (47 km) long, the river drains a remote 92-square-mile (240 km^{2}) area of the Coast Range into the Pacific Ocean.

Rising in the mountains in northern Curry County, in the Siskiyou National Forest at confluence of its north and south forks, the river initially flows generally west along the south edge of the Grassy Knob Wilderness. It then flows northwest, approaching the coast north of Port Orford and entering the Pacific between Cape Blanco to the north and The Heads to the south.

== Course ==
From the confluence of its two forks, Elk River flows generally west and northwest for about 29 miles (47 km). All but the lowermost 10 miles (16 km) of it are in the Rogue River – Siskiyou National Forest. Forest Road 5325 follows the river along its left bank, becoming County Road 208 (Elk Creek Road) after leaving the national forest. County Road 208 ends when it reaches U.S. Route 101 about 3 miles (5 km) by water from the mouth of the river.

In its first stretch, Elk River receives McCurdy and Blackberry creeks from the left, then Bungalow Creek from the right before Milbury Creek enters from the left at river mile (RM) 26 or river kilometer (RK) 42. About 1 mile (1.6 km) further downstream, Butler Creek enters from the right at Butler Bar Campground, and the river becomes the southern border of Grassy Knob Wilderness. Over the next few miles, Lost and Panther creeks enter from the left, then Sunshine Creek from the right near Sunshine Bar Campground, 19 miles (31 km) from the river mouth. Below this, Red Cedar and Slate creeks enter from the right and Platinum Creek from the left.

After turning more sharply northwest, the river receives Bald Mountain Creek from the left, leaves the wilderness, and reaches the Elk River State Fish Hatchery. At this point, Anvil Creek enters from the right. Below the hatchery, Chapman Creek enters from the left, the river turns sharply north and meanders along the national forest border, crossing it a total of five times and leaving it on the final crossing. At this point, Rock Creek enters from the right 10 miles (16 km) from the mouth. About 4 miles (6 km) further downstream, Bagley Creek enters from the left, and below that Indian Creek enters from the right. After Elk River flows under Route 101, it meanders across the coastal flatland and turns north behind sand dunes. It enters the Pacific Ocean between Cape Blanco on the north and Port Orford on the south. In the ocean opposite the mouth are Orford Reef and a portion of the Oregon Islands National Wildlife Refuge.

== Recreation ==
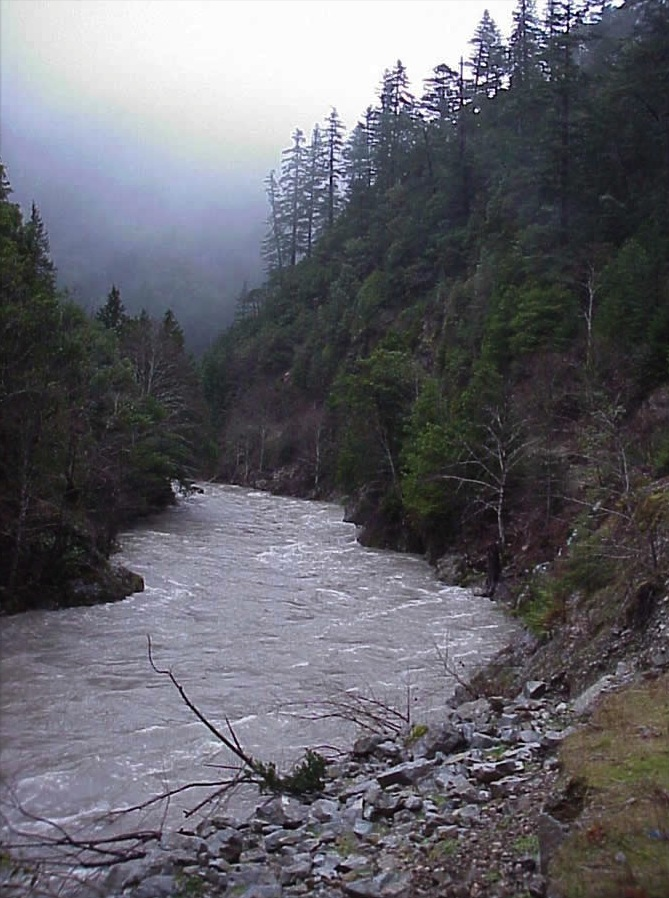
The Elk River at a high water level in 1999

Fishing, camping, hiking, swimming, and wildlife viewing are among the forms of recreation pursued in the Elk River watershed. The river and its tributaries support native chinook salmon, coastal cutthroat trout, winter steelhead, and coho salmon. Fishing is permitted within the national forest boundaries only on the 2 miles (3 km) of the river below the confluence with Bald Mountain Creek. Downstream of the Elk River Hatchery, about 13 miles (21 km) of the river that flows by private land is open for fishing from drift boats.

In 1988, parts of the Elk River and its north fork were designated Wild and Scenic. The lower 2 miles (3.2 km) of the river's north fork are classified "wild." The 17-mile (27 km) segment of the main stem from the confluence of the river's north and south forks to Anvil Creek is classified "recreational."

Three national forest campgrounds—Sunshine Bar and Butler Bar near the main stem and Laird Lake near the south fork— are along Forest Road 5325. The river has many pools that are big enough for swimming.

Whitewater enthusiasts sometimes run all or part of a 12.5-mile (20.1 km) stretch of the river between Butler Creek and the Elk River Hatchery. Rapids vary from class 3 to 4 on the International Scale of River Difficulty.

In 2009, 13,700 acres (55.4 km^{2}) along the north and south forks of Elk River and the upper middle fork of Sixes River were designated as the Copper Salmon Wilderness. The area contains one of the nation's largest remaining stands of low-elevation old-growth forest and one of the healthiest salmon, steelhead, and cutthroat trout runs in the continental United States. Protected species in the region include Port Orford cedar, marbled murrelets and northern spotted owls.

== See also ==
- List of National Wild and Scenic Rivers
- List of Oregon rivers
