= Cape Blanco (Oregon) =

Headland on the coast of Oregon, U.S.

Cape Blanco State Park
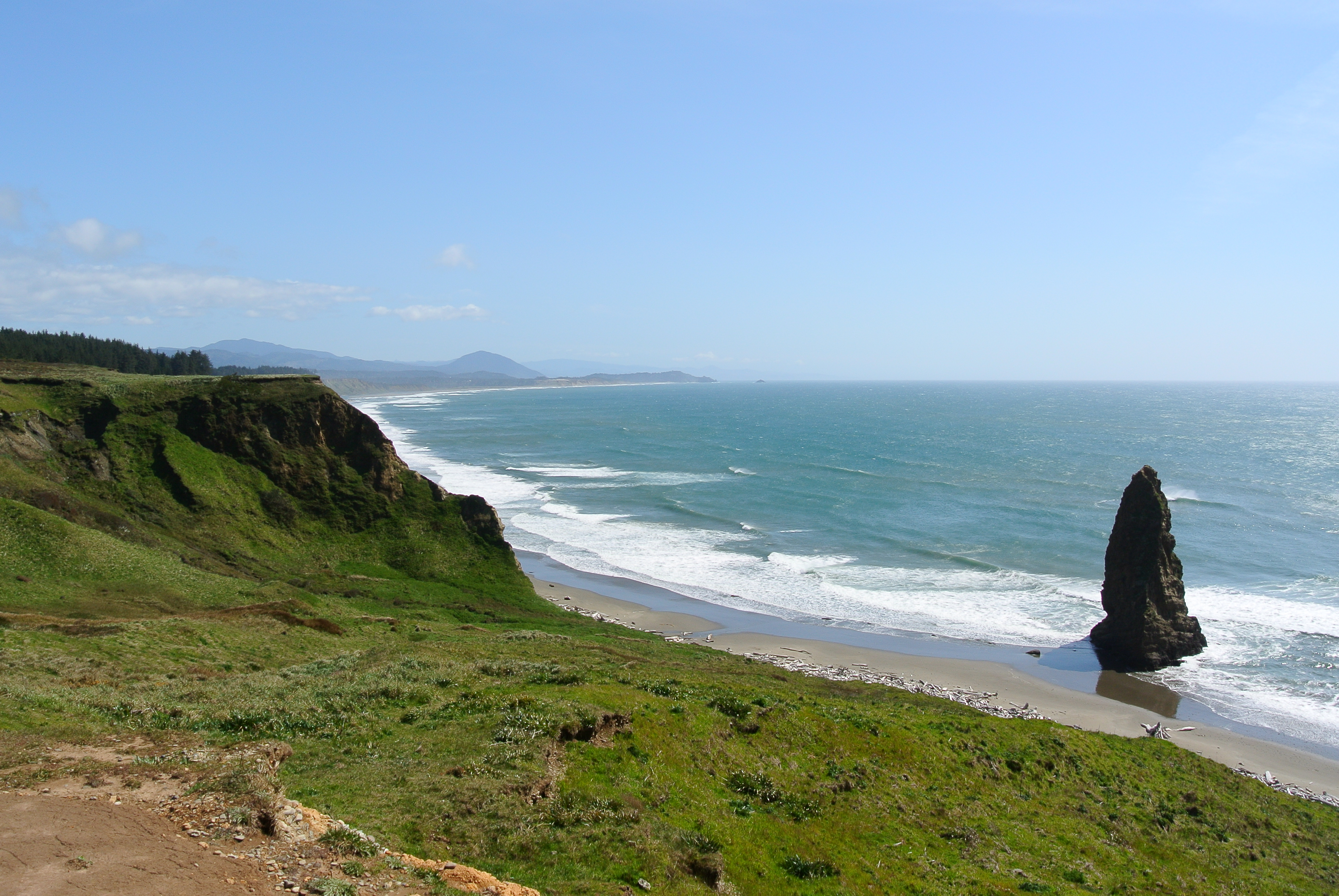
- View from Cape Blanco, looking south towards Port Orford Heads State Park. Humbug Mountain in the distance.

- Location within Oregon Location within the United States
- Interactive map of Cape Blanco State Park
- Type: Public, state
- Location: Curry County, Oregon
- Nearest city: Port Orford
- Coordinates: 42°50′15″N 124°33′50″W
- Area: 1,880 acres (760 ha)
- Operator: Oregon Parks and Recreation Department
- Visitors: Annually, about 350,000 for day-use, 35,000 overnight
- Open: Year-round

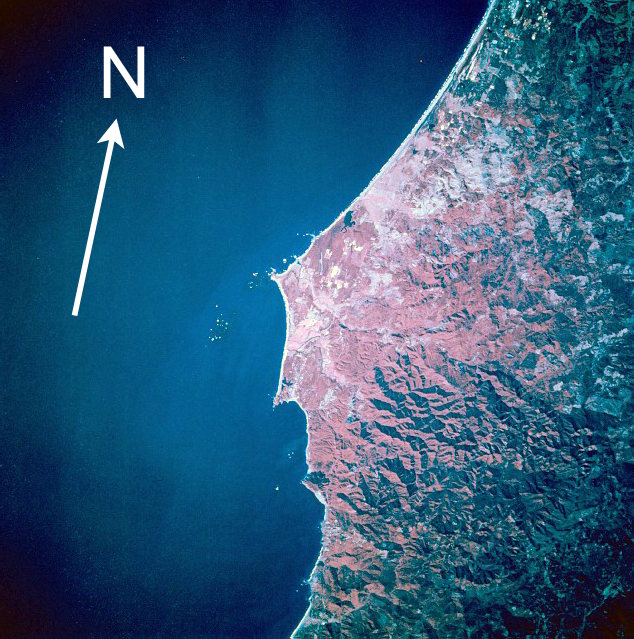
Cape Blanco from space, October 1994

Cape Blanco is a prominent headland on the Pacific Ocean coast of southwestern Oregon in the United States, forming the westernmost point of the state's mainland. Cape Blanco extends farther west than any point of land in the contiguous United States (lower 48 states) except portions of the Olympic Peninsula in Washington, including Cape Alava, the true westernmost point. The cape is part of Cape Blanco State Park and is the location of the Cape Blanco Light, first lit in 1870.

The cape may have been named by explorer Martín de Aguilar in 1603 for its appearance, as blanco means "white" in Spanish. In 1775, Juan Francisco de la Bodega y Quadra named the point Cabo Diligensias. It was later renamed Cape Orford by Captain George Vancouver in 1792, but this name fell into disuse and Cape Blanco became the common usage.

== Geology ==
The cape, a relatively level landform with cliffs facing the sea, is about 200 feet (61 m) higher than the ocean. It consists of layers of uplifted marine sediments, ranging in age from 80 million years at the bottom to less than 500,000 years at the top. The uplift is continuing; Cape Blanco is rising by several millimeters each year. Generally, landforms on the north and south end of the Oregon Coast are rising as the ocean floor slides under the continent, while the central part of the coast "seems to be folding down."

Landforms near the cape include beaches, bluffs, and reefs. Visible to the south are Needle Rock, Blanco Reef, and Humbug Mountain. To the north are Gull Rock, Castle Rock, and Blacklock Point. Blanco Reef is a group of irregular rocks and ledges that are from 2 to 5 miles (3 to 8 km) offshore and are up to 149 feet (45 m) high.

== Geography and climate ==
Cape Blanco is in northern Curry County, about 4 miles (6 km) north of Port Orford, along a mountainous and isolated stretch of the coast bounded to the east by the Coast Range. It lies about 5 miles (8 km) west of U.S. Route 101.

The Sixes River empties into the Pacific Ocean along the north side of the cape. A 2-mile (3 km) walk along the Oregon Coast Trail leads south from the park to the mouth of the Elk River.

Cape Blanco has very mild temperatures year round, with an all-time record high of only 85 °F (29.4 °C). Annual precipitation is high, but there is a distinct drying trend in summer, which gives Cape Blanco a warm-summer Mediterranean climate (Csb) according to the Köppen climate classification system. During winter storms, wind speeds can reach 70 to 100 miles per hour (113 to 161 km/h) at the cape. Extreme winds at the cape and over the Blanco Reef make this part of the coast especially dangerous for ships.

Climate data for Cape Blanco (1961–1990 normals, extremes 1952–1979)
Month	Jan	Feb	Mar	Apr	May	Jun	Jul	Aug	Sep	Oct	Nov	Dec	Year
Record high °F (°C)	75 (24)	72 (22)	67 (19)	68 (20)	75 (24)	71 (22)	76 (24)	71 (22)	79 (26)	82 (28)	71 (22)	70 (21)	82 (28)
Mean maximum °F (°C)	58.9 (14.9)	60.6 (15.9)	59.7 (15.4)	59.6 (15.3)	63.0 (17.2)	64.3 (17.9)	67.3 (19.6)	66.6 (19.2)	68.6 (20.3)	68.9 (20.5)	63.4 (17.4)	58.7 (14.8)	72.8 (22.7)
Mean daily maximum °F (°C)	50.9 (10.5)	51.7 (10.9)	51.7 (10.9)	52.4 (11.3)	54.3 (12.4)	56.6 (13.7)	58.0 (14.4)	59.3 (15.2)	59.3 (15.2)	57.4 (14.1)	52.9 (11.6)	51.5 (10.8)	54.8 (12.7)
Daily mean °F (°C)	46.1 (7.8)	47.6 (8.7)	47.0 (8.3)	47.7 (8.7)	50.1 (10.1)	52.5 (11.4)	54.1 (12.3)	55.1 (12.8)	54.9 (12.7)	53.0 (11.7)	50.1 (10.1)	47.1 (8.4)	50.4 (10.2)
Mean daily minimum °F (°C)	42.0 (5.6)	42.7 (5.9)	42.5 (5.8)	43.3 (6.3)	46.0 (7.8)	48.5 (9.2)	49.9 (9.9)	50.9 (10.5)	50.5 (10.3)	48.5 (9.2)	44.1 (6.7)	42.5 (5.8)	46.1 (7.8)
Mean minimum °F (°C)	30.8 (−0.7)	35.5 (1.9)	34.5 (1.4)	36.6 (2.6)	40.4 (4.7)	44.0 (6.7)	45.9 (7.7)	46.6 (8.1)	45.3 (7.4)	42.8 (6.0)	36.7 (2.6)	33.4 (0.8)	28.8 (−1.8)
Record low °F (°C)	19 (−7)	22 (−6)	25 (−4)	25 (−4)	34 (1)	34 (1)	41 (5)	40 (4)	39 (4)	39 (4)	29 (−2)	17 (−8)	17 (−8)
Average precipitation inches (mm)	13.23 (336)	10.14 (258)	9.63 (245)	5.74 (146)	3.17 (81)	1.27 (32)	0.53 (13)	1.51 (38)	2.45 (62)	5.42 (138)	12.25 (311)	14.15 (359)	79.48 (2,019)
Average snowfall inches (cm)	0.3 (0.76)	trace	0 (0)	trace	0 (0)	0 (0)	0 (0)	0 (0)	0 (0)	0 (0)	0 (0)	trace	0.3 (0.76)
Average precipitation days (≥ 0.01 inch)	17.9	16.5	16.6	14.5	10.3	6.7	3.3	4.7	6.4	10.6	18.8	19.5	145.8
Average snowy days (≥ 0.1 inch)	0.1	0.0	0.0	0.0	0.0	0.0	0.0	0.0	0.0	0.0	0.0	0.0	0.1
Source 1: WRCC
Source 2: XMACIS (snowfall)

== Recreation ==
Activities at the park include hiking, horseback riding, fishing, camping, picnicking, and beachcombing, among others, and visiting the lighthouse, a pioneer cemetery, or the Hughes House, on the National Register of Historic Places.

The property belonged originally to Patrick Hughes, who came to the cape in 1860 in search of gold and who eventually established a 2,000-acre (810 ha) dairy ranch along the lower Sixes River. Restored by the Friends of Cape Blanco, the two-story, eleven-room ranch house was completed in 1898.

== Literature ==
In Jules Verne's early science fiction book The Begum's Millions, a utopian community named Ville-France is established in 1872 on the South Oregon beach. Verne gives the location of this fictitious community as "eighty kilometers north of Cape Blanco". Cape Blanco is also noted on a map of Brobdingnag in Gulliver's Travels.

== Gallery ==
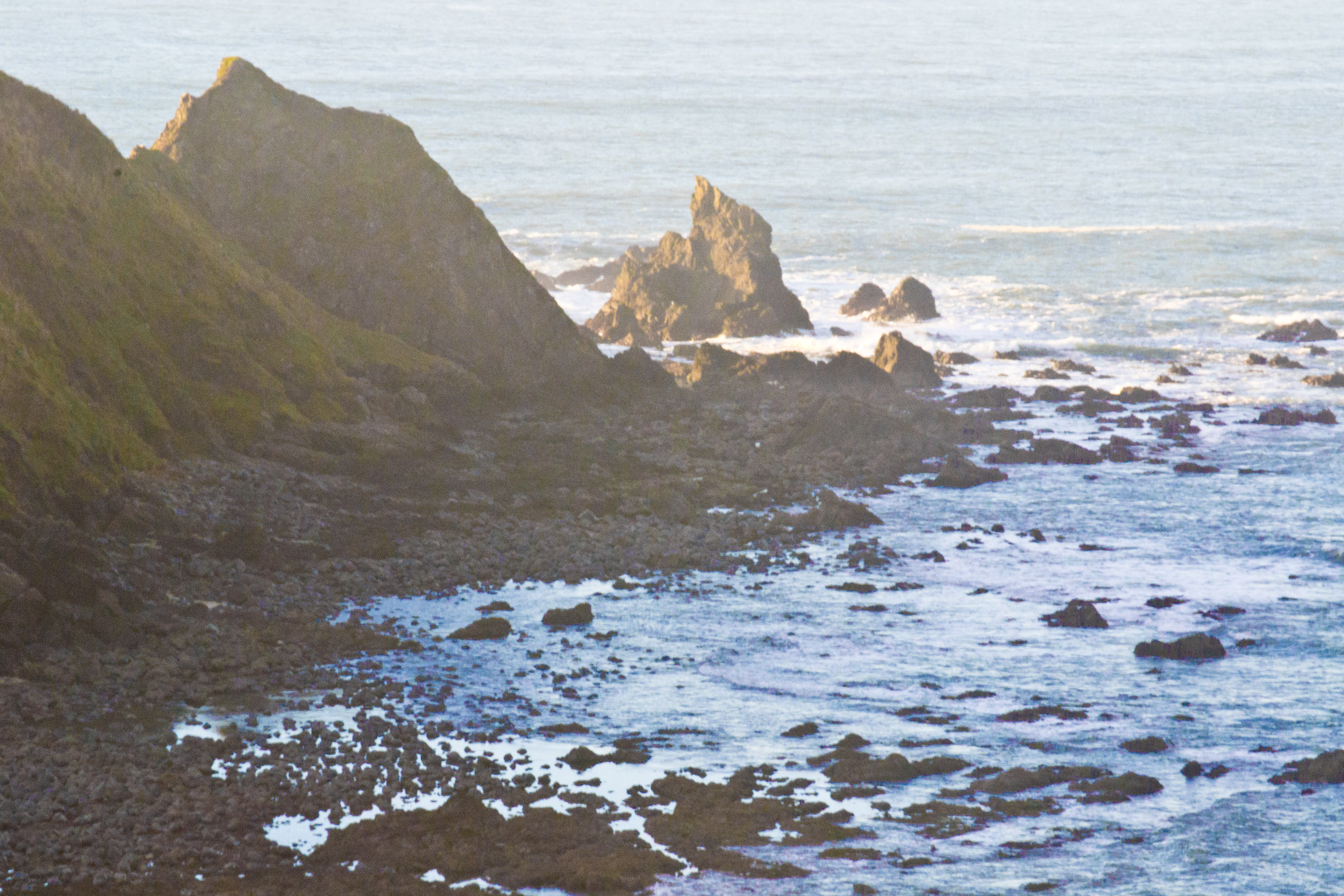
North side of the Cape

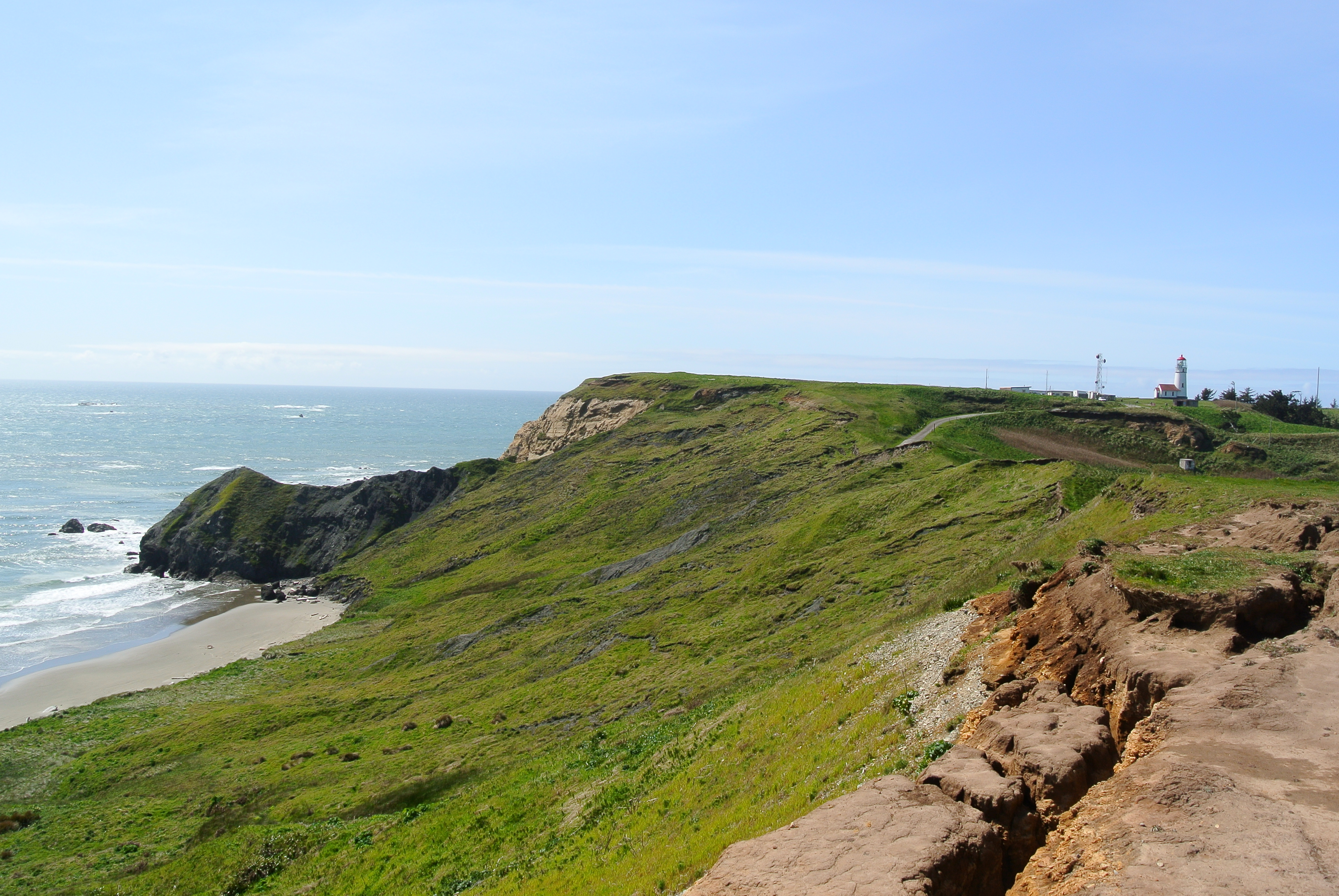
Cape Blanco and lighthouse

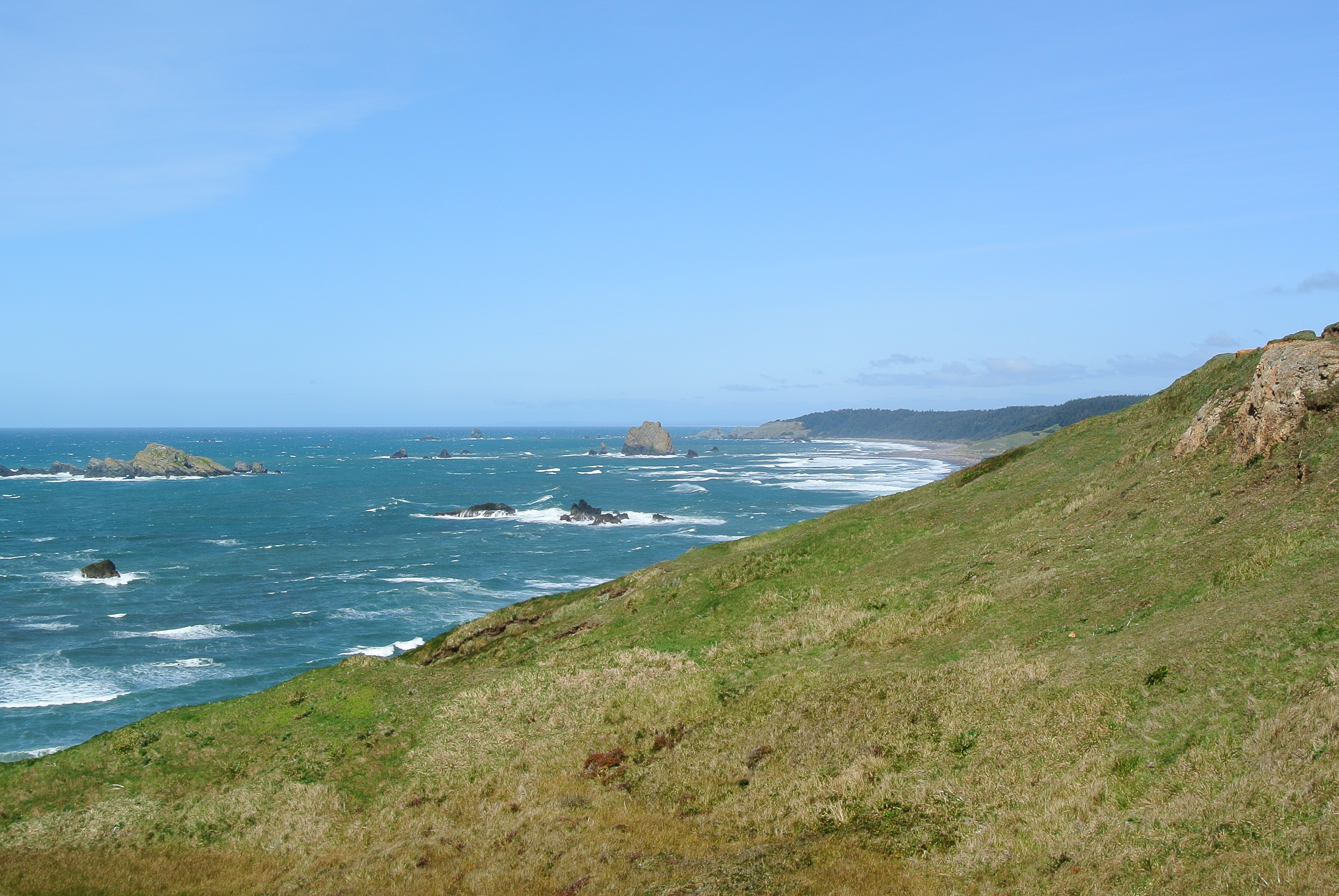
Cape Blanco looking north towards Gulf Rock, Castle Rock and Floras Lake State Park

== See also ==
- Blanco fracture zone
- Cape Blanco (disambiguation)
- Cape Blanco State Airport
- Cape Mendocino
- Extreme points of U.S. states
- List of Oregon state parks
