= The Heads (British band) =

British psychedelic rock band

The Heads are an English psychedelic rock band formed in Bristol in 1990 consisting of Paul Allen (vocals/guitar), H. O. Morgan (bass), Wayne Maskell (drums), and Simon Price (vocals/guitar).

== History ==
Originally formed in 1990 by Hugo Morgan, Simon Price and Dave Spencer (guitar) from the remnants of Bristol bands Quinton and The Spasmodics respectively. They were joined by Wayne Maskell a few months later and played music somewhat influenced by Loop, Spacemen 3 and The Stooges. This line up lasted for 2 years, playing support slots to bands such as Babes in Toyland and Swervedriver, but without any record releases (although an early version of Spliff Riff appeared on the Sessions 1 7-inch released by Rocket records in 1999).

Their first single was released in 1994, entitled The QUAD EP. This has become a collector's item with its Russ Meyer-inspired sleeve and initial copies including a packet of cigarette papers with the name of the band printed on the front.

The band recorded three Peel Sessions between 1995 and 2000, as well as a session for Mark Radcliffe.

== Discography ==
=== Albums ===
- Relaxing With... – Headhunter Records (1995)

CD/LP – LP 1000 copies, 100 copies came with an insert, also, some inserts were personalised/doodled on by the band.

- The Time Is Now – Mans Ruin Records (1998)

CD – Compilation of two 10-inches and two split 7-inches.

- Everybody Knows We Got Nowhere – Sweet Nothing Records (2000)

CD/LP – 2×LP 1000 copies.

- Undersided – Sweet Nothing Records (2002)

CD/LP – 2×LP 1000 copies.

- At Last – Rooster / Sweet Nothing / Rocket (2003)

CD/LP – CD 1st edition (on Rooster) in sleeve 100 copies, 2nd edition (on Rooster) in jewel case 60 copies, 3rd edition (on Sweet Nothing) 1000 copies. LP on Rocket Recordings, 500 copies, light blue coloured vinyl issued with 3 different silk-screened covers; blue & red, red & white, blue & white. These covers were not pressed in equal amounts, the blue & white and the red & white were the rarer editions. The blue & white being the rarest with 30+/- copies made.

- 33 – Rooster / Invada Records (2004)

CD/LP – CD Originally a pressing of just 33 copies on black cds in a flipback cover, inside a Rooster outer bag. 2nd CD edition jewel case (on Rooster) 60(100?)copies pressed. LP on Invada Records, 1st pressing on black vinyl 500 copies (100 copies came with a numbered insert). 2nd pressing on blue vinyl 500 copies.

- Under The Stress of a Headlong Dive – Invada Records / Alternative Tentacles (2005)

CD/LP – 2×LP on Rocket & Invada Records 1000 copies. CD released in UK on Invada Records has an orange and silver cover, whilst the US version on Alternative Tentacles is purple and silver.

- Dead in the Water – Rooster / Invada Records (2005/2006/2007)

CD/LP – CD Originally 100 numbered copies in card sleeve. CD 2nd edition in jewel case, 30 numbered copies (both on Rooster in 2005). 2×LP 500 copies pink/red vinyl (on Invada in 2006). CD 3rd edition 1000 copies (on Rooster in 2007).

- Rituals From The Heads & The Big Naturals Volume One – Rooster (2007)

CD – 100 numbered copies in card sleeve. 2nd edition (Stoned From The Underground Special Edition 7/7/7) 30 numbered copies in card sleeve inside a plastic Rooster outer bag with sticker on the front.

- Rituals From The Heads & The Big Naturals Volume Two – Rooster (2007)

CD – 100 numbered copies in card sleeve. 2nd edition (Stoned From The Underground Special Edition 7/7/7) 30 numbered copies in card sleeve inside a plastic Rooster outer bag with sticker on the front.

- Bedlam – Rooster (2008)

CD – 1st edition 100 numbered copies in blue card sleeve. 2nd edition (Roadburn Edition) 30 numbered copies in orange card sleeve. 3rd edition (Rocket Anniversary Edition) 30 numbered copies in yellow card sleeve.

- Irrepressible Heads – Chicken Slide Records (2008)

CD – 100 (60?) copies, half of them came in Chicken Slide paper bags...

- Time in Space – Rooster (2008)

CD – 1st edition 100 numbered copies. 2nd edition ("World Tour Edition"!), same cover as the 1st edition but in inverted blue and red colours, <100 copies.

- Tilburg – Rooster (2008/2009)

CD/LP – CD 1st edition gatefold sleeve, 200 numbered copies, released in 2008. CD 2nd edition (Stoned Hand of Doom Edition 16 May 2009), 30 copies(?). 2×LP 500 copies.

- Time in Space Vol.2 – Rooster (2009)

2×CD – 1st edition gatefold sleeve 100 numbered copies. 2×CD 2nd edition card sleeve, 100 (150?) copies.

- Time in Space Vol.3 – Rooster (2010)

CD – 1st edition card sleeve, 150 numbered copies, first 30 copies have a purple back cover and label.

- Live at the Koko – Rooster (2010)

CD – Recorded during their support set for Mudhoney in October 2009. 150 copies, first 50 copies came in a brown paper bag with 'Live at the Koko' stamped on.

- Relaxing With... – Rooster (2010)

2×CD – Remastered edition, includes Peel Sessions and out-takes.

- Rituals From The Heads & The Big Naturals Volume Three – Rooster (2011)

CD – 150 numbered copies, first 50 copies came in a brown paper bag with a spiral print.

- Relaxing With Rehearsals – Rooster (2011)

CD – 150 numbered copies, first 100 copies came in a paper bag with Quad/Ultravixen print.

- Vertigo Swill – Rooster (2011)

CD – 1st edition, 88 numbered copies. 2nd edition, front/back covers reversed, 100 copies.

- Enten-Eller – Rooster (2012)

CD – 100 numbered copies. Gatefold sleeve.

- Inner Space Broadcasts Vol 2 – Cardinal Fuzz (2013)

2CD Limited Edition.CD 2 – A collection of recordings from The Heads' rehearsal room.

The Heads have released numerous editions of their albums, in extremely limited quantities – usually two or three editions with altered artwork or sleeves and usually less than 100 copies, not to mention rarer promo editions (five to ten copies). This trend seems to have begun with the original release of "33" – so called because of the 33 copies they pressed.

The band sometimes take it in turns to produce each release, e.g Everybody Knows We Got Nowhere was designed by Simon. Irrepressible was designed by Hugo. Time in Space was designed by Wayne and Vertigo Swill was designed by Paul. A friend of the band, Johnny O, also sometimes lends a hand in designing the sleeves and covers.

As a result of these limited pressings and altered sleeves the band have managed to create a niche market, where completists can end up paying more than 20 times the original price for a CD – usually via eBay.

== See also ==
- List of bands from Bristol
- Culture of Bristol
