= Carpenterville, Oregon =

Unincorporated community in the state of Oregon, United States

- Unincorporated community
- Location within the state of Oregon Carpenterville (the United States)
- Coordinates: 42°13′12″N 124°20′22″W
- Country: United States
- State: Oregon
- County: Curry
- Established: 1932
- Elevation: 1,634 ft (498 m)
- Time zone: UTC-8 (Pacific (PST))
  - Summer (DST): UTC-7 (PDT)
- ZIP code: 97415
- Area codes: 458 and 541
- GNIS feature ID: 1139388

Carpenterville is an unincorporated community in Curry County, Oregon, United States. The community is located on the former alignment of U.S. Route 101 known as the Roosevelt Highway (now Oregon Route 255 or the Carpenterville Highway), approximately 16 miles north of Brookings. Carpenterville was the highest point on the former main coastal highway and the area is known for its views.

== History ==
D. W. Carpenter and his family settled in the area in 1921. The family ran a sawmill that produced lumber for fences. Carpenterville post office was established in 1932 and named for the Carpenter family. In 1940, Carpenterville's population was 35. The post office closed in 1944. When Carpenterville was still on the main route of the Coast Highway, there was a public school, a store, tourist cabins, and a lodge, the Skyline Lodge and Restaurant. The realignment of the highway cut the community off from the main coastal road. By 1990, there was only one house to mark the location of the community, however the USGS still classifies Carpenterville as a populated place.

== See also ==
- List of ghost towns in Oregon
