= List of plants known as laurel =

List of plants

Laurel is part of the English common name of many trees and other plants with glossy evergreen leaves, most of which are not closely related to each other.

Plants called "laurel" include:

- Alexandrian laurel:
  - Calophyllum inophyllum, an evergreen tree in family Calophyllaceae
  - Danae racemosa, a small shrub in family Asparagaceae
- Azores laurel, Laurus azorica
- Bog laurel:
  - Kalmia microphylla
  - Kalmia polifolia
- California laurel, Umbellularia californica
- Camphor laurel, Cinnamomum camphora
- Canary laurel, Laurus novocanariensis
- Cape laurel, Ocotea bullata
- Cherry laurel, Prunus laurocerasus
- Chilean laurel, Laurelia sempervirens
- Chinese laurel, Antidesma bunius
- Copper laurel, Eupomatia laurina, a flowering-plant family Eupomatiaceae
- Ecuador laurel, Cordia alliodora
- English Laurel, Prunus laurocerasus
- Grecian or bay laurel, Laurus nobilis
- Great laurel, Rhododendron maximum
- Hedge laurel, Pittosporum erioloma
- Indian laurel (disambiguation)
- Japanese laurel, Aucuba japonica
- Laurel clock vine, Thunbergia laurifolia
- Laurel sumac, Malosma laurina
- Mountain laurel (disambiguation), several plants
- New Zealand laurel:
  - Corynocarpus laevigatus
  - Coprosma repens
- Pig laurel, Kalmia angustifolia
- Portugal laurel, Prunus lusitanica
- Sheep laurel, Kalmia angustifolia
- Spineless butcher's-broom, Ruscus hypoglossum
- Spotted laurel, Aucuba japonica
- Spurge laurel, Daphne laureola
- Swamp laurel:
  - Kalmia microphylla
  - Kalmia polifolia

== See also ==
- Laurel wreath
