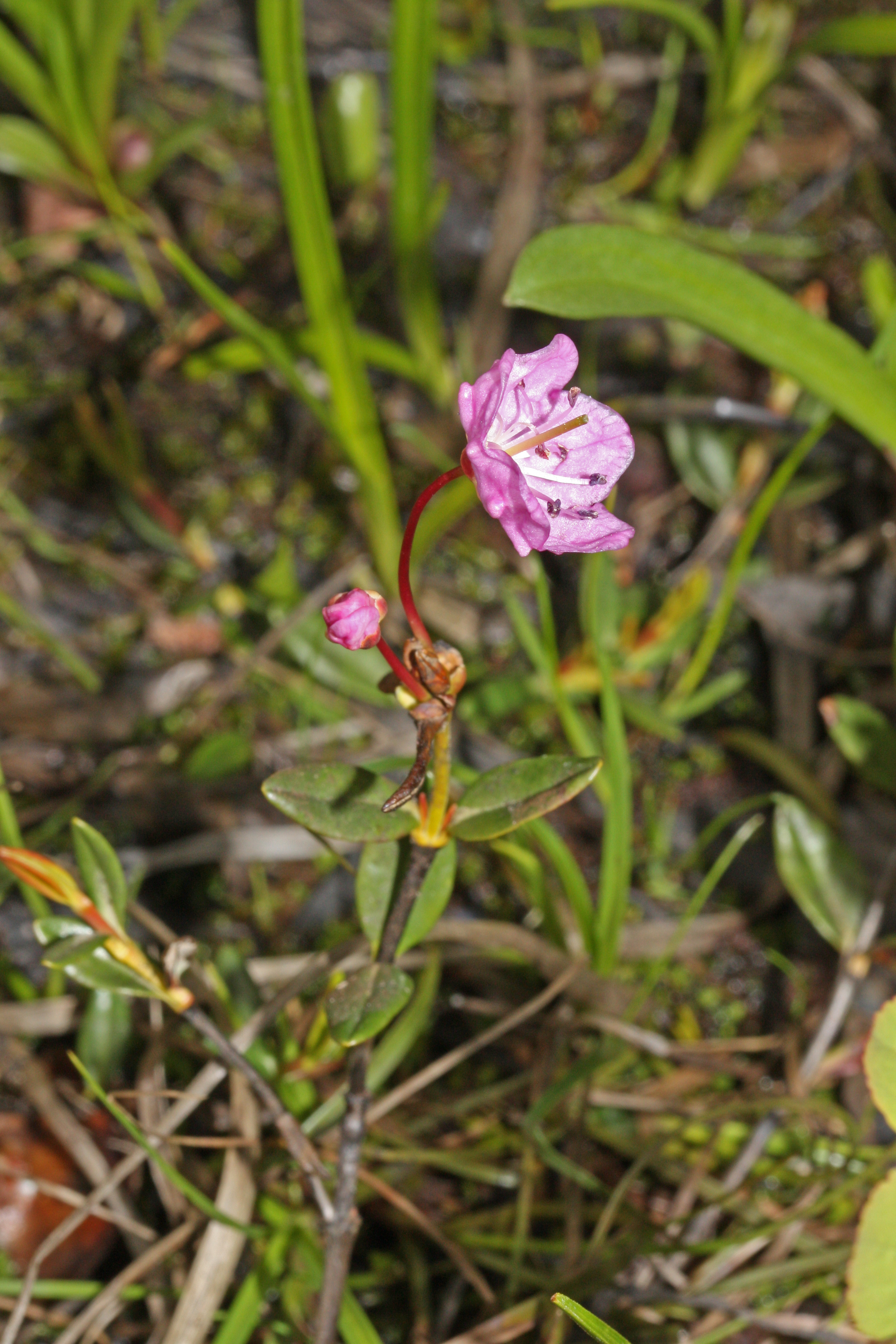

Conservation status
- Least Concern (IUCN 3.1)

- Secure (NatureServe)

Scientific classification
- Kingdom: Plantae
- Clade: Tracheophytes
- Clade: Angiosperms
- Clade: Eudicots
- Clade: Asterids
- Order: Ericales
- Family: Ericaceae
- Genus: Kalmia
- Species: K. microphylla

Binomial name
- Kalmia microphylla (Hook.) A.Heller

= Kalmia microphylla =

Species of flowering plant

Kalmia microphylla, known as alpine laurel, bog laurel, swamp-laurel, western bog-laurel or western laurel, is a species of Kalmia of the family Ericaceae. It is native to North America and can be found throughout the western US and western and central Canada below the subarctic.

== Etymology ==
Kalmia, the genus, is named after Swedish-Finn botanist Pehr Kalm, a student of Carl Linnaeus, while microphylla derives from Ancient Greek meaning "small leaves".

== Description ==
Kalmia microphylla are characterized as being short, shrubs that have a maximum height of 24 inches and their growth rarely surpasses 6 ft. This plant is easily mistaken for the K. polifolia "bog-laurel" because of the similar characteristics of their flowers. K. microphylla can be distinguished by their clusters of pink or purple bell shaped flowers. The flowers are held within five fused petals that open in the shape of a cup. The stamens held within the petals react to insects that land on them by covering them with pollen. The plant produces green fruits, which are small and hard in form. Fruits are five parted capsules. The leaves of this plant are oppositely attached and are not deciduous. Leaves are distinctly lanceolate in shape with rolled leaf edges, a leathery texture, and dark green color. The plant's branches and twigs are fuzzy in early growth and then during maturity become smooth and reddish brown to grayish in color.

== Distribution and habitat ==
This is a perennial species and has active growth during spring and summer. These plants can frequently be found in alpine meadows, open wet areas and bogs. The habitat in which it optimally grows in open heath or shrublands with moist soil. The soil must have very low levels of calcium carbonate because the plant is intolerant of alkaline conditions. Distribution of Kalmia microphylla ranges from Alaska to California and now has expanded through much of northern Canada.

== Uses ==
The kalmias are very poisonous plants, containing grayanotoxin. Kalmia microphylla has also been used for medicinal purposes in creating external washes for skin diseases.

== Gallery ==
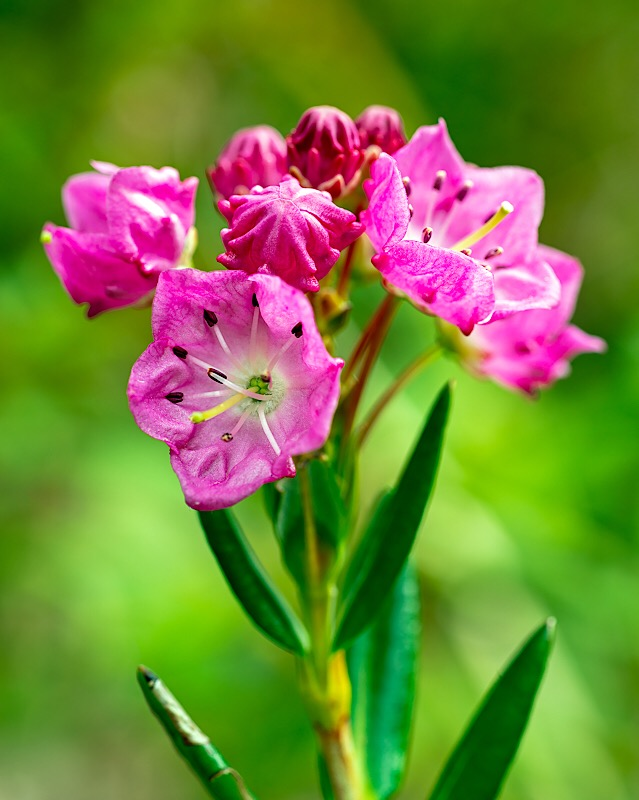
Kalmia microphylla

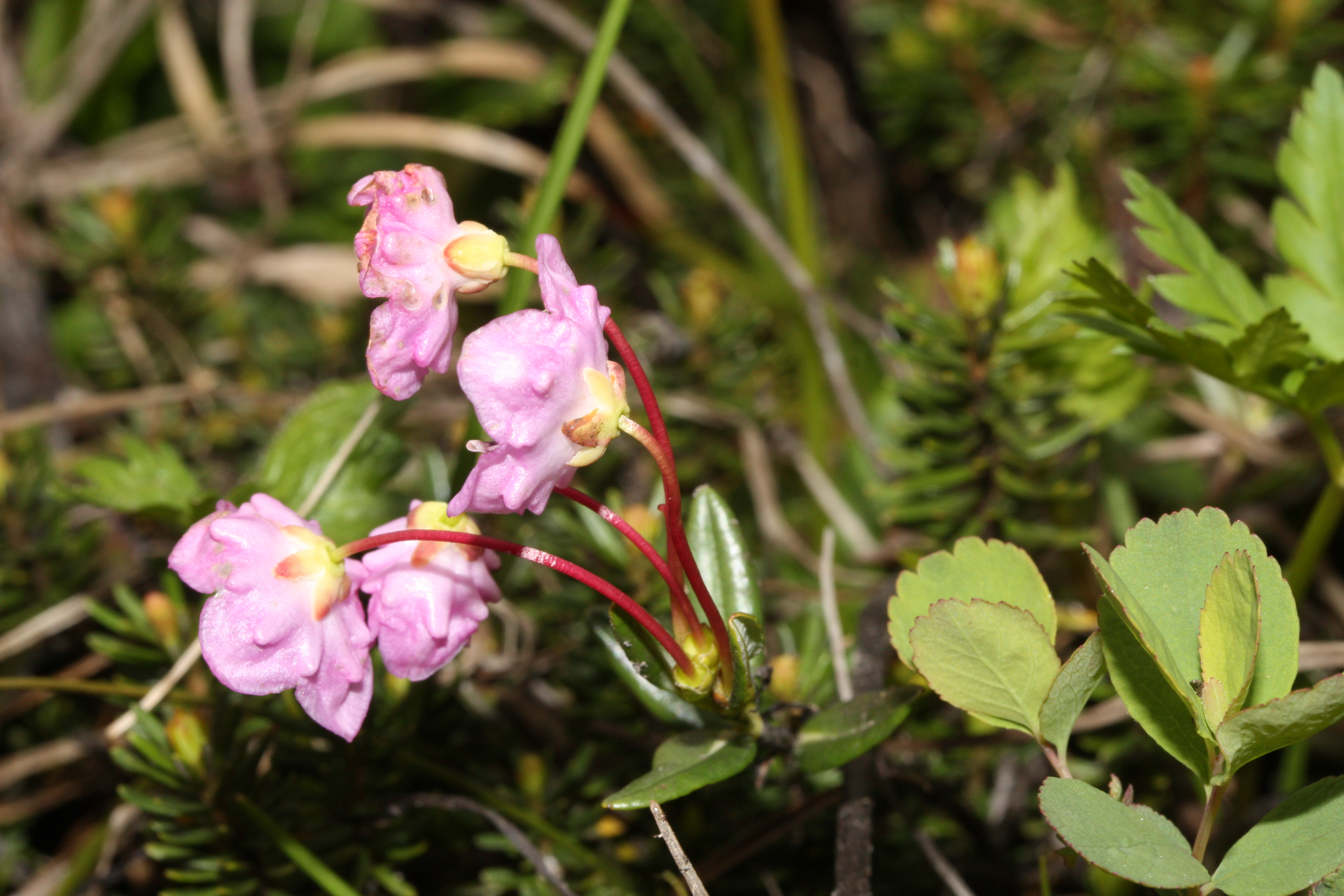

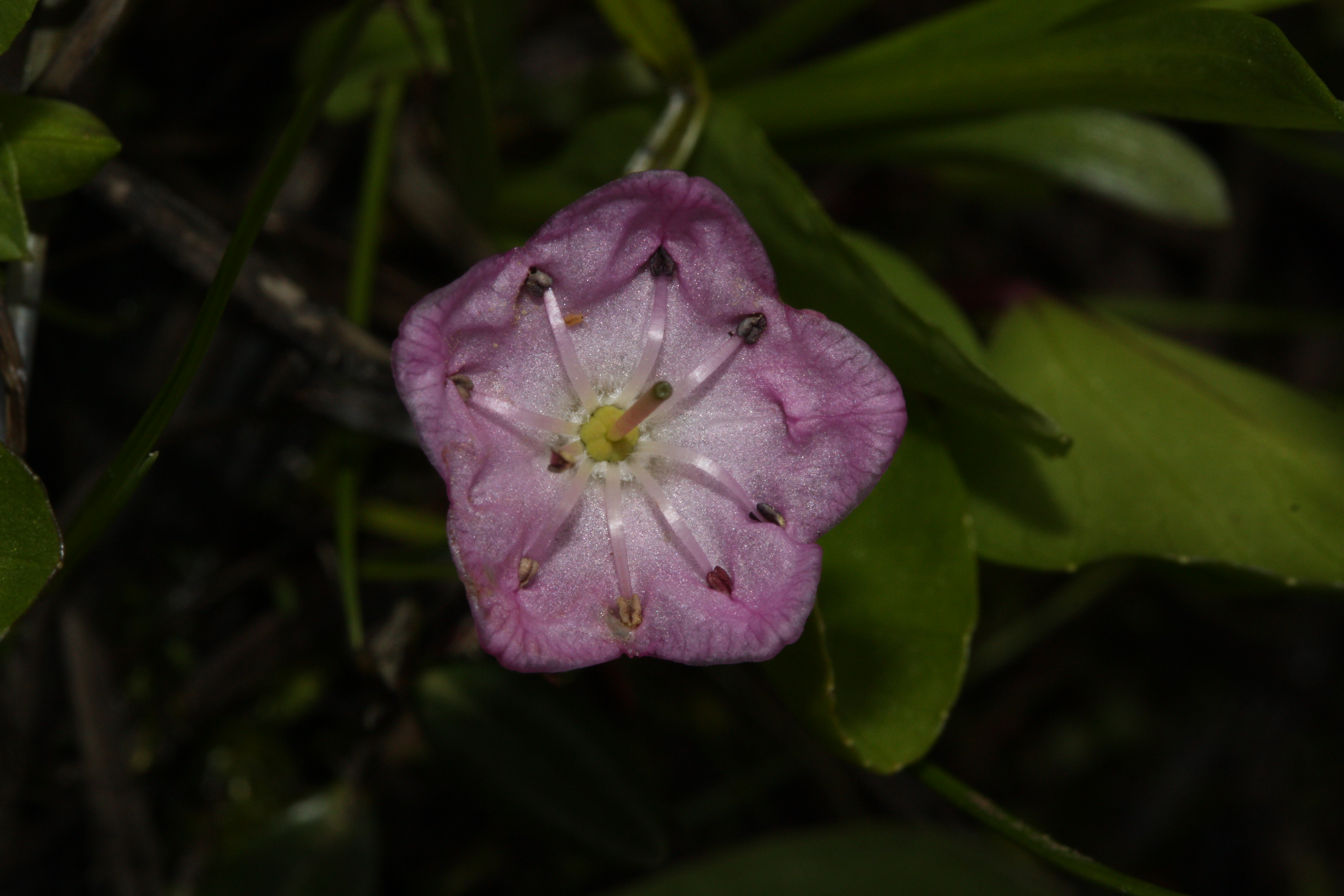

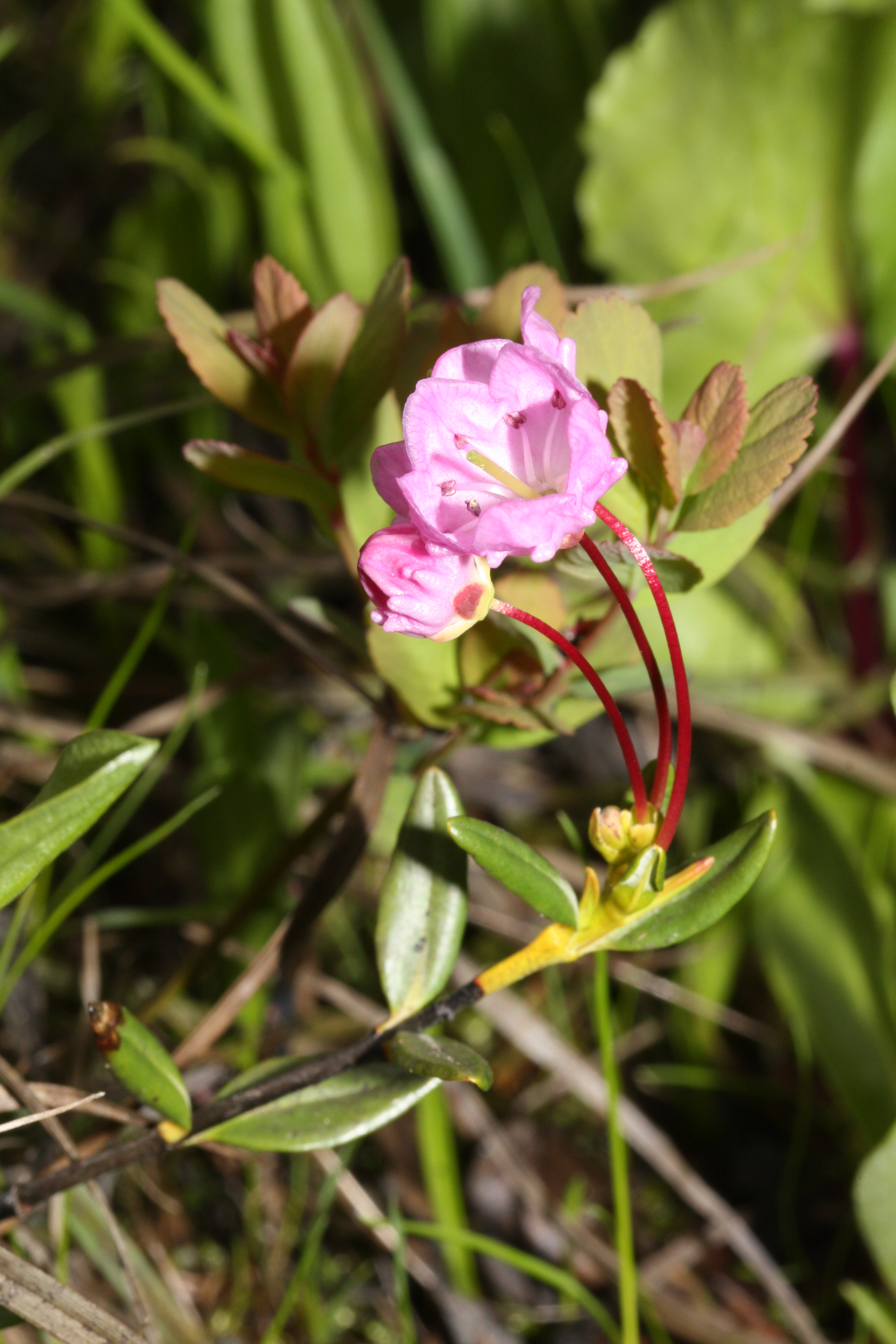

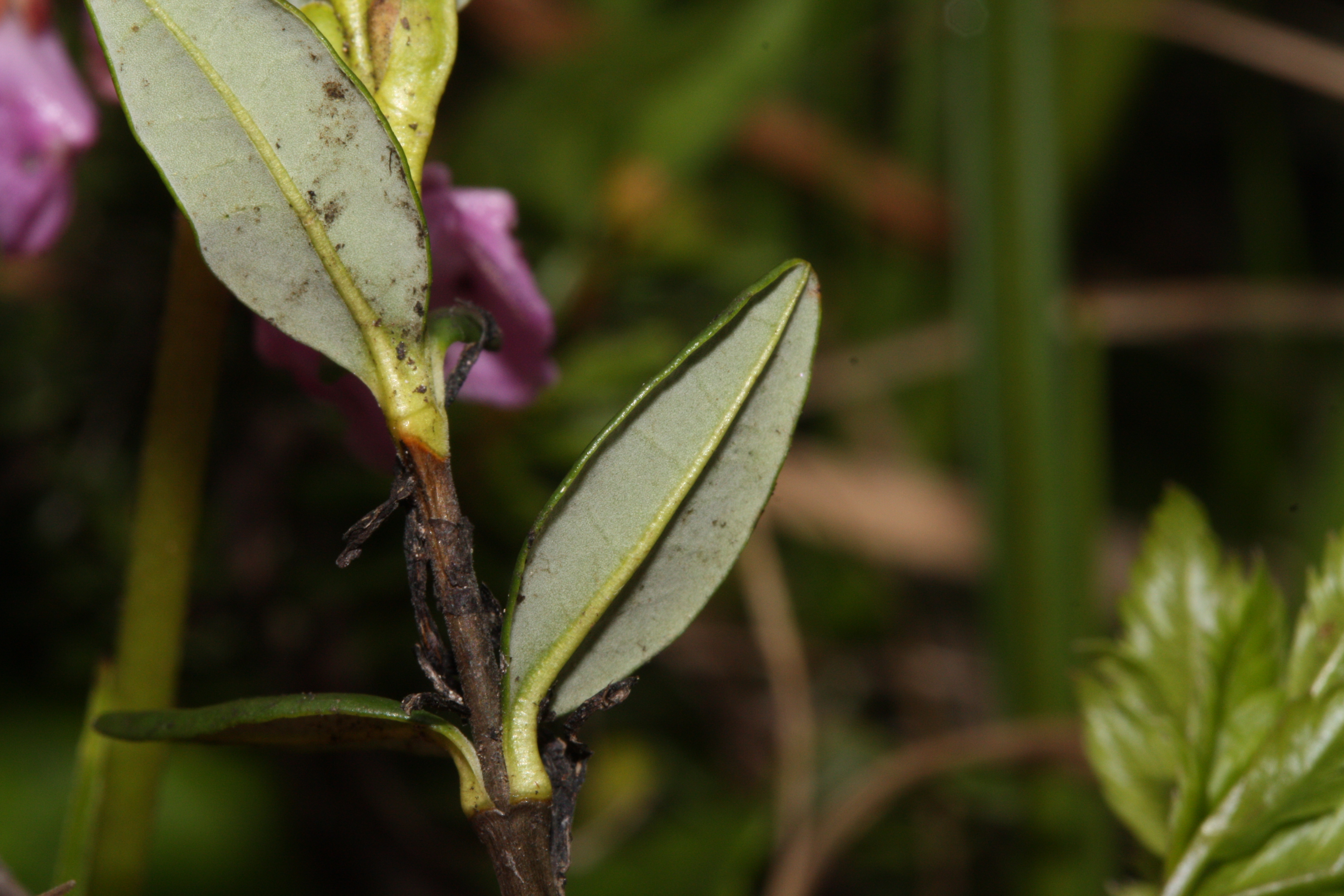
