= Coleophora kalmiella =

Scientific classification
- Kingdom: Animalia
- Phylum: Arthropoda
- Class: Insecta
- Order: Lepidoptera
- Family: Coleophoridae
- Genus: Coleophora
- Species: C. kalmiella

Binomial name
- Coleophora kalmiella (McDunnough, 1936)

Synonyms
- Haploptilia kalmiella McDunnough, 1936

Species of moth

Coleophora kalmiella is a moth of the family Coleophoridae. It is found in Canada, including Nova Scotia.

The larvae feed on the leaves of Kalmia species. They create a composite leaf case.
