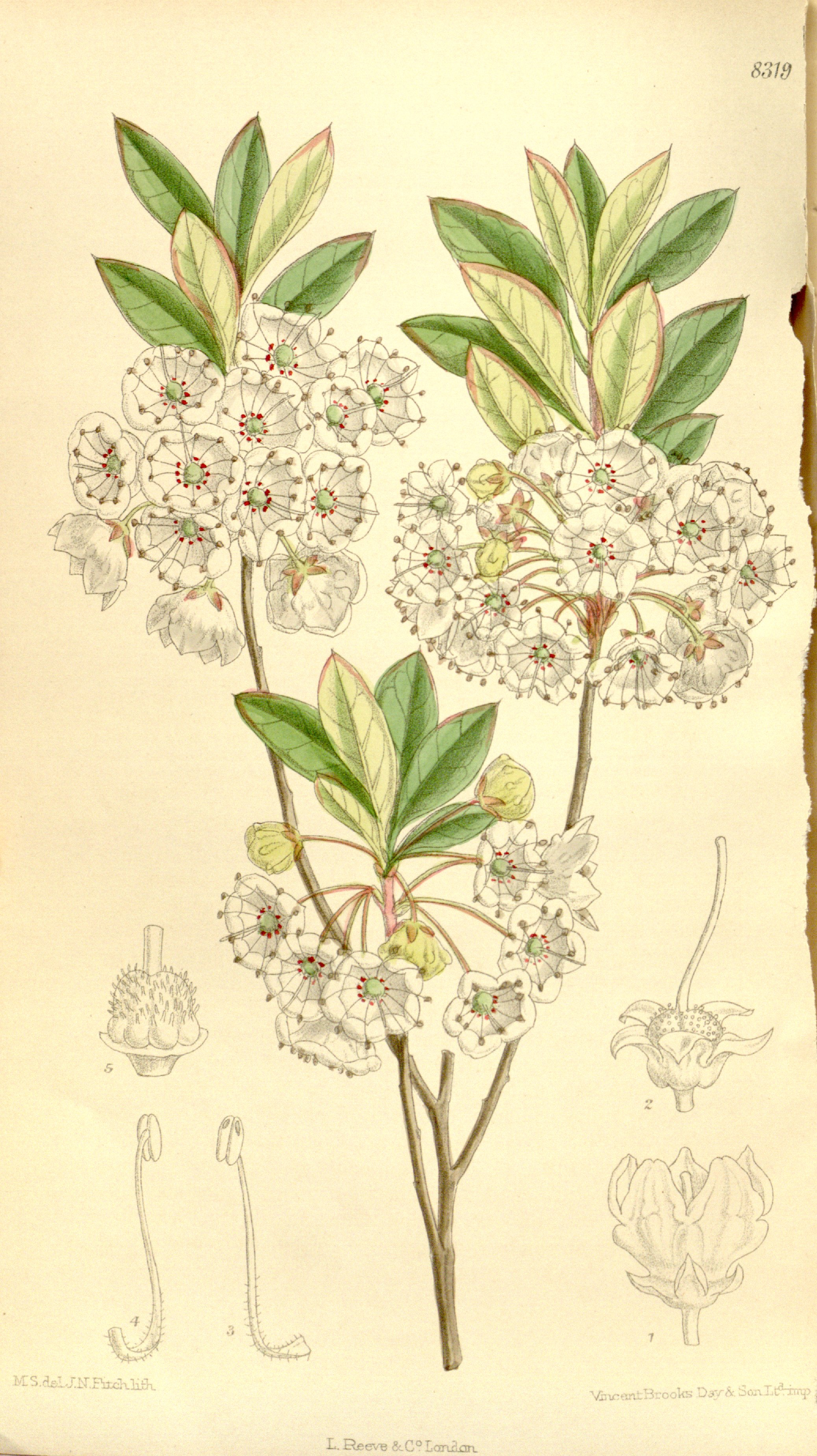
- 1910 illustration

Conservation status
- Vulnerable (NatureServe)

Scientific classification
- Kingdom: Plantae
- Clade: Tracheophytes
- Clade: Angiosperms
- Clade: Eudicots
- Clade: Asterids
- Order: Ericales
- Family: Ericaceae
- Genus: Kalmia
- Species: K. cuneata

Binomial name
- Kalmia cuneata Michx.

Synonyms
- Chamaedaphne cuneata (Michx.) Kuntze

= Kalmia cuneata =

Species of flowering plant

Kalmia cuneata is a species of flowering plant in the heath family known by the common name whitewicky, sometimes spelled white-wicky or white wicky. It is native to the eastern United States, where it occurs only in North Carolina and South Carolina.

Kalmia cuneata is a shrub growing up to 1.5 to 2 meters (5-6.7 feet) tall. It is deciduous, a key identifying characteristic. The leaves are widely lance-shaped, measuring up to 6 centimeters (2.4 inches) long by 3 cm (1.2 inches) wide, and light green, turning red in the fall. They are alternately arranged. The lateral inflorescence is a raceme or fascicle of up to 10 flowers. The five petals are joined into a lobed, open corolla which is white with a red ring near the center. In the center are ten stamens. The fruit is a small capsule. This species is easily told from Kalmia carolina, which is evergreen and has pink flowers and oppositely arranged leaves. It also occurs in the same region as Kalmia latifolia, which is evergreen and has terminal inflorescences.

Kalmia cuneata grows mainly in the ecotone between the Carolina Sandhills and adjacent pocosins. The soils are moist and acidic. It grows alongside many other types of shrubs, such as the ericaceous species Rhododendron viscosum, Lyonia lucida, L. ligustrina var. foliosiflora, Vaccinium corymbosum, Zenobia pulverulenta, Leucothoe racemosa, Oxydendrum arboreum, and Gaylussacia frondosa, and other shrubs such as Clethra alnifolia, Ilex glabra, I. coriacea, Aronia arbutifolia, and Fothergilla gardenii. There are trees in the habitat, but they are small and do not provide much canopy. The trees are kept low by wildfire, which prevents the succession of large trees into the shrub and herb layer.

Kalmia cuneata occurs in seven North Carolina counties and one South Carolina county. Its current range is similar to its historical range, but it occurs in less total area within that range.

The main threat to the plant is fire suppression, which prevents the natural fire regime. Other forms of habitat loss include the conversion of land for agriculture, including silviculture operations, and development for other uses such as residential space.
