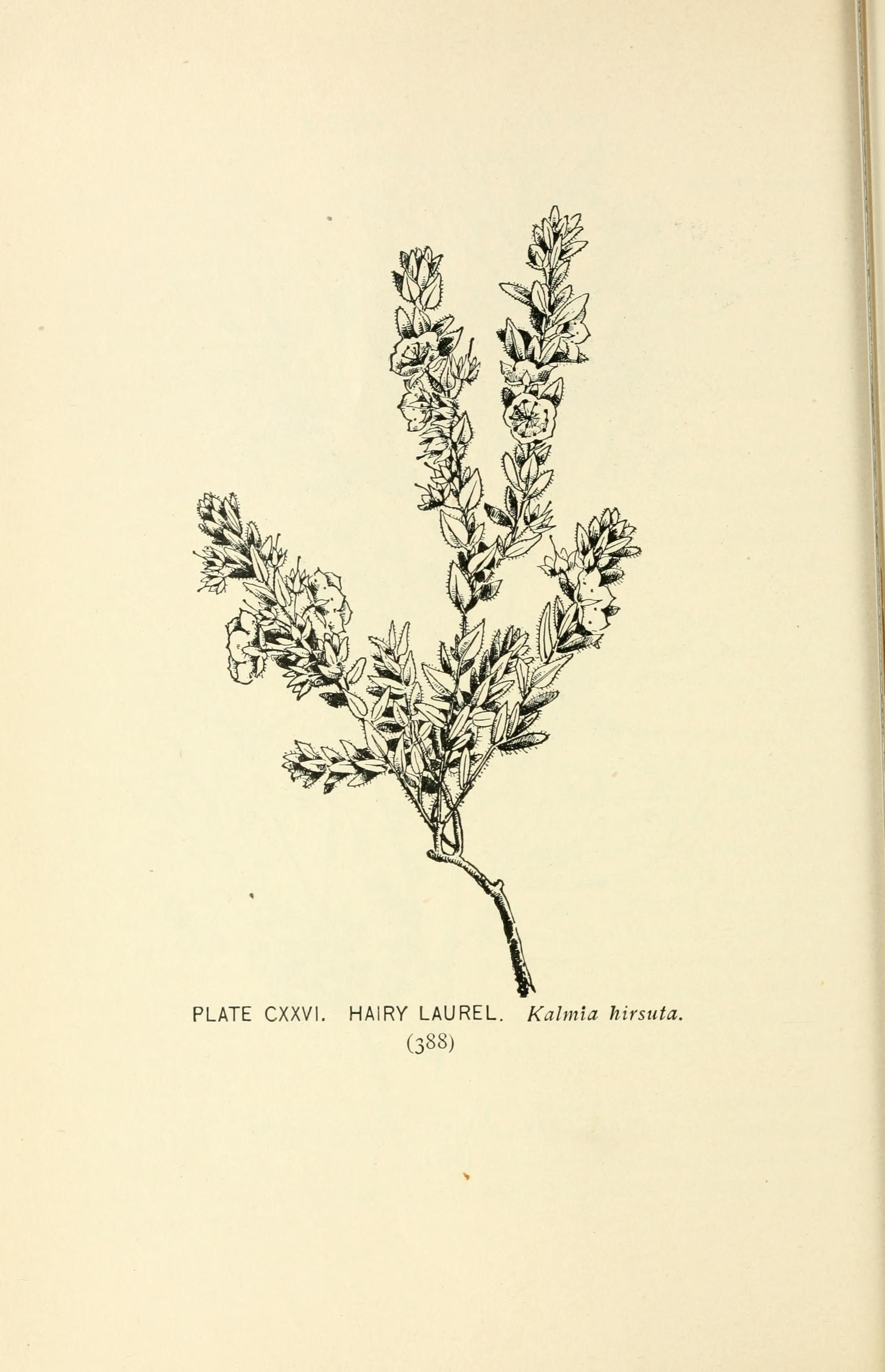

Scientific classification
- Kingdom: Plantae
- Clade: Tracheophytes
- Clade: Angiosperms
- Clade: Eudicots
- Clade: Asterids
- Order: Ericales
- Family: Ericaceae
- Genus: Kalmia
- Species: K. hirsuta

Binomial name
- Kalmia hirsuta Walter

Synonyms
- Chamaedaphne hirsuta (Walter) Kuntze; Kalmia ciliata W. Bartram; Kalmiella hirsuta (Walter) Small

= Kalmia hirsuta =

Species of flowering plant

Kalmia hirsuta, the hairy mountain-laurel or hairy wicky, is a plant species native to the southeastern United States. It is reported from Florida, Georgia, Alabama and South Carolina. It grows in open, sandy locations such as savannahs, sand hills and pine barrens at elevations of less than 100 m (330 feet).

The epithet "hirsuta" means "covered with coarse stiff hairs", appropriate as the hairiness of the leaves is one major character in distinguishing this species from its relatives. Kalmia hirsuta is a shrub up to 1.2 m (4 feet) tall. Leaves are elliptic to ovate, up to 14 mm (0.6 inches) long. Inflorescences form in the axils of the leaves, with 1-5 flowers. Flowers are pink with red spots.
