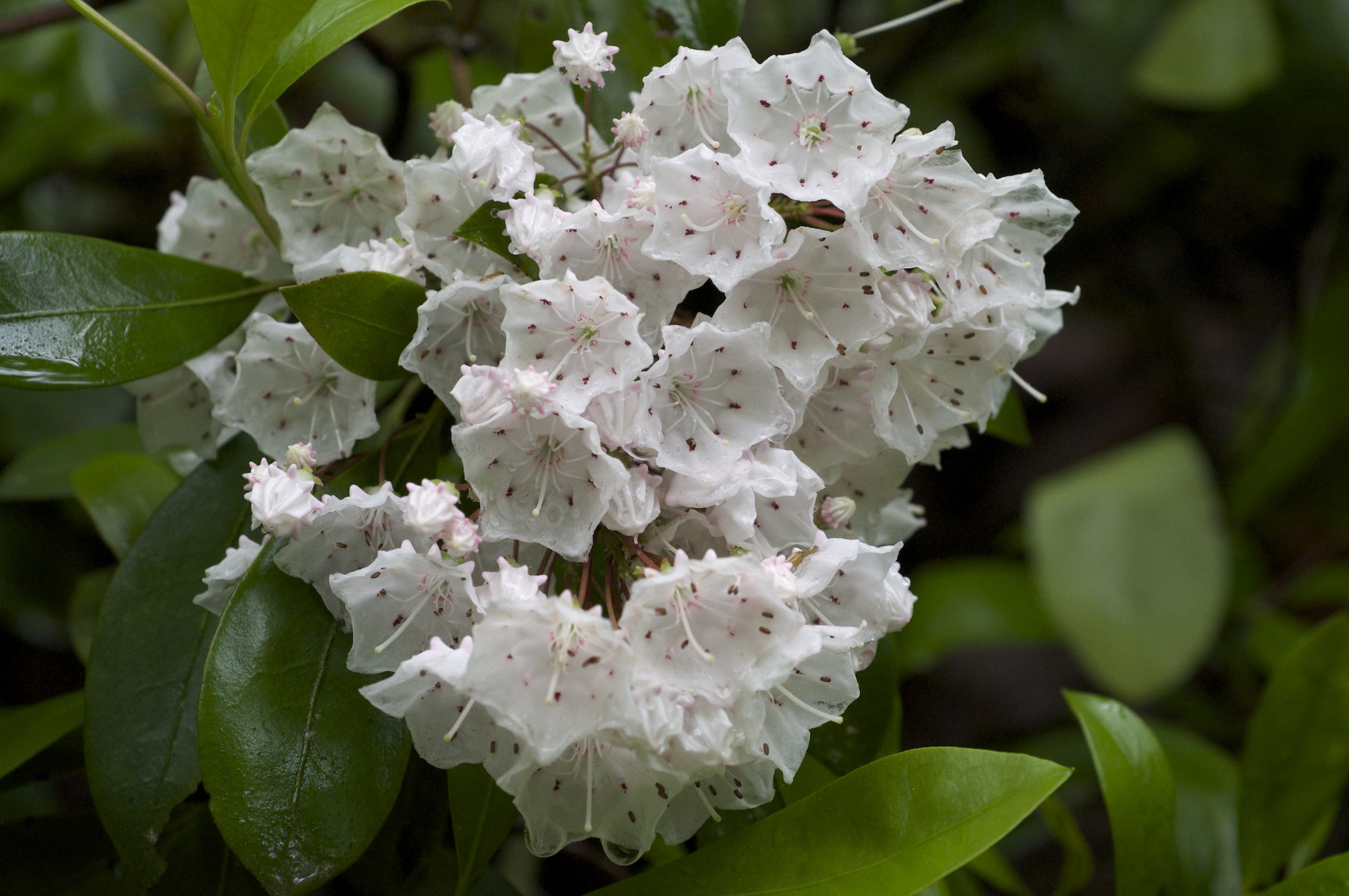
- Kalmia latifolia

Scientific classification
- Kingdom: Plantae
- Clade: Embryophytes
- Clade: Tracheophytes
- Clade: Angiosperms
- Clade: Eudicots
- Clade: Asterids
- Order: Ericales
- Family: Ericaceae
- Subfamily: Ericoideae
- Tribe: Phyllodoceae
- Genus: Kalmia; L.

Species
- See text

Synonyms
- Loiseleuria Desv.

= Kalmia =

Genus of flowering plants in the heath family

Kalmia is a genus of about ten species of evergreen shrubs from 0.2–5 m tall, in the family Ericaceae (heath). They are native to North America (mainly in the eastern half of the continent) and Cuba. They grow in acidic soils, with different species in wet acid bog habitats (K. angustifolia, K. polifolia) and dry, sandy soils (K. ericoides, K. latifolia).

Kalmia was named by Linnaeus to honour his friend the botanist Pehr Kalm, who collected it in eastern North America during the mid-18th century. Earlier, Mark Catesby saw it during his travels in Carolina, and after his return to England in 1726, imported seeds. He described it, a costly rarity, in his Natural History of Carolina, as Chamaedaphne foliis tini, that is to say "with leaves like the Laurustinus"; the botanist and plant-collector Peter Collinson, who had begged some of the shrub from his correspondent John Custis in Virginia, wrote, when his plants flowered, that "I Really Think it exceeds the Laurus Tinus."

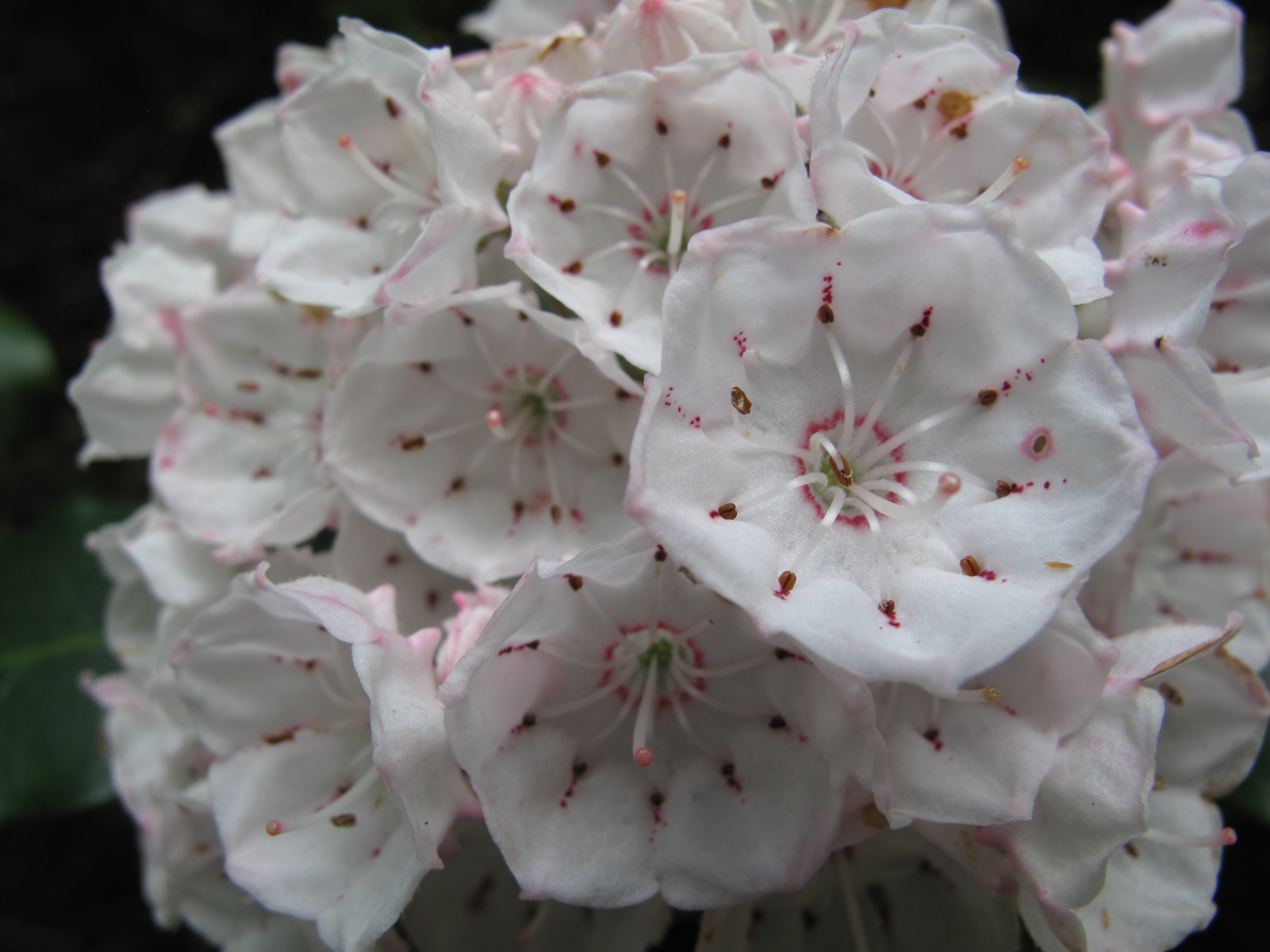
Mountain laurel blooms showing the conjoined petals

The leaves are 2–12 cm long and simple lanceolate. The flowers are white, pink or purple, in corymbs of 10–50, reminiscent of Rhododendron flowers but flatter, with a star-like calyx of five conjoined petals; each flower is 1–3 cm diameter. The fruit is a five-lobed capsule, which splits to release the numerous small seeds.

The foliage contains grayanotoxins, a group of closely related neurotoxins named after Leucothoe grayana, native to Japan, so it is toxic if eaten, with sheep being particularly prone to poisoning, hence the name lambkill used for some of the species. Other names for Kalmia, particularly Kalmia angustifolia, are sheep-laurel, lamb-kill, calf-kill, kill-kid, and sheep-poison, which may be written with or without the hyphen. (See species list below.) "Kid" here refers to a young goat, not a human child, but the foliage and twigs are toxic to humans as well.

It has also been called spoonwood because Kalm was told by Dutch settlers of North America that Native Americans made spoons from the wood. Given its toxicity, this may be folklore rather than scientific fact.

Kalmias are popular garden shrubs, grown for their decorative flowers. They should not be planted where they are accessible to livestock due to the toxicity.

Kalmia species are used as food plants by the larvae of some lepidopteran species including Coleophora kalmiella which feeds exclusively on Kalmia.

== Species ==
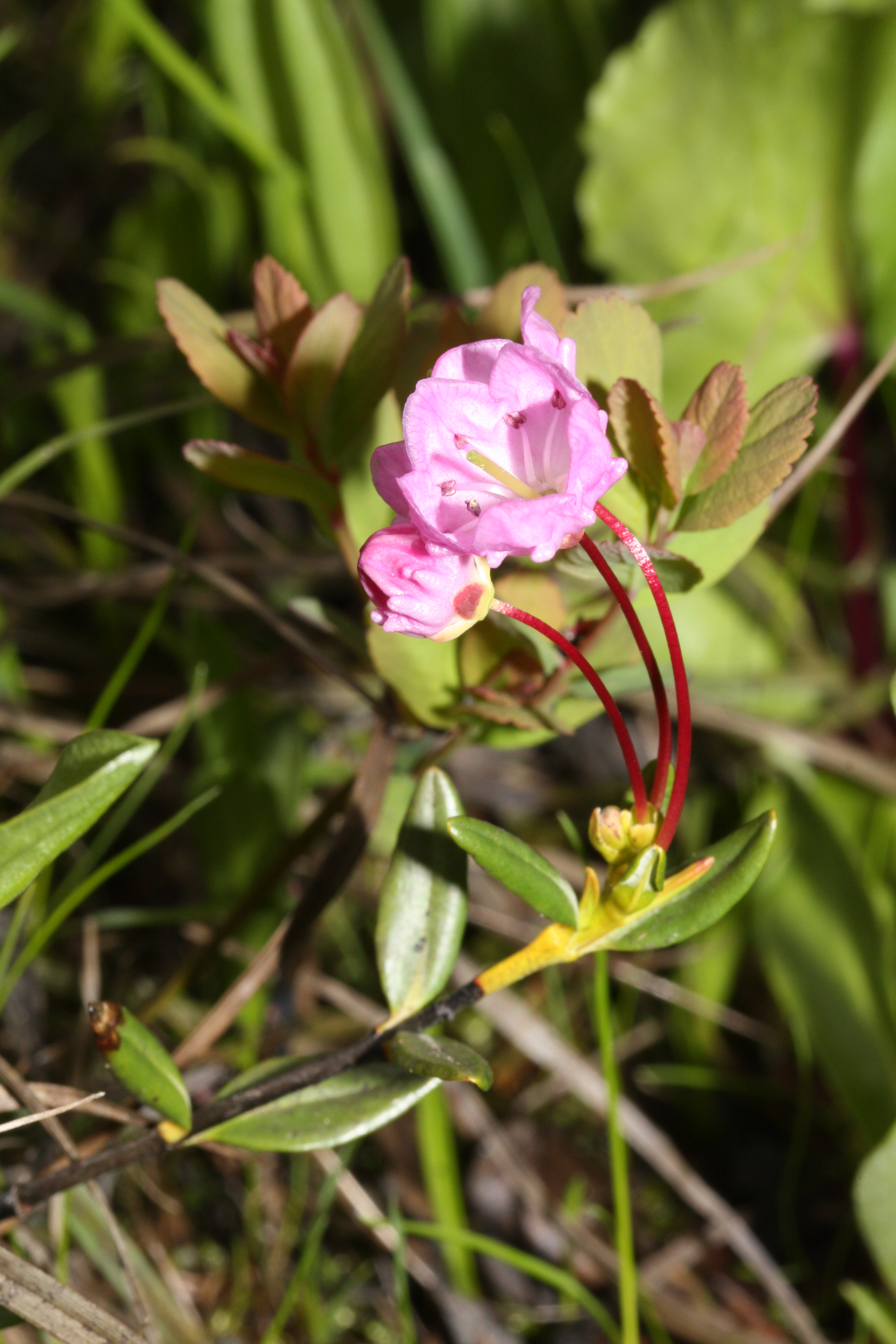
Kalmia microphylla

Species and subspecies listed by Plants of the World Online:

- Kalmia angustifolia L. – Sheep-laurel, lambkill
  - Kalmia angustifolia subsp. carolina (Small) A.Haines – Carolina mountain-laurel
- Kalmia buxifolia (P.J. Bergius) Gift & Kron – Sandmyrtle
- Kalmia cuneata Michx. – Whitewicky
- Kalmia ericoides C.Wright ex Griseb. – Cuban kalmia
- Kalmia hirsuta Walter – Hairy mountain-laurel
- Kalmia latifolia L. – Mountain laurel
- Kalmia microphylla (Hook.) A.Heller – Alpine laurel, alpine bog-laurel, alpine mountain-laurel
  - Kalmia microphylla subsp. occidentalis (Small) Roy L.Taylor & MacBryde
- Kalmia polifolia Wangenh. – Bog kalmia, bog-laurel
- Kalmia procumbens (L.) Gift, Kron & P.F.Stevens ex Galasso, Banfi & F.Conti

Kalmia procumbens was treated as the only species in the genus Loiseleuria in older floras. The related Kalmiopsis leachiana and K. fragrans are rare shrubs endemic to southwest Oregon.

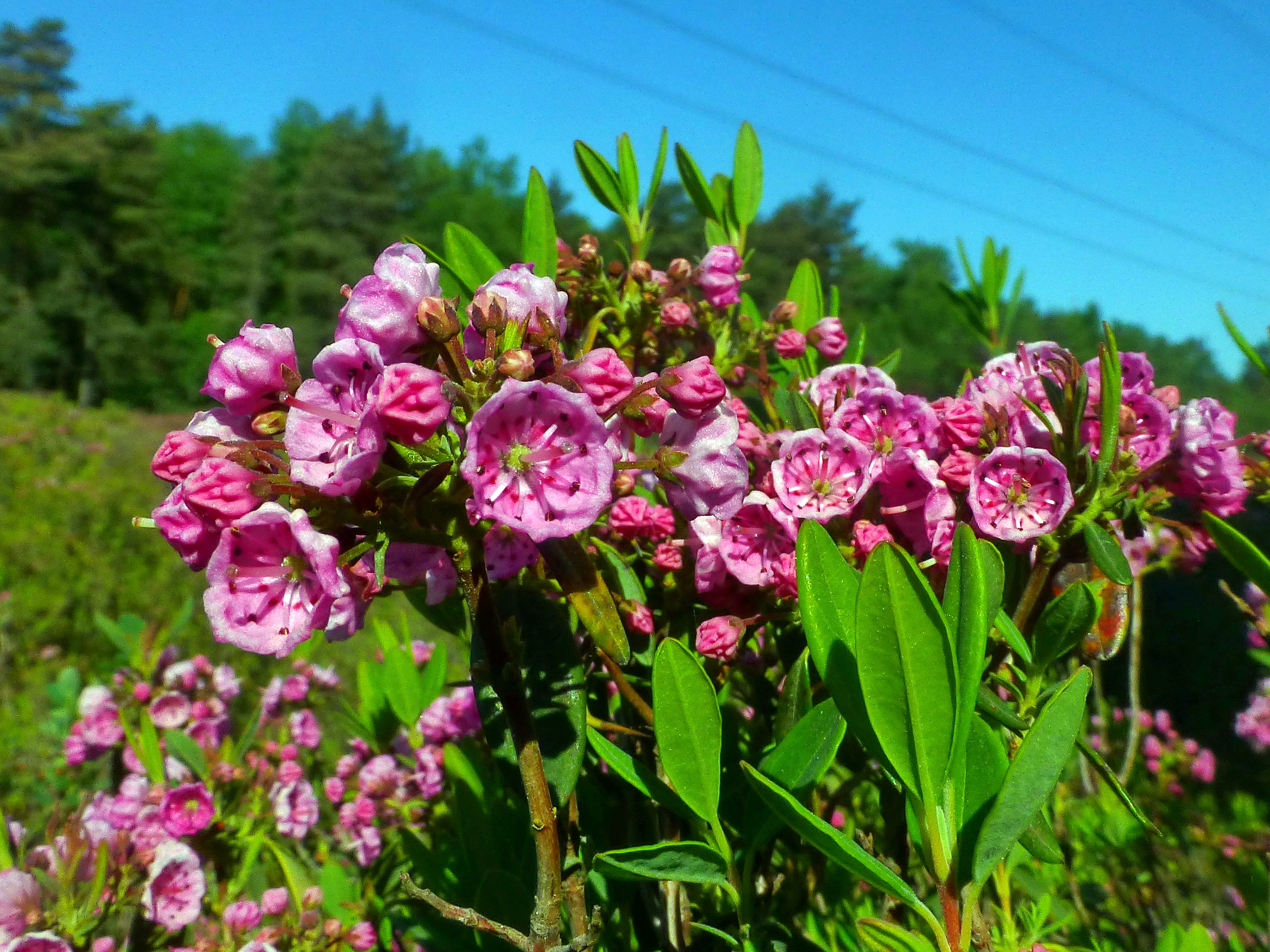
Kalmia angustifolia

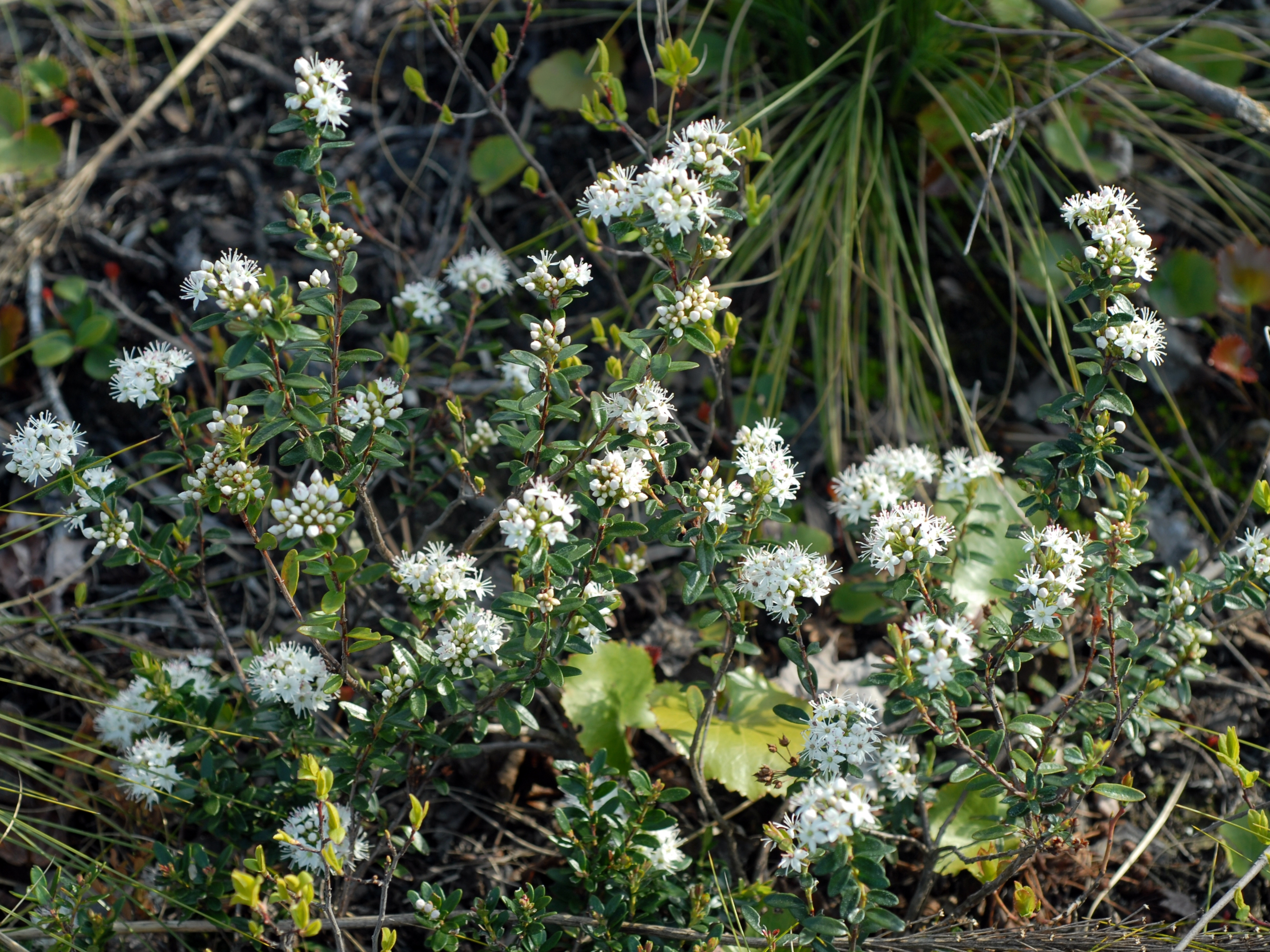
Kalmia buxifolia

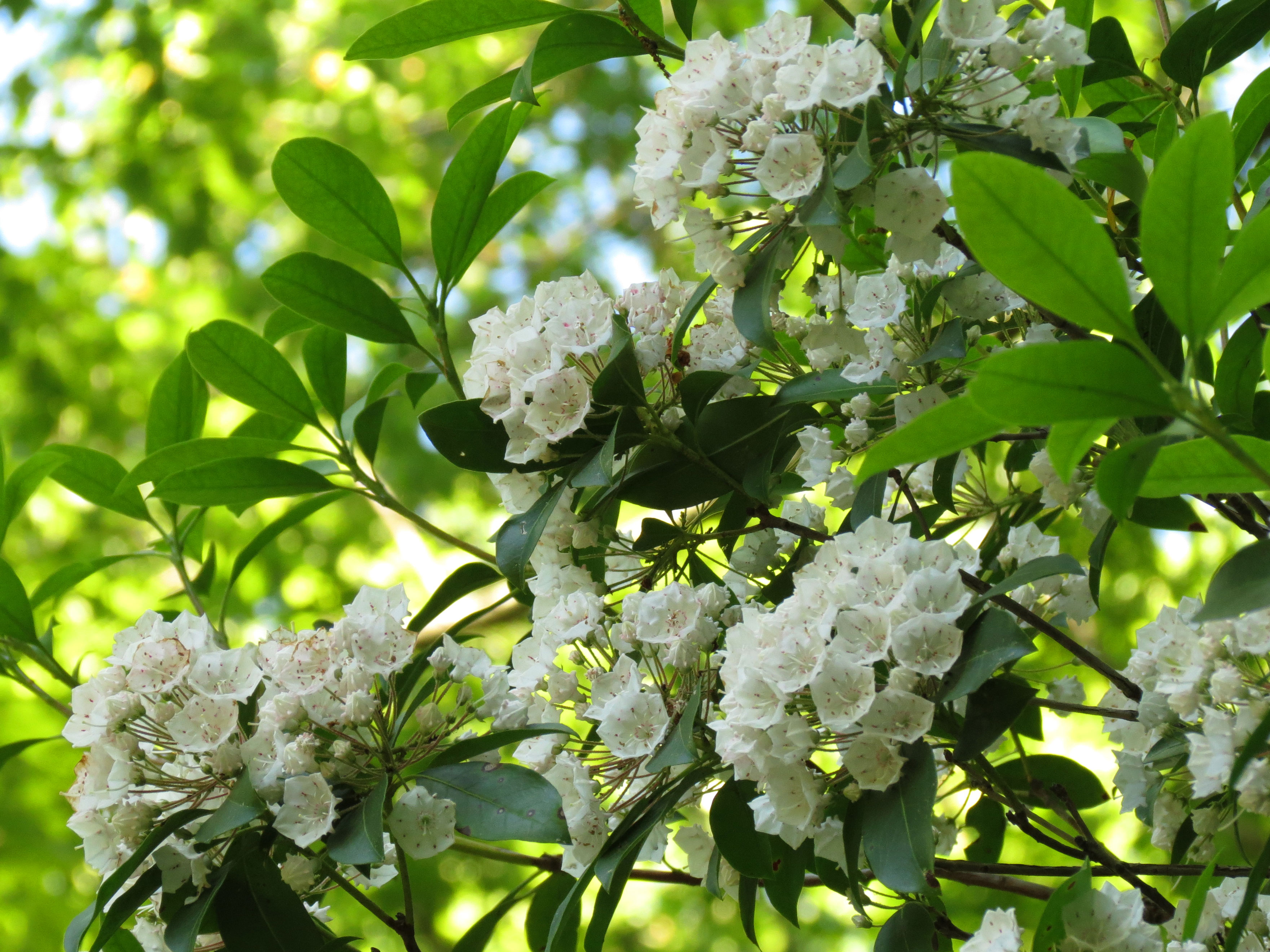
Kalmia latifolia

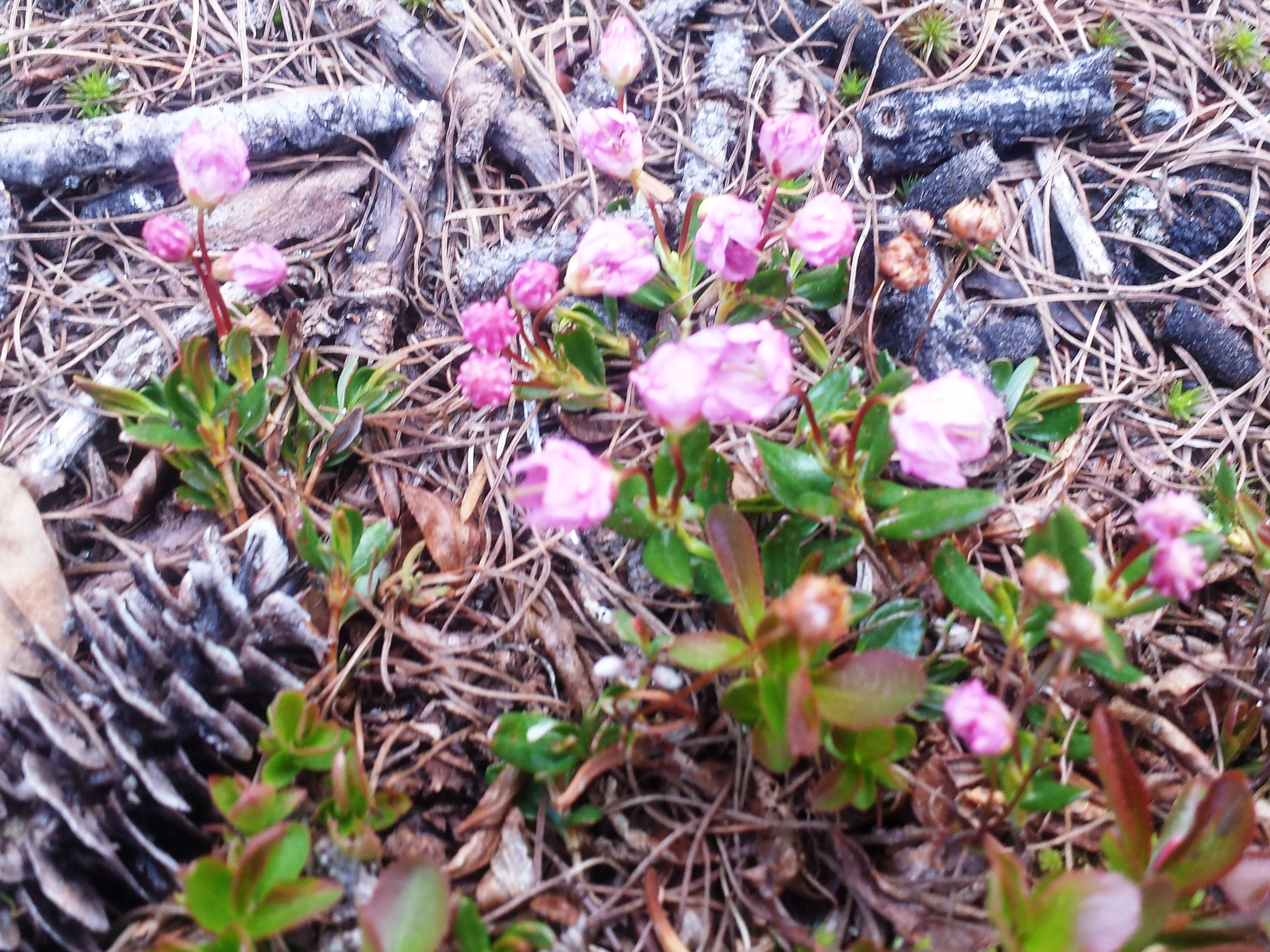
Kalmia microphylla

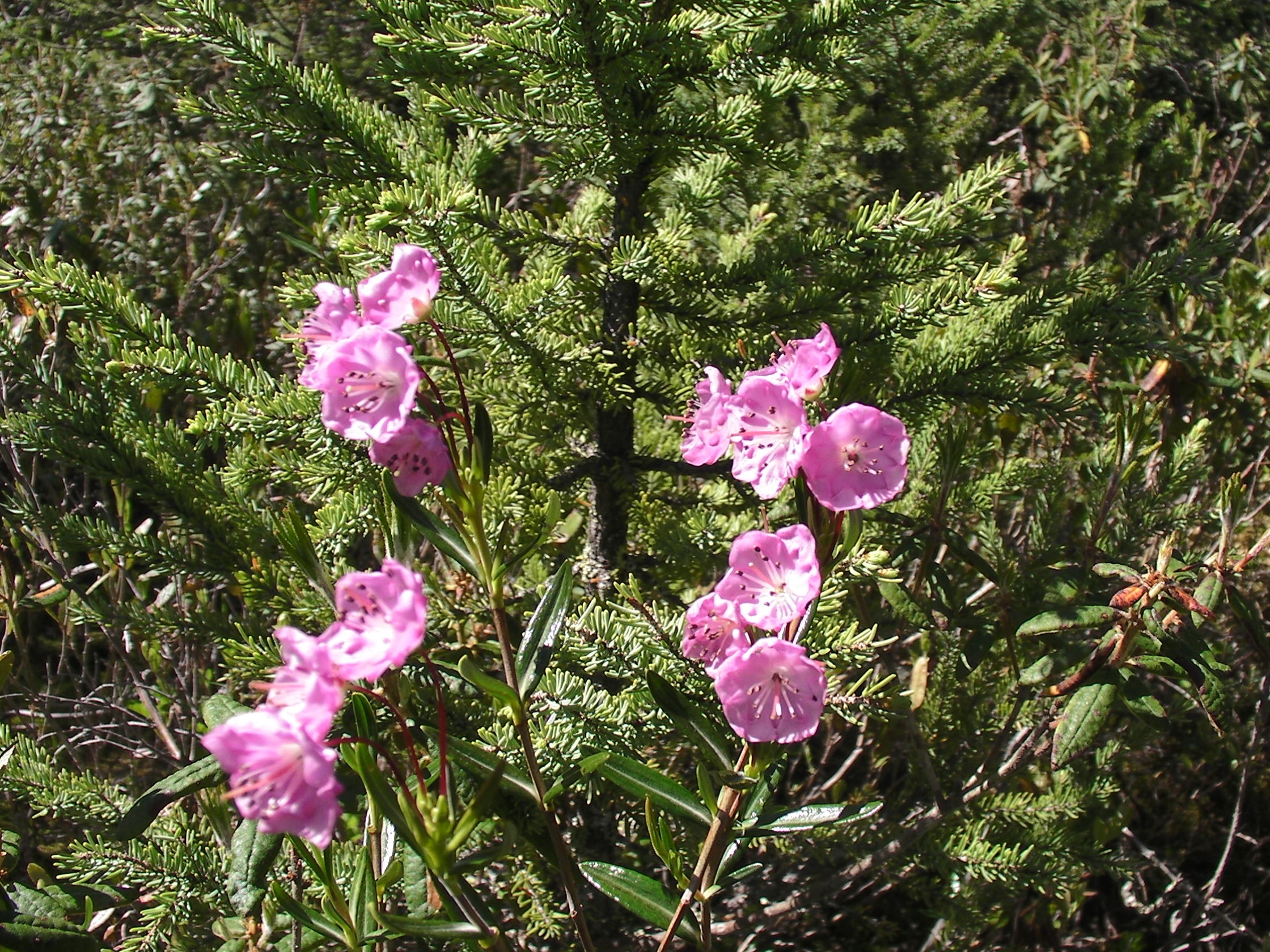
Kalmia polifolia

== Fossil record ==
Fossil leaves of †Kalmia saxonica have been described from the Lower Miocene of Brandis, Germany and Bełchatów, Poland, †'Kalmia marcodurensis have been described from the Lower Miocene of Bitterfeld, Germany. In the Late Tertiary Kalmia was associated with coal-forming vegetation occurring as a component of the vegetation of bush swamps together with Cyrilla and other shrubs. Among recent species Kalmia angustifolia is most similar to †Kalmia saxonica in respect of morphology, while Kalmia latifolia has a very similar epidermal structure. These two extant species grow in the eastern part of North America from (Quebec to Florida) on acid swampy or marshy soils.

== Bibliography ==
=== Books ===
- Jaynes, Richard A., 1997: Kalmia, mountain laurel and related species, Timber Press, Portland, Oregon, U.S.A.
- Huebbers, Karl-Heinz and Westhoff, Julia,2020 : Fascynujące kalmie (Fascinating Kalmie) published by Plantin, Krakow, Poland ISBN 978-83-956964-0-4
