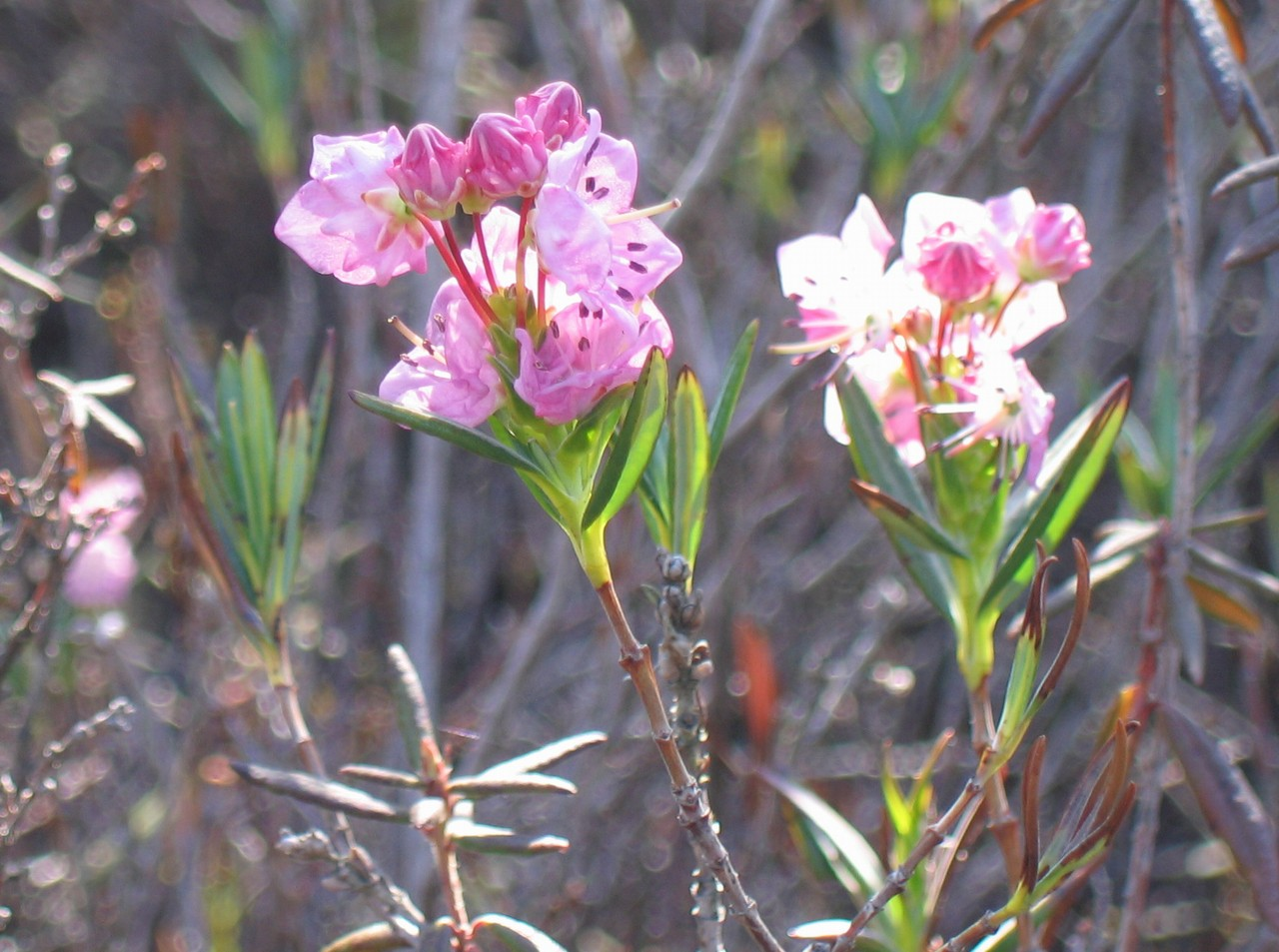

Conservation status
- Least Concern (IUCN 3.1)

Scientific classification
- Kingdom: Plantae
- Clade: Embryophytes
- Clade: Tracheophytes
- Clade: Spermatophytes
- Clade: Angiosperms
- Clade: Eudicots
- Clade: Asterids
- Order: Ericales
- Family: Ericaceae
- Genus: Kalmia
- Species: K. polifolia

Binomial name
- Kalmia polifolia Wangenh.

Synonyms Chamaedaphne glauca
- Kalmia glauca

= Kalmia polifolia =

Species of shrub

Kalmia polifolia, previously known as Kalmia glauca and commonly called bog laurel, swamp laurel, or pale laurel, is a perennial evergreen shrub of cold acidic bogs, in the family Ericaceae. It is native to north-eastern North America, from Newfoundland to Hudson Bay southwards.

== Etymology ==
The genus 'Kalmia' is named after Pehr Kalm, a Swedish-Finn botanist, who was a student of Linnaeus. The species name, 'polifolia', is Latin for 'pole-leaves' or 'pole-petals'.

The former species name, 'glauca', is Latin for gleaming or gray, a word ultimately derived from the Ancient Greek 'γλαυκός', meaning blue-green or blue-gray.

== History ==
The plant was first described by Friedrich Adam Julius von Wangenheim, a German botanist.

== Distribution and habitat ==
Kalmia polifolia is common throughout Northern North America, thriving along the Eastern American states and in Montana, as well as in every Canadian province except in British Columbia, although spottings have been reported of Kalmia polifolia at Rhododenron Lake, located near Vancouver Island. Within Canada, Kalmia polifolia is very commonly found in east Nova Scotia where bog conditions are more frequent. Kalmia polifolia has also been spotted in a bog in Surrey, England.

== Description ==
On foggy days its nearly cupped blossoms are filled with dew. The anthers on some are bent back and held by their tips in pits in the petals. When an insect disturbs the anthers they whip up, spraying the intruder with pollen

— John A. Murray, The Mountain Reader

Kalmia polifolia flowers in April and is pollinated by bees. Bees, however, after pollinating this plant, produce a poison honey. Its seeds ripen in September. These seeds are five-parted, round, and woody.

Kalmia polifolia can grow to be two feet tall. Its leaves are arranged oppositely upon its branch and grow to be an inch to an inch and a half in length and tend to be waxy with an entire and revolute margin. Below each leaf base there are ridges, where it appears as though a part of the leaf is curled around the circumference of the stem. This is especially noticeable lower on the plant.

The base of the petiole is pressed against the stem as its flowers cluster in a single terminal bunch, which appears to be pink or purple in colour; the near cup-shaped flower spans about three-eighths of an inch in diameter.

== Uses ==
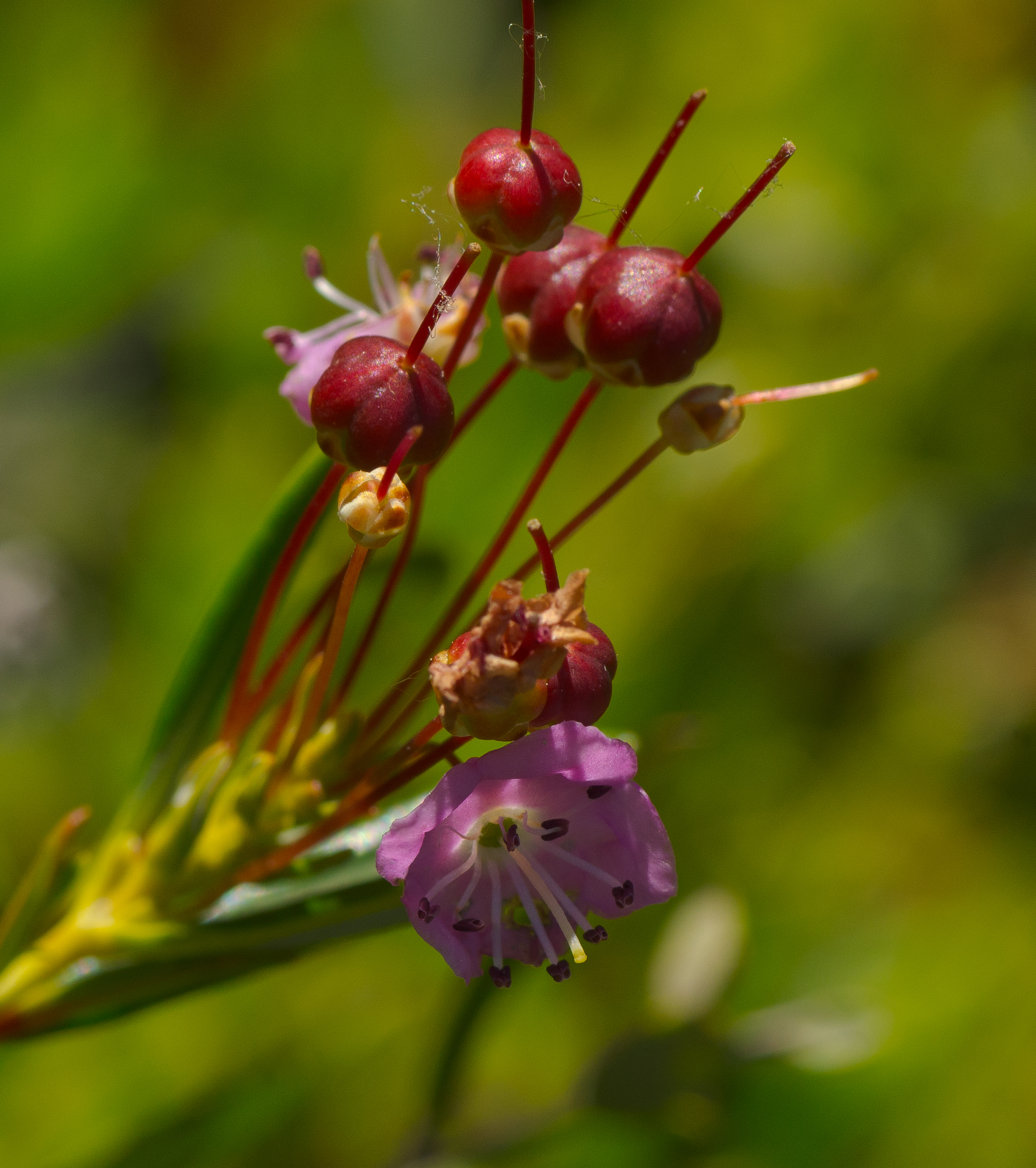
The near cup-shaped flower spans about three-eighths of an inch in diameter.

=== As medicine ===
Kalmia polifolia can be used topically for skin wounds, disease, and inflammation, while internal uses may address bleeding and diarrhoea.

=== As poison ===
Every part of Kalmia polifolia is highly toxic and poisonous to animals and persons. Although related to Kalmia angustifolia (lambkill), it is less toxic.

Certain indigenous groups have used the toxicity of the plant's leaves to commit suicide.

According to Alaback et al., Kalmia polifolia contains a grayanotoxin, which when ingested lowers blood pressure, and may cause respiratory problems, dizziness, vomiting, or diarrhea. According to Lewis and Elvin-Lewis, the active compounds within Kalmia polifolia include andromedotoxin and arbutin. These compounds cause a slowing of pulse, a lowering of blood pressure, progressive paralysis and death. Kalmia polifolia has poisoned cattle, goats and sheep. For poisoning to occur, the animal must consume 0.3% of its body weight, while a dosage of 2% of an would cause severe sickness.

Symptoms for affected goats include depression, nausea, salivation, vomiting, and grating of teeth.

Symptoms for affected sheep include depression, staggering, nausea, recubency, salivation, and vomiting.

=== As food ===
While caribou do not have specialized food habits, they can eat most plants - preferring fungi, green leaves of deciduous shrubs, and new spring growth of sedges. They often eat Kalmia polifolia in the spring and summer; the plant comprises 11% of their dietary dry-matter protein.

=== For aesthetics ===
Kalmia polifolia was planted in Montreal's First Nation Garden, among another 300 species planted.

== Gallery ==
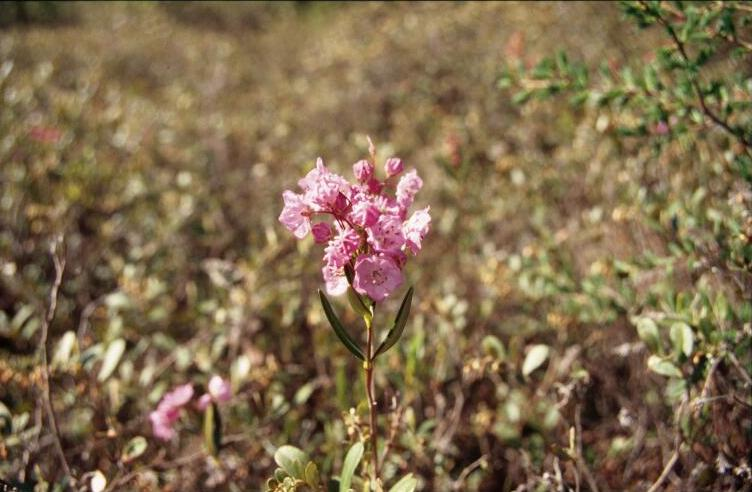

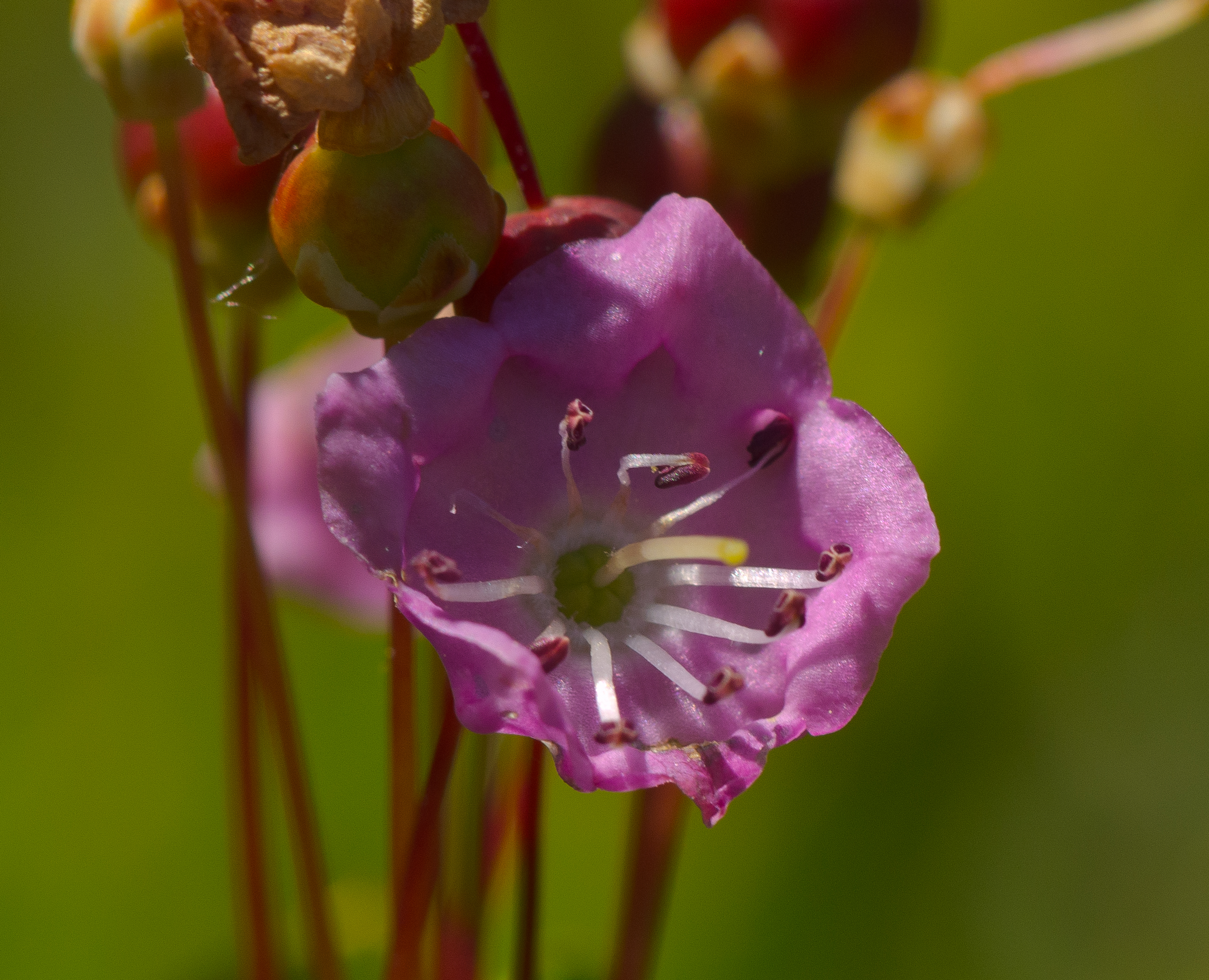

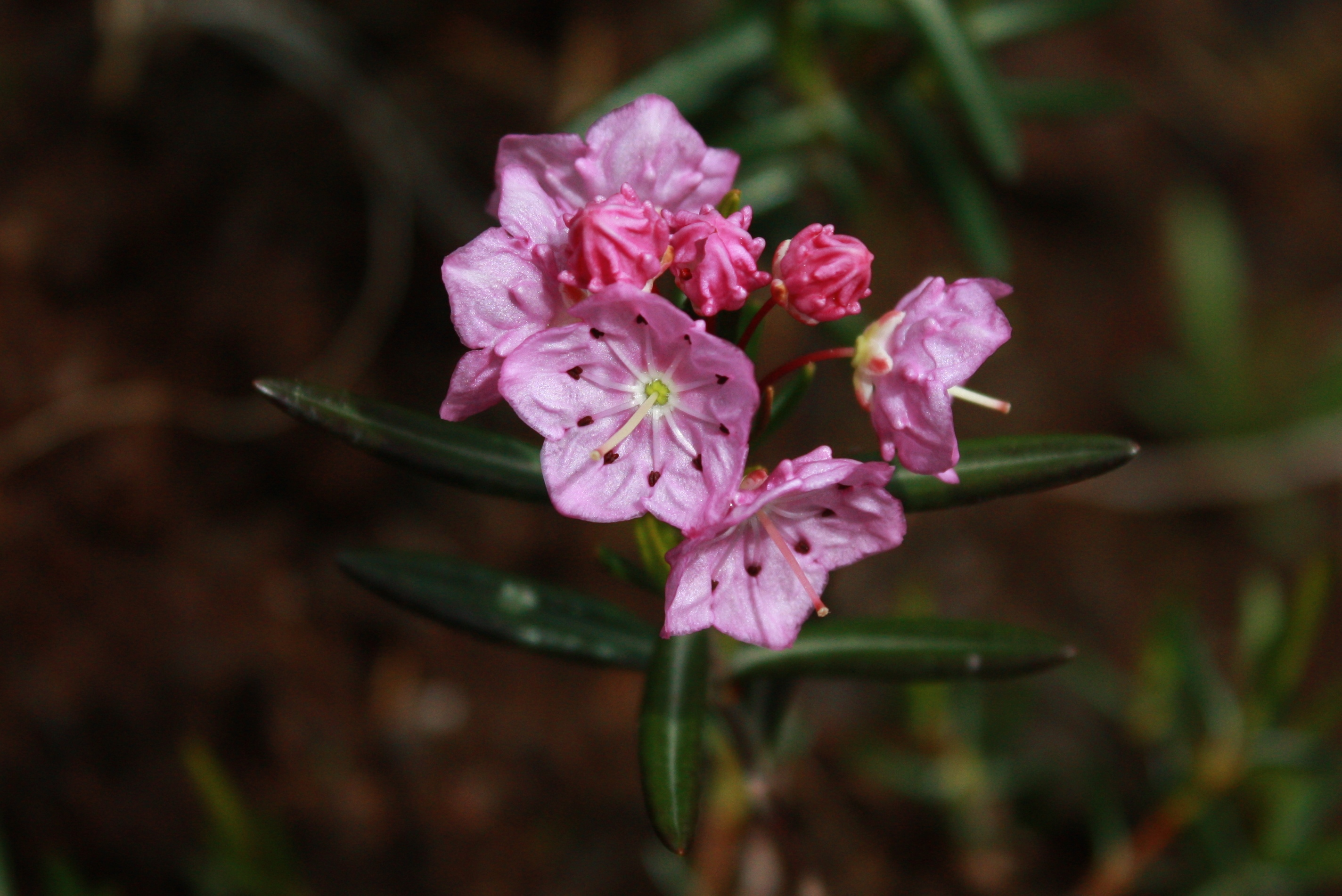

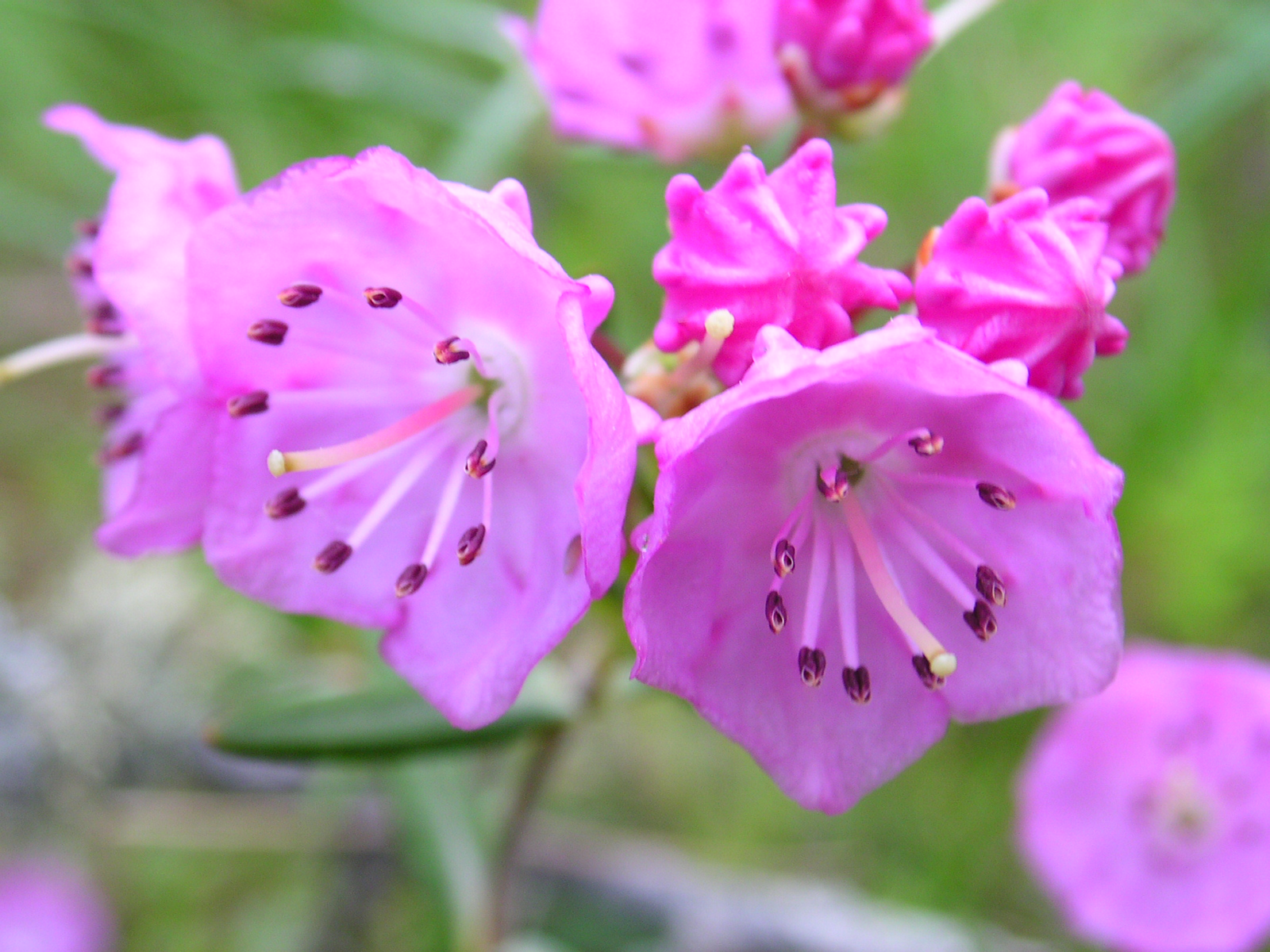

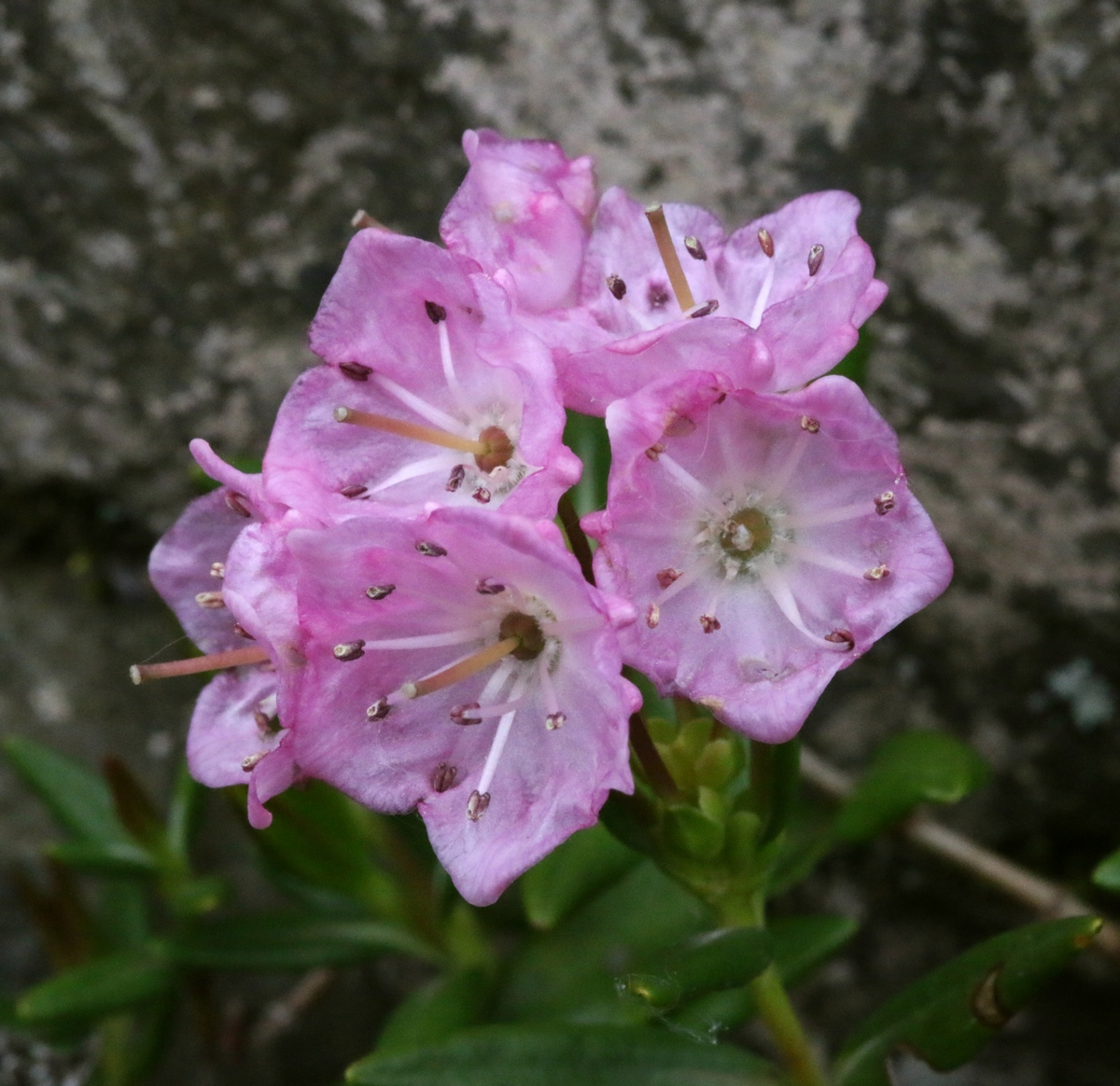

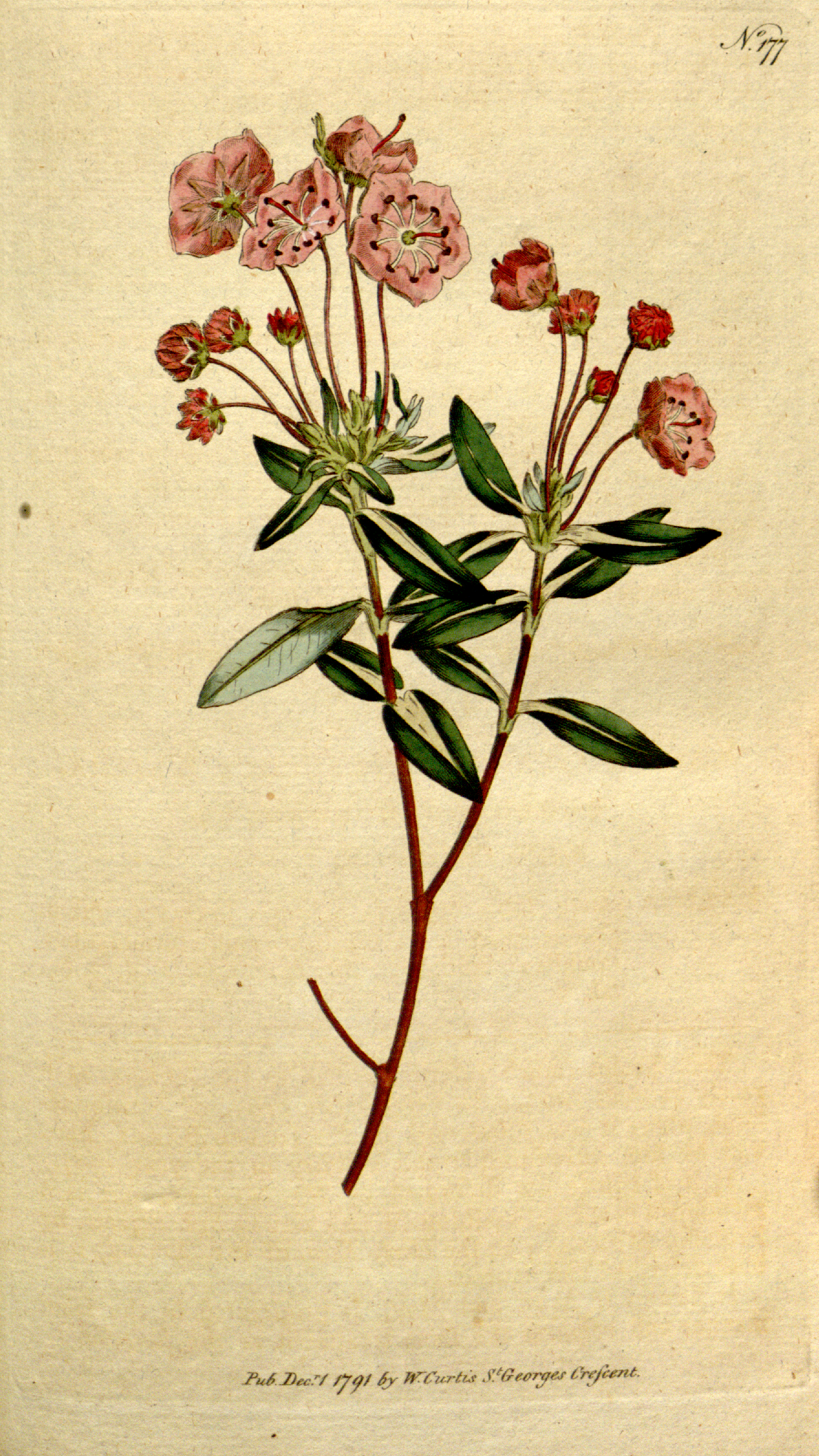
Kalmia polifolia (1792)

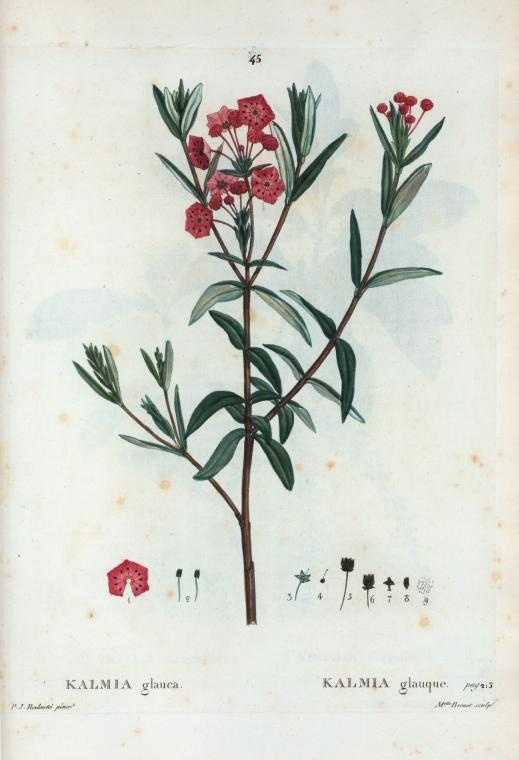
Kalmia glauca, by Pierre-Joseph Redouté (1759–1840)

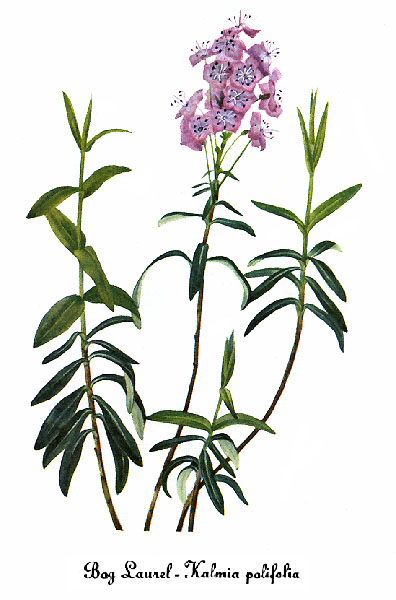
Kalmia polifolia, by Mary Vaux Walcott (1860–1940)
