= Spoonwood =

Spoonwood is a common name for two plants:

- Kalmia latifolia, a North American plant known as mountain laurel and numerous other names emphasizing its poisonous nature, such as lambkill, kill-kid, and calf-kill.
- Trichilia havanensis, a Caribbean softwood plant also known as palo de cuchara and limoncillo (not to be confused with the hardwood plant also known as limoncillo from the citrus family).
