= Grayanotoxin =

Group of chemical compounds

Grayanotoxins are a group of closely related neurotoxins named after Leucothoe grayana, a plant native to Japan and named for 19th-century American botanist Asa Gray. Grayanotoxin I (grayanotoxane-3,5,6,10,14,16-hexol 14-acetate) is also known as andromedotoxin, acetylandromedol, rhodotoxin and asebotoxin. Grayanotoxins are produced by Rhododendron species and other plants in the family Ericaceae. Honey that contains grayanotoxins is commonly referred to as "mad honey".

Consumption of the plant or any of its secondary products, including mad honey, can cause a rare poisonous reaction called grayanotoxin poisoning, mad honey disease, honey intoxication, or rhododendron poisoning. It is most frequently produced and consumed in regions of Turkey and Nepal as a recreational drug and traditional medicine.

== Origin ==
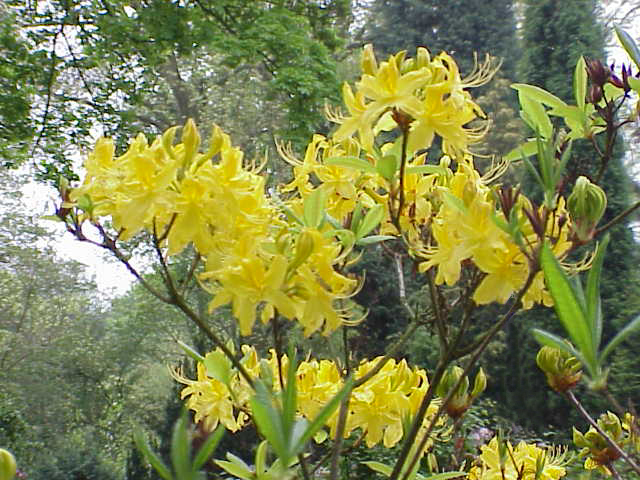
Rhododendron luteum

Grayanotoxins are produced by plants in the family Ericaceae, specifically members of the genera Agarista, Craibiodendron, Kalmia, Leucothoe, Lyonia, Pieris and Rhododendron. The genus Rhododendron alone encompasses over 750 species that grow around the world in parts of Europe, North America, Japan, India, Bhutan, Nepal and Turkey. They can grow at a variety of altitudes, ranging from sea level to more than 3 kilometres (9,800 ft). While many of these species contain grayanotoxins, only a few contain significant levels. Species with high concentrations of grayanotoxins, such as R. ponticum and R. luteum, are most commonly found in regions of Turkey bordering the Black Sea, and in Nepal.

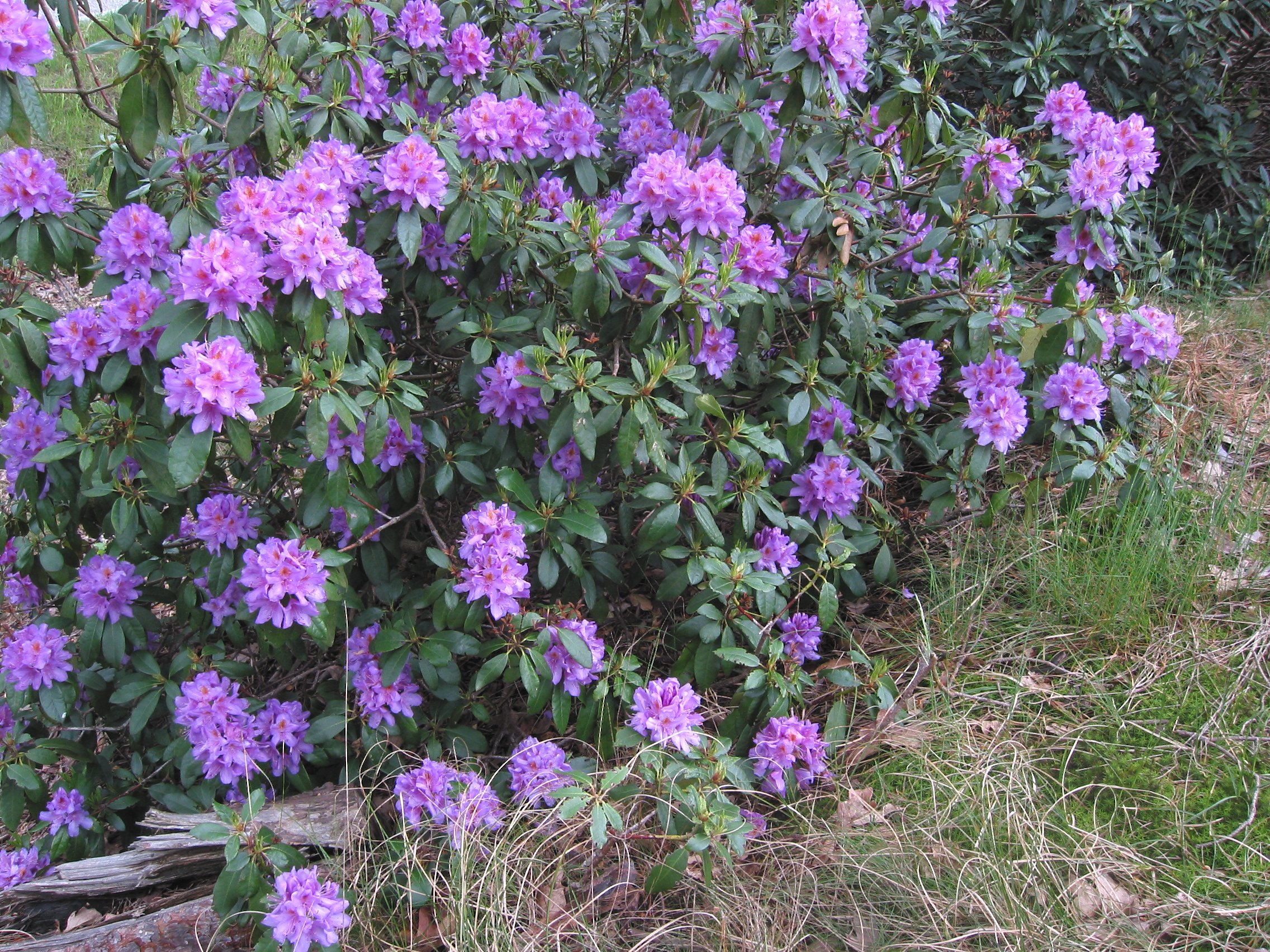
Rhododendron ponticum

Nearly all parts of grayanotoxin-producing rhododendrons contain the molecule, including the stem, leaves, flower, pollen and nectar. Grayanotoxins can also be found in secondary plant products, such as honey, labrador tea, cigarettes, and herbal medicines.

== Chemical structure ==

Grayanotoxin	R^{1}	R^{2}	R^{3}
Grayanotoxin I	OH	CH_{3}	Ac
Grayanotoxin II	CH_{2}		H
Grayanotoxin III	OH	CH_{3}	H
Grayanotoxin IV	CH_{2}		Ac

Grayanotoxins are low molecular weight hydrophobic compounds. They are structurally characterized as polyhydroxylated cyclic diterpenes. The base structure is a 5/7/6/5 ring system that does not contain nitrogen. More than 25 grayanotoxin isoforms have been identified from Rhododendron species, but grayanotoxin I and III are thought to be the principal toxic isoforms. Different Rhododendron species contain multiple different grayanotoxin isoforms, contributing to differences in plant toxicity.

== Mechanism of action ==
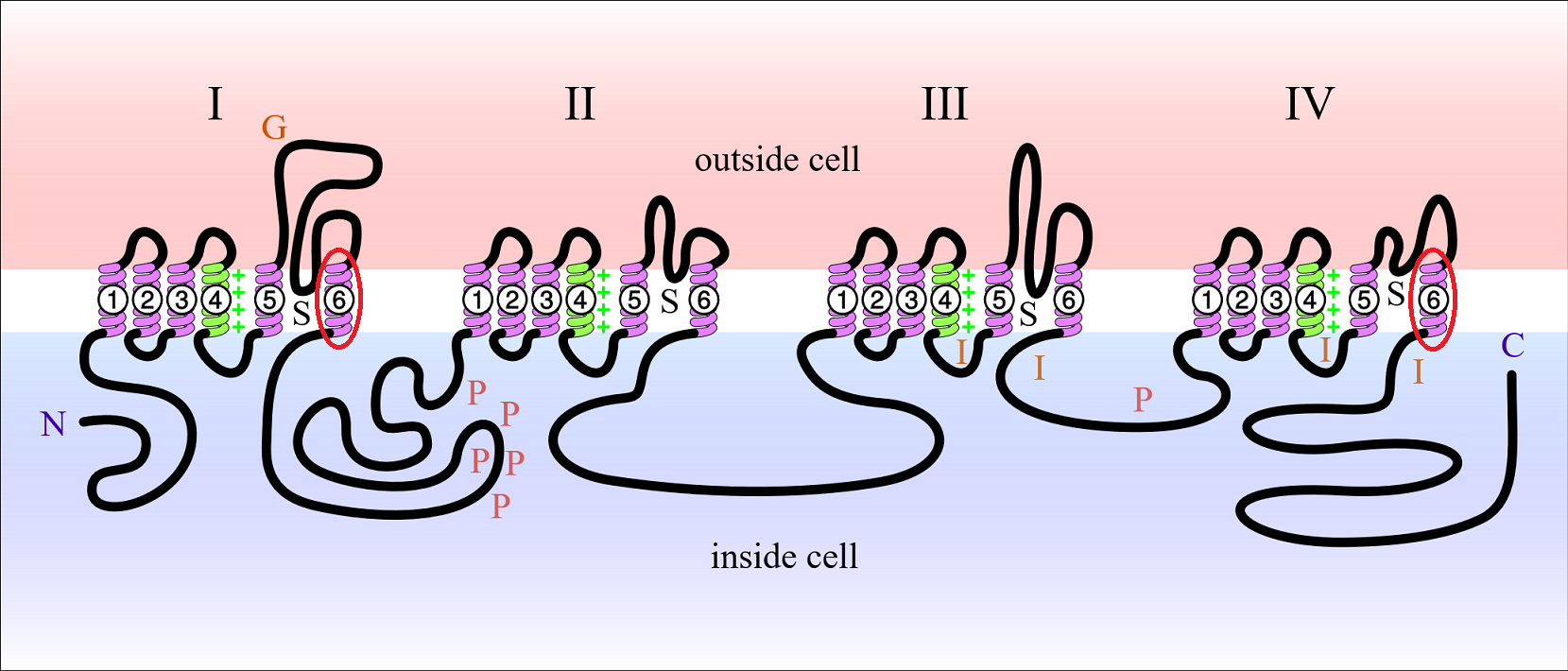
Voltage-gated sodium channel with group II receptor site domains highlighted in red.

The toxicity of grayanotoxin is derived from its ability to interfere with voltage-gated sodium channels located in the cell membrane of neurons. The Na_{v}1.x channels consist of four homologous domains (I-IV), each containing six transmembrane alpha-helical segments (S1-S6). Grayanotoxin has a binding affinity (IC_{50}) of approximately 10 μM and binds the group II receptor site located on segment 6 of domains I and IV (IS6 and IVS6). Other toxins that bind to this region include the alkaloids veratridine, batrachotoxin and aconitine.

Experiments using squid axonal membranes indicate that sodium channel binding likely occurs on the internal face of the neuron. Additionally, grayanotoxin only binds to the activated conformation of sodium channels. Normally, voltage gated sodium channels are activated (opened) only when the cell membrane potential reaches a specific threshold voltage. This activated conformation allows for an influx of sodium ions resulting in cell depolarization, followed by the firing of an action potential. At the peak of the action potential, voltage-gated sodium channels are quickly inactivated and are only reset once the cell has repolarized to resting potential. When grayanotoxin is present, binding induces further conformational changes that prevent sodium channel inactivation and lead to a prolonged depolarization. Owing to its transient ability to activate channels and increase membrane permeability to sodium ions, grayanotoxin is classified as a reversible Na_{v}1.x agonist.

== Clinical effects ==
Although mad honey is used in traditional medicine in Turkey, the majority of grayanotoxin poisoning cases occur in middle-aged males who use the honey for perceived sexual enhancement. Slowing of heart rate and lowering of blood pressure are typical effects reported in one review of cases. Dizziness, nausea, fainting, and weakness were reported as common neurological outcomes. Other early-onset symptoms may include doubled and blurred vision, hypersalivation, perspiration, and paresthesia in the extremities and around the mouth. In higher doses, symptoms can include loss of coordination, severe and progressive muscular weakness, electrocardiographic changes of bundle branch block or ST-segment elevations as seen in ischemic myocardial threat, and nodal rhythm or Wolff-Parkinson-White syndrome.

The primary mediator of this grayanotoxin pathophysiology is the paired vagus nerve (tenth cranial nerve). The vagus nerve is a major component of the parasympathetic nervous system (a branch of the autonomic nervous system) and innervates various organs including the lungs, stomach, kidney and heart. Vagal stimulation of the heart is mediated by M_{2}-subtype muscarinic acetylcholine receptors (mAChR). In severe cases of grayanotoxin poisoning, atropine – a non-specific muscarinic acetylcholine receptor antagonist – can be used to treat bradycardia and other heart rhythm malfunctions. In addition to correcting rhythm disorders, administration of fluids and vasopressors can also help treat hypotension and mitigate other symptoms.

Patients exposed to low doses of grayanotoxin typically recover within a few hours. In more severe cases, symptoms may persist for 24 hours or longer and may require medical treatment (as described above). Despite the risk from cardiac problems, grayanotoxin poisoning is rarely fatal in humans.

A 2023 risk assessment by the European Food Safety Authority derived a reference point of 15.3 μg/kg body weight for the sum of grayanotoxins I and III, based on a benchmark dose lower confidence limit (BMDL_{10}) for reduced heart rate in rats.

== Animal poisoning ==
In contrast to humans, grayanotoxin poisoning can be lethal for other animals. Nectar containing grayanotoxin can kill honeybees, though some seem to have resistance to it and can produce honey from the nectar (see below). According to a team of researchers from the UK and Ireland, worker bumblebees are not harmed and may be preferable as pollinators because they transfer more pollen. Consequently, it may be advantageous for plants to produce grayanotoxin to be pollinated by bumblebees.

== Mad honey intoxication ==
Bees that collect pollen and nectar from grayanotoxin-containing plants often produce honey that also contains grayanotoxins. This so-called "mad honey" is the most common cause of grayanotoxin poisoning in humans. Small-scale producers of mad honey typically harvest honey from a small area or single hive to produce a final product containing a significant concentration of grayanotoxin. In contrast, large-scale honey production often mixes honey gathered from different locations, diluting the concentration of any contaminated honey.

Mad honey is produced in specific world regions, notably the Black Sea region of Turkey (91% of poisoning cases in one analysis) and Nepal (5%). In Turkey, mad honey known as deli bal is used as a recreational drug and traditional medicine. It is most commonly made from the nectar of Rhododendron luteum and Rhododendron ponticum in the Caucasus region. In Nepal, this type of honey is used by the Gurung people for both its hallucinogenic properties and supposed medicinal benefits.

In the 18th century, this honey was exported to Europe to add to alcoholic drinks to give them extra potency. In modern times, it is consumed locally and exported to North America, Europe and Asia.

=== Other grayanotoxin sources ===
In addition to various Rhododendron species, mad honey can also be made from several other grayanotoxin-containing plants. Honey produced from the nectar of Andromeda polifolia contains high enough levels of grayanotoxin to cause full body paralysis and potentially fatal breathing difficulties due to diaphragm paralysis. Honey obtained from spoonwood and allied species such as sheep-laurel can also cause illness. The honey from Lestrimelitta limao also produces a similar paralyzing effect to that of the honey from A. polifolia and is also toxic to humans.

=== Historical use ===
The intoxicating effects of mad honey have been suspected for centuries, including records from Xenophon, Aristotle, Strabo, Pliny the Elder and Columella, all reporting illness from eating "maddening" honey believed to be from the pollen or nectar of Rhododendron luteum and Rhododendron ponticum. According to Xenophon's Anabasis, an invading Greek army was accidentally poisoned by harvesting and eating the local Asia Minor honey, but they all made a quick recovery without any fatalities.

== See also ==
- Incilius alvarius
- Sarpa salpa
