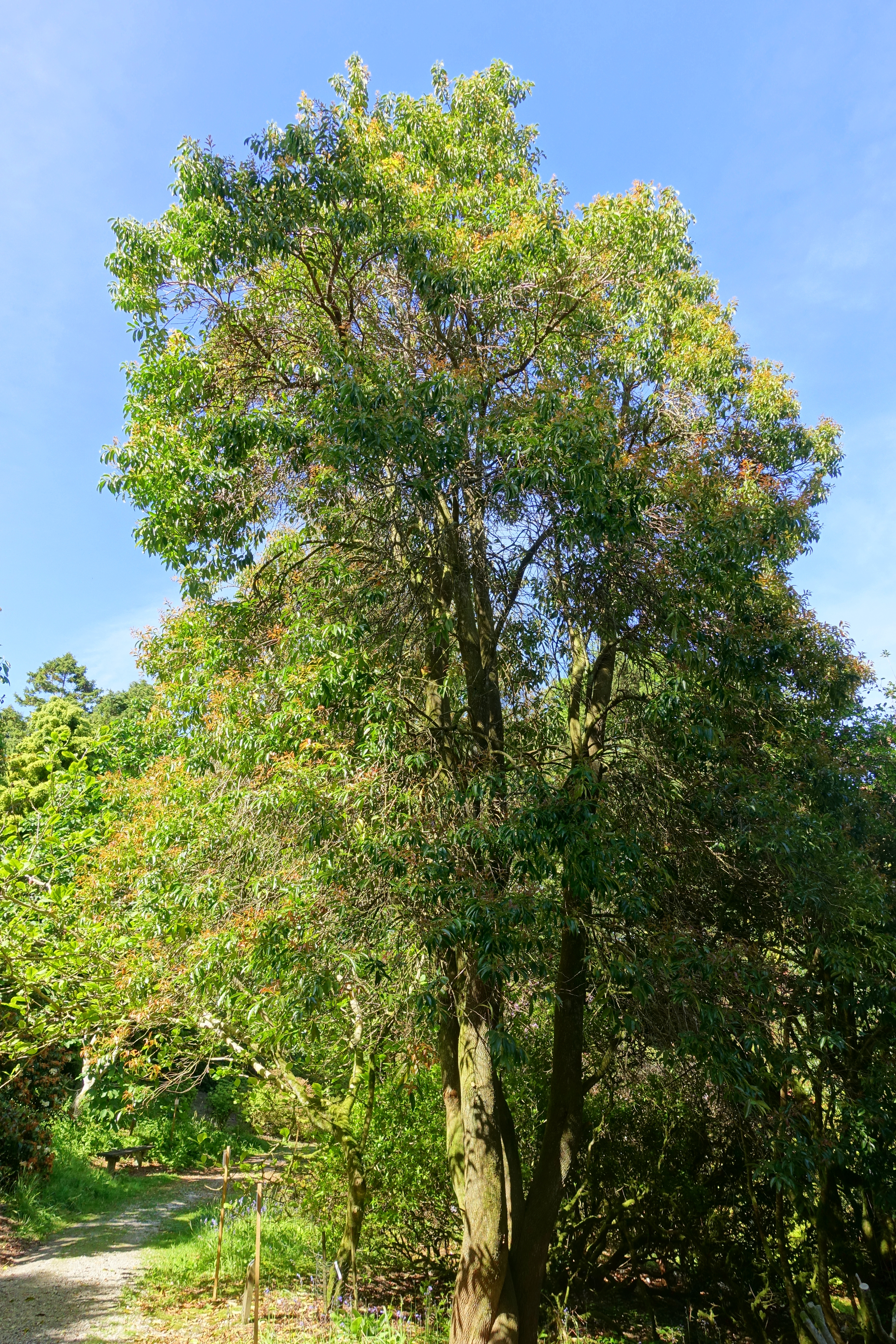

Scientific classification
- Kingdom: Plantae
- Clade: Tracheophytes
- Clade: Angiosperms
- Clade: Eudicots
- Clade: Asterids
- Order: Ericales
- Family: Ericaceae
- Genus: Craibiodendron; W.W.Sm.

= Craibiodendron =

Genus of flowering plants

Craibiodendron is a genus of flowering plants belonging to the family Ericaceae.

Its native range is Assam to Indo-China.

Species:

- Craibiodendron henryi W.W.Sm.
- Craibiodendron scleranthum (Dop) Judd
- Craibiodendron stellatum (Laness.) W.W.Sm.
- Craibiodendron vietnamense Judd
- Craibiodendron yunnanense W.W.Sm.
