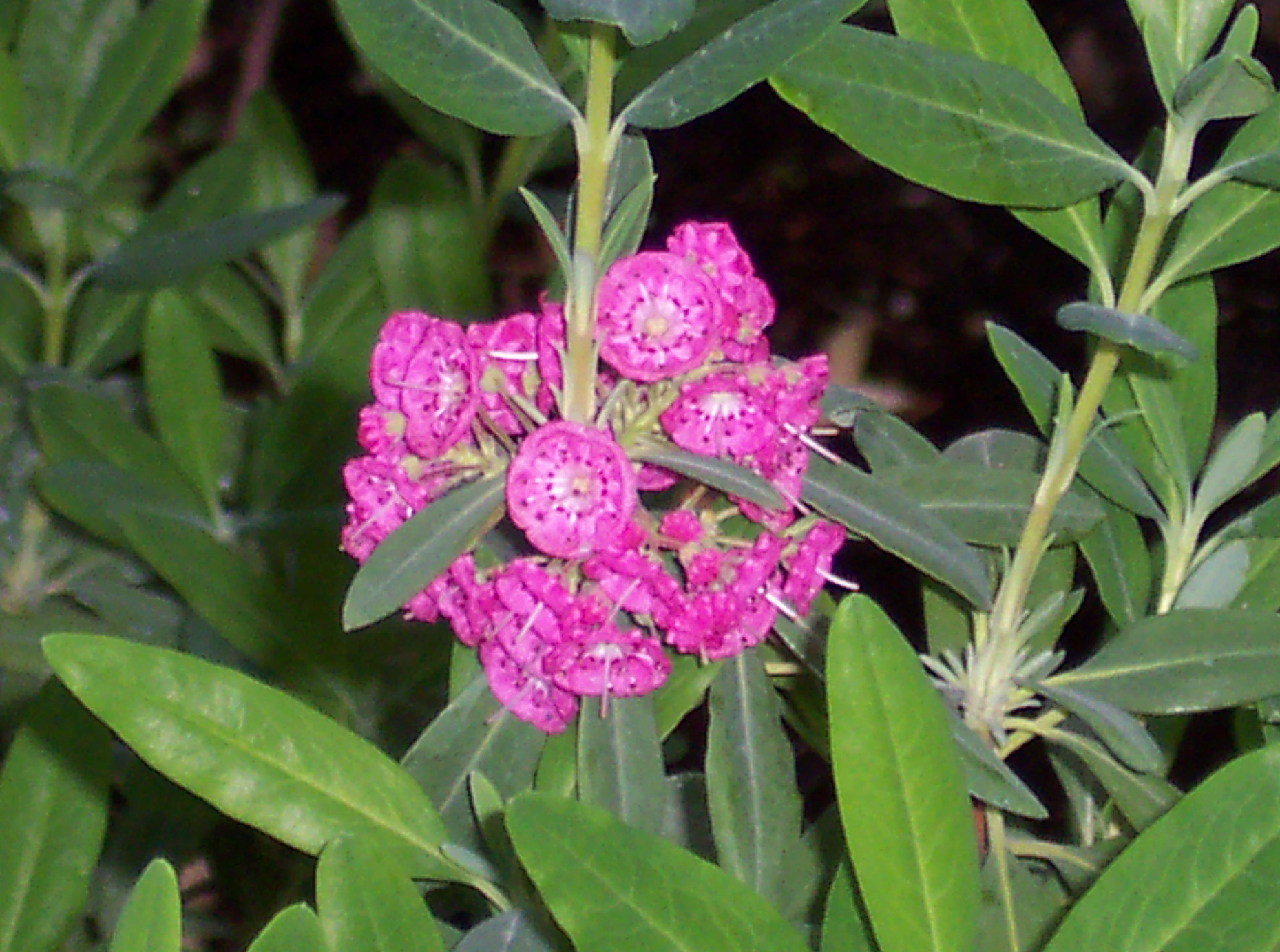

Scientific classification
- Kingdom: Plantae
- Clade: Tracheophytes
- Clade: Angiosperms
- Clade: Eudicots
- Clade: Asterids
- Order: Ericales
- Family: Ericaceae
- Genus: Kalmia
- Species: K. angustifolia

Binomial name
- Kalmia angustifolia L.

= Kalmia angustifolia =

Sheep-laurel

Species of shrub

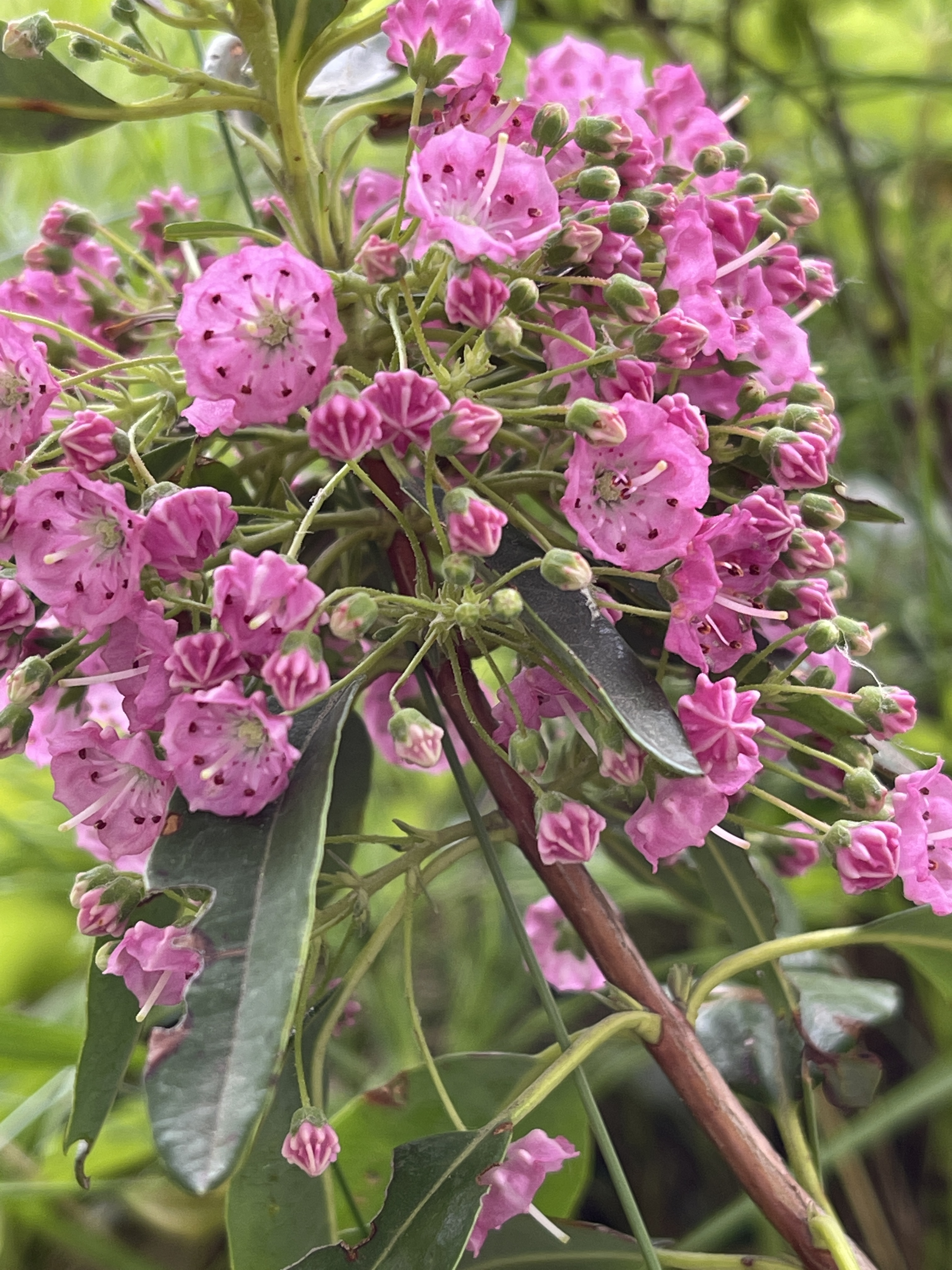
Kalmia angustifolia L. — Sheep Laurel, Lambkill, Mauricie, Quebec, Canada

Kalmia angustifolia is a flowering shrub in the family Ericaceae, commonly known by various names including sheep laurel, wicky, and dwarf laurel. Like many plant species of infertile habitats it has evergreen leaves and mycorrhizal associations with fungi.

== Description ==
The attractive, small, deep crimson-pink flowers are produced in early summer. Each has five sepals, with a corolla of five fused petals, and ten stamens fused to the corolla. They are pollinated by bumblebees and solitary bees. Each mature capsule contains about 180 seeds.

In the wild the plant may vary in height from 15–90 cm (6–35 in). New shoots arise from dormant buds on buried rhizomes. This process is stimulated by fire. The narrow evergreen leaves, pale on the underside, have a tendency to emerge from the stem in groups of three. The Latin specific epithet angustifolia means "narrow-leaved". A peculiarity of the plant is that clusters of leaves usually terminate the woody stem, for the flowers grow in whorls or in clusters below the stem apex.

Flowering April through May primarily and again but with less frequent blooms in the fall. Fruiting early autumn. Phenology can be dependent on fire presence earlier in the year.

== Taxonomy ==
Kalmia angustifolia previously included the subspecies K. angustifolia ssp. carolina, however more recent discussion has led to species status for K. carolina.

In Linnaeus' Species Plantarum, Kalmia angustifolia is described initially as having lanceolate, entire glabrous leaves and lateral flower clusters. It was distinguished from K. latifolia which was described as having ovate leaves and terminal flower clusters.

== Distribution ==
Kalmia angustifolia is distributed in eastern North America from Ontario and Quebec south to Virginia, while the southern subspecies K. angustifolia ssp. carolina grows as far south as Georgia. It grows commonly in dry habitats in the boreal forest, and is also found in drier areas of peat bogs, or pocosins. It may become dominant over large areas after fire or logging.

== Ecology ==
Kalmia angustifolia is an understory shrub common in boreal forests in eastern North America. Commonly growing in black spruce forest. One study found that under closed canopy it is mostly vegetative with few flowers whereas places where black spruce was harvested and the site was burned, K. angustifolia flowered significantly more. Clear cut harvesting of these ecosystems has led to K. angustifolia dominating cleared sites. It is described as opportunistic and re-sprouts post logging and fire, often inhibiting efforts to reinstate conifer forests.

Kalmia angustifolia contains tannins in its foliage which are an important aspect of their effect on ecosystem structure. Soil enzyme activities have been shown to be reduced by increased cover of K. angustifolia due to high tannin concentrations. Tannin production is a key characteristic which effects its competitive ability.

Like other species in the Ericaceae family, K. angustifolia has a symbiotic relationship with fungi. Ericoid mycorrhiza is a soil fungus and was named thus due to its common association with plants in this family.

== Uses ==
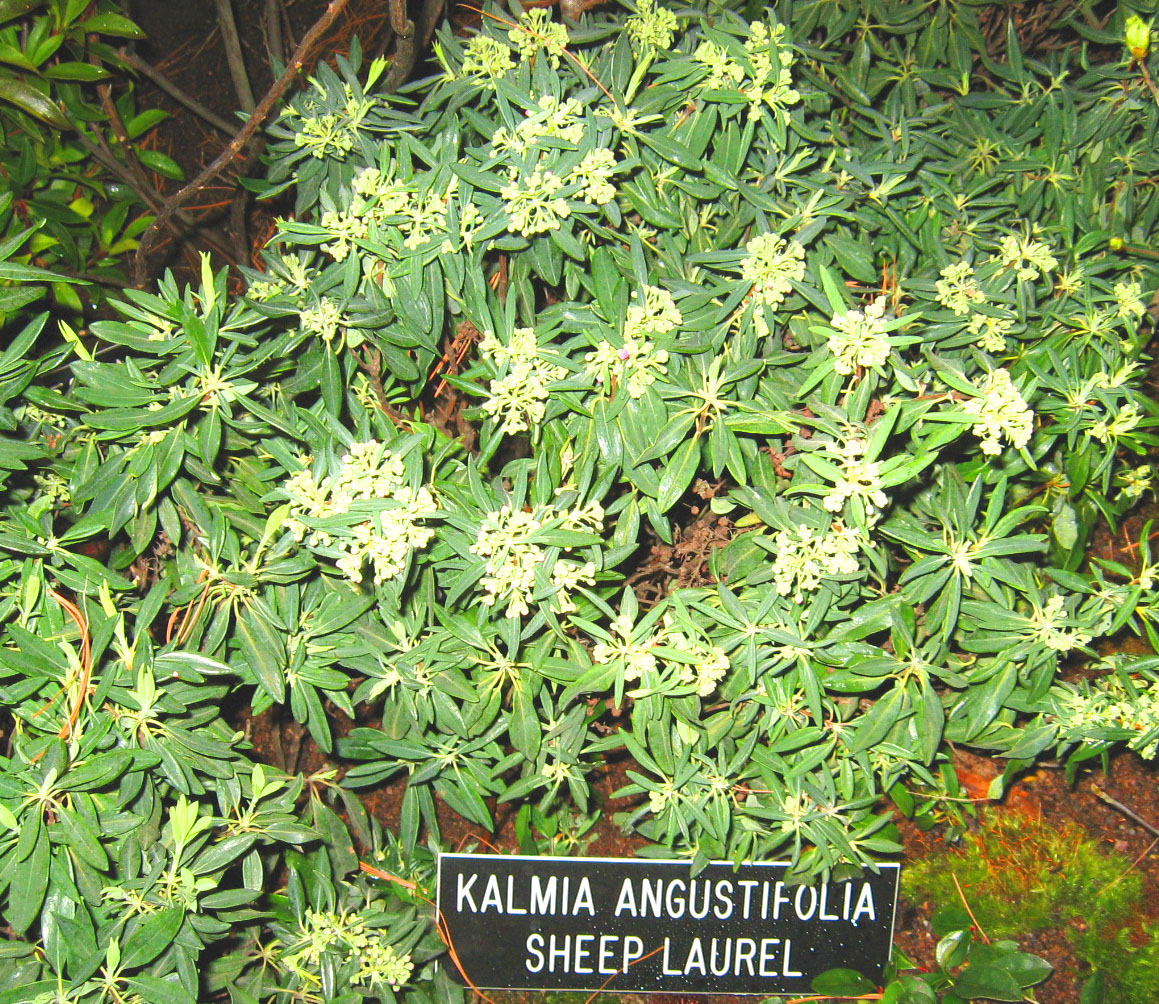

Peter Collinson originally introduced Kalmia angustifolia to England in 1736. Since then, it has been bred and cultivated as an ornamental garden shrub both in Europe and the US. It prefers a moist, acidic soil in partial shade. The species has gained the Royal Horticultural Society's Award of Garden Merit. Numerous cultivars have been selected for garden use, of which K. angustifolia f. rubra, with rich red flowers, has also won the award.

Indigenous uses of K. angustifolia included treatment for swelling and other inflammatory issues. More recent investigation of this plant for cosmetic uses has shown potential due to its chemical makeup.

== Toxicity ==
Kalmia contains a glycoside, known as andromedotoxin. It is poisonous to mammals. Hence, it can be unwelcome in pastures. Several of its folk-names testify to the plant's toxicity: 'lamb-kill', 'sheep kill', 'calf-kill', 'pig laurel', 'sheep-laurel' and 'sheep-poison'. It is also known as narrow-leaved laurel and dwarf laurel.

== Southern sheepkill ==
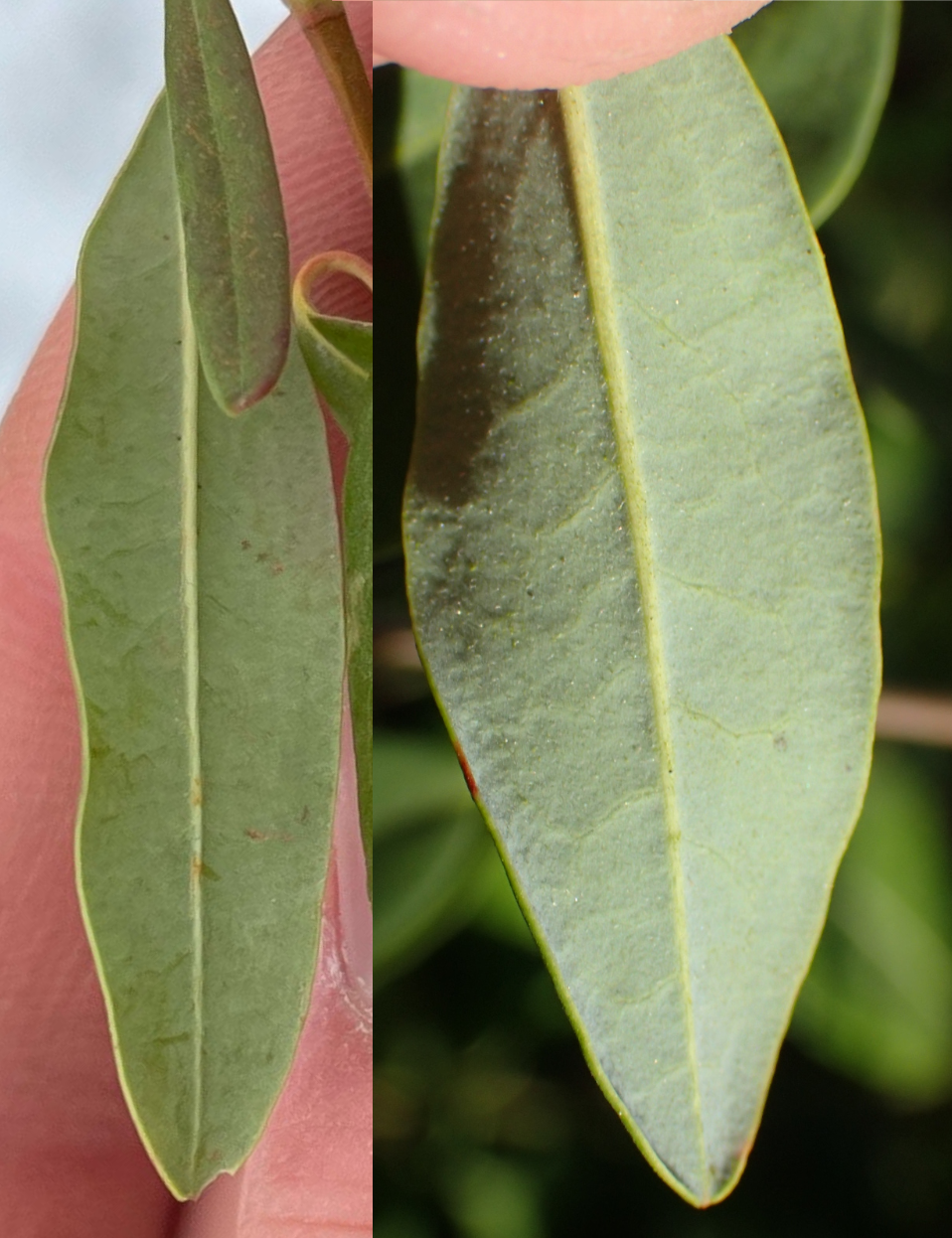
K. a. ssp. angustifolia (left) vs. K. a. ssp. carolina (right)

Carolina wicky, southern sheepkill, or Carolina bog myrtle is a shrub found from southeastern Virginia through Georgia. Originally classified as Kalmia carolina, authorities disagree on whether it should continue to be considered a separate species, or whether it should be classified as a variety or subspecies of K. angustifolia. It is essentially allopatric with K. angustifolia ssp. angustifolia; their ranges only intersect in Southampton County, Virginia. Aside from native range, the two types can be distinguished by the undersides of their leaves; southern sheepkill has a dense fuzz, absent from the smooth surface of sheep laurel.
