= Chetco =

Chetco may refer to:

- Chetco people, a group of Native Americans who lived in southwestern Oregon in the United States
- Chetco language (ISO 639-3: ctc), also known as the Tolowa language (ISO 639-3: tol)
- Chetco River, a river named for the tribe, flowing to the Pacific Ocean in Curry County, Oregon in the United States
- Chetco Peak, a mountain near the source of the Chetco River in Oregon in the United States
- USS Chetco (AT-99) - original name of USS Penguin (ASR-12)
- Chetco effect - also known as the Brookings effect, a weather pattern off the mouth of the Chetco River at the city of Brookings on the Oregon coast
