= François Dufour (Play Bac) =

French game designer

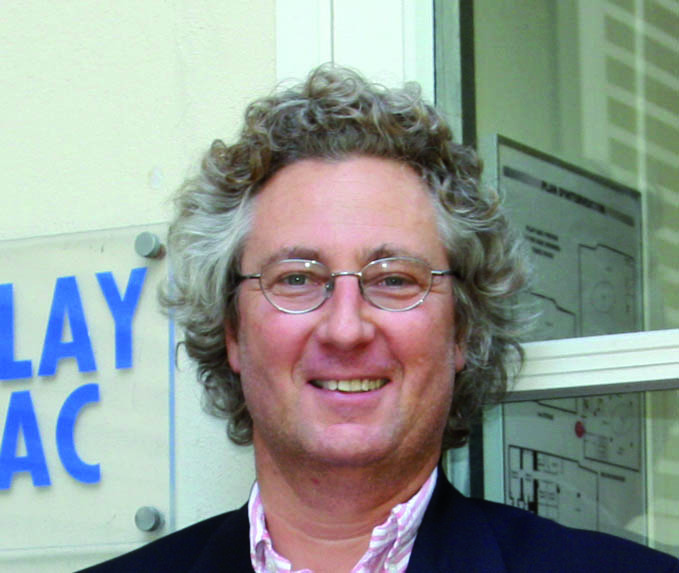

François Dufour is the editor-in-chief and cofounder of Mon Quotidien, which is the first daily newspaper for children, launched in France on January 5, 1995. He is also editor-in-chief of prize-winning Le Petit Quotidien and [L’Actu both created in 1998. This three dailies have around 150,000 subscribers in France, whereof 20,000 are classes. They are the only existing dailies for children in Europe, even in the Western world. They come out six days a week, but not on Sundays, only by subscription and are meant for young people between 7 and 17 and their parents.

There is also an extra weekly supplement in English: My Weekly.

Dufour is also editor-in-chief for L'Actu-Éco, a business weekly newspaper intended to help children understand the basics of economy through everyday news.

== Biography ==
Born in 1961, and a graduate from Sciences Po (Paris), François Dufour invented the game Play Bac with two other friends, Jérôme Saltet and Gaëtan Burrus, on a train between Paris and le Touquet on 19 October 1985. He then established the publishing house Play Bac in order to publish his game. Dufour, Saltet, and Burrus, are also the creators of the curriculum-based games Les Incollables which are sold throughout the world with more than 50 million copies, known in the US as Brain Quest (licensed to Workman Publishing).

He is the editor and co-founder of the first newspaper for children created in France in 1995: My daily. He is also the editor of the Petit Quotidien (Grand Media Award 1999), The News (Grand Prix SPQN 2010) founded in 1998, and Éco (economic weekly for students) which was launched in 2009, all of which are published by Play Bac Presse (Economic Journalism Prize IPJ-Dauphine 2008).

On May 16, 2011, live from the courtroom via Twitter, @dufourdufour, reported the arraignment of the then IMF president (and possible next president of France) Dominique Strauss-Kahn after his arrest in New York City. Within 50 minutes, his scoop in 40 tweets in French and in English, came ahead of all other medias.

Expert of Japan (cooperating to Paribas, 1984–1985) [ ref. desired] and the United States, he is an Eisenhower Fellow (in 1998) and a Young Leader of the French-American Foundation 6 (2005). Dufour was a lecturer at the Institute of Political Studies in Paris. Dufour is a member of the jury of literary prize Clara, "Teen News", chaired by Erik Orsenna 7 . François Dufour spoke on Europe 1 the summer Chronic "Tics the Media" (2013).

== Engagements ==
Dufour is a board member of the World Association of Newspapers, representing the French national newspapers and also a board member of the Global Editors Network since its creation in April 2011.

In 2008, Dufour became an executive member of the CODICE (linked to the French Ministry of Finance), whose mission is to boost the economic culture of the French population, particularly of the youth. Also in 2008, he became one of the co-presidents of the États Généraux de la Presse Écrite, an industry reunion working to save the French written press, refusing the initiative "l'Ordre du Mérite" under French resident Sarkozy.

Defending a strict journalism during the revelation of the President Francois Hollande with actress Julie Gayet in 2014, Dufour defended the respect of privacy against the news written in the magazine Closer by publishing an article in the journal The World and to the television show Tonight or Never.

Dufour is a jury member of the Prix Clara, a literary award for young writers of short stories, the Best Young Journalist Prize (L’Actu/RTL), and the Best School Newspaper (Mon Quotidien/Le Sénat).

In 2009, Play Bac Presse received the Prix Dauphine-IPJ for its "simple way of explaining economy".

In 2015, Dufour wrote an article published in several global newspapers (Ouest-France, Corriere della Sera, Le Nouvel Observateur, Clarin, Hürriyet, Irish Independent Huffington Post, Telegraph,...) proposing to grant refugee status in Africa and bring refugees by plane (not boat) in order to prevent migrants from drowning.

For his reporting from Lampedusa, Dufour received the French-American Foundation Immigration Journalism Award in 2015.

== Bibliography ==
- Comment ne pas rater son bac, Librio, April 18, 2007, 93 pages. (ISBN 978-2290002247) - Describes Dufour's successful attempt to achieve a baccalaureate degree in 2006 without preparation. (publisher: Librio, 2006).
- Les journalistes français sont-ils si mauvais ?, Larousse, coll. « À dire vrai », 15 janvier 2009, 128 p. (ISBN 978-2035845214) Discusses journalistic values and the use of the conditional tense in journalism written on war.
- DSK, 16 mai 2011, Play Bac, coll. « KatouMalou », 16 mars 2012, 160 p. (ISBN 978-2366550009, présentation en ligne) DSK speaks to the first audience in New York as the second row of the republic.
- Tree Shaker, The Life of Nelson Mandela, Bill Keller, 13 December 2013 (ISBN 159643533X) Co-translates into French the Nelson Mandela biography written by Bill Keller.
- L'assassinat de JFK, Play Bac, coll. "KatouMalou"; 22 octobre 2013, 120 p. (ISBN 978-2809650884). Examines the assassination of US President John F. Kennedy.
- Les 20 premières années en 200 Unes mémorables, Play Bac Presse (1995–2015), coll. "KatouMalou", 28 décembre 2014, (ISBN 978-280965-397-7). Discusses 20 years of journalism for children through 200 journals.
