= Port of Brookings Harbor =

Port authority for Brookings and Harbor, Oregon

Coordinates: 42.047611°N 124.268703°W

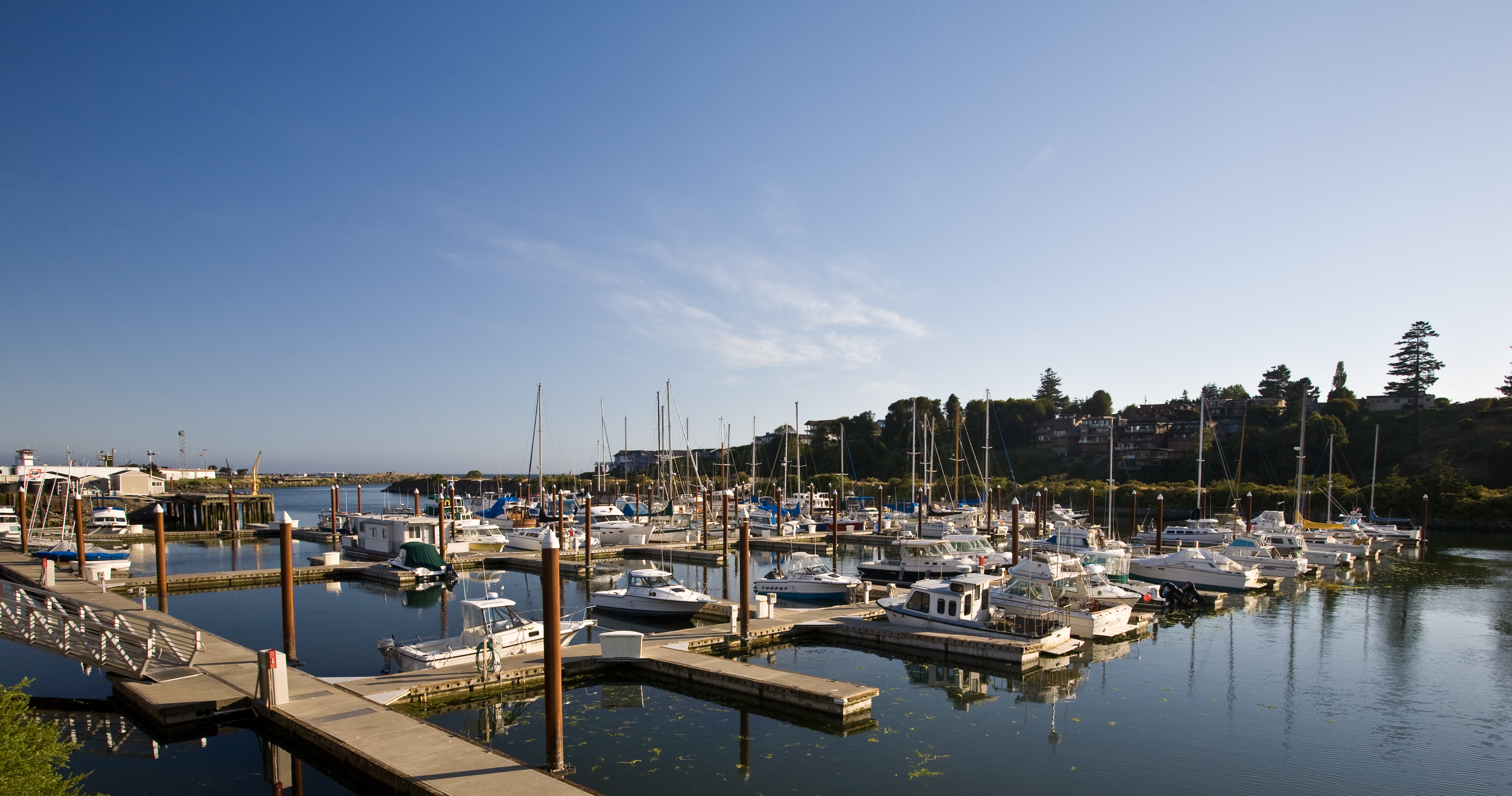
Brookings Harbor

The Port of Brookings-Harbor is the port authority for the city of Brookings, Oregon, United States, and serving the neighboring community of Harbor. The district covers 400 square miles (1,000 km^{2}) from the mouth of the Chetco River south to the Oregon-California border, north to the mouth of the Pistol River, and east to the Curry-Josephine county line. The district is governed by a five-member commission elected at-large from the district population of approximately 16,000.

It is the busiest recreational port on the Oregon Coast, generating more than 31,000 boat trips for more than 95,000 people, and is one of the most active harbors for Chinook salmon on the coast.

Due to the unique south-facing bar orientation (as opposed to most Oregon bars facing due west) with the protection provided by Chetco Point, the Chetco bar is more passable than any other.

== Events ==
The port is locally known for hosting many festivals and events, such as the Pirates of the Pacific Festival.

== History ==
The port district had its beginnings in a deep-water harbor constructed in 1912 by the Brookings Lumber and Box Company, which founded and owned the company town of Brookings. In 1956, a special election was held that created the Port of Brookings Port District. Governor Elmo Smith appointed the first port commission.

The Port of Brookings Harbor was severely damaged on March 11, 2011 by a tsunami caused by the Tōhoku earthquake off the coast of Japan; damages were estimated at $6.7 million. The last boat sunk by the tsunami was raised from the bottom of the harbor on March 22. The port re-opened for business on the same day.
