= Harbor Hills, Oregon =

Coordinates: 42°03′08″N 124°14′11″W

The Harbor Hills are a range of hills in Oregon, United States, which constitute the first ridge overlooking and parallel to the Pacific Coast north of the California/Oregon border. They run from the Chetco River to their north to the Winchuck River to their South.

They are separated from the forests and mountains to the east by the Jacks Creek Valley.
