= The Ogress and the Orphans =

2022 children's book by Kelly Barnhill

- Author: Kelly Barnhill
- Language: English
- Genre: Children's literature
- Publisher: Algonquin Books
- Publication date: March 8, 2022
- Publication place: United States
- Pages: 390
- Awards: National Book Award shortlist
- ISBN: 978-1-64375-074-3

The Ogress and the Orphans is a children's book by American writer Kelly Barnhill and published on March 8, 2022, by Algonquin Books. It counts the events of a small fictional town, which loses its charm after the library is burned down and an orphan goes missing, leading to its citizen becoming less welcoming and more suspicious of one another, eventually blaming an ogress who had just moved in.

Barnhill's book received starred reviews from specialized outlets, and was praised for its portrayal of topics such as fake news and the importance of a community. It was shortlisted for a National Book Award in the Young People's Literature category.

== Background ==
After The Girl Who Drank the Moon won a Newbery Medal in 2017, Kelly Barnhill had given up on publishing new books due to impostor syndrome. Barnhill kept writing fairy tales privately in the following years, and, in 2020, one of these stories "didn't feel the same as everything else," so she decided to expand on it.

Barnhill finished the manuscript for the book around the time George Floyd was murdered, and after seeing the community's response to this event, which included donation of basic items to people in need, she discussed with her editor about adding that aspect to the narrative of The Ogress and the Orphans. Barnhill also sought to explore in the book "the conflict and the generosity she was seeing in the world" during the COVID-19 pandemic.

== Reception ==
The Ogress and the Orphans is a New York Times Best Seller.

The book was generally well-received by critics, including starred reviewed from Booklist, Kirkus Reviews, Publishers Weekly, School Library Journal, and Shelf Awareness. Booklist's Julia Smith wrote, "Barnhill’s gift for storytelling immediately draws readers into this character-driven tale where dragons lurk, crows prove great friends, and an unusual narrator relays events with a unique perspective. These fairy-tale trappings cloak modern lessons and timeless ideals that readers will do well to take to heart, no matter their age." Kirkus called the book "as exquisite as it is moving," and commented on the story's pace, which allows for readers to "form their own opinions on the book's philosophical and thematic questions." Publishers Weekly also noted the "slowly unfurling, deliberately paced" storytelling by Barnhill, and praised her use of allegories to present sociopolitical topics to the readers. Jaclyn Fulwood, writing for Shelf Awareness, noted, "Despite the deceptive simplicity of the story, characters act in wonderfully complex ways... Deeply moving and often hilarious, The Ogress and the Orphans will encourage readers to live by the Ogress's adage: 'The more you give, the more you have.'" School Library Journal called the book "a middle grade novel with heart," saying it "will be a hit with educators, parents, and students who will push through the injustices to favor hope."

The School Librarian's reviewer called the book a "powerful fable that draws you in and challenges the reader." They noted how Barnhill discusses pertinent topics, such as fake news, propaganda and power abuse. They conclude by calling it a "fantastic book." A review published by The Horn Book Magazine called The Ogress and the Orphans "one of the more buoyant of the fictional responses to 'the Dark Days of a Certain Administration'."

Kirkus and Shelf Awareness included The Ogress and the Orphans on their lists of the best children's and young adult books of the year. Booklist included it in their top 10 lists for "SF/Fantasy & Horror for Youth" and "Middle-Grade Novels Where Kids Save the Day."

Awards and honors for The Ogress and the Orphans
Year	Award/Honor	Result	Ref.
2022	National Book Award for Young People's Literature	Shortlist	
2022	Goodreads Choice Award for Middle Grade & Children's	Nominee	
2023	ALA Best Fiction for Young Adults	Selection	
2023	Heavy Medal Award	Finalist	
