= Chetco River =

River in Oregon, United States

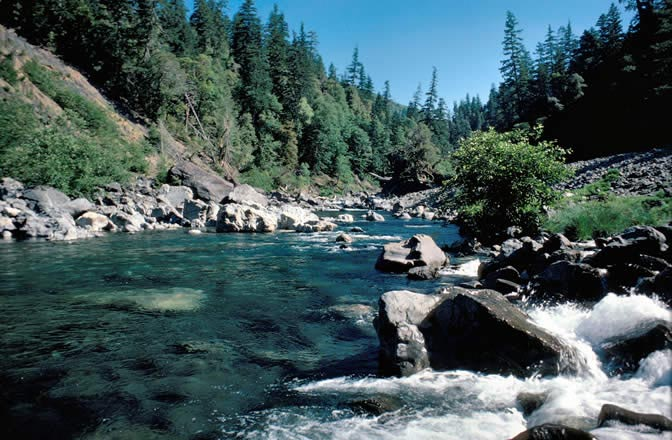
- Chetco River near Boulder Creek

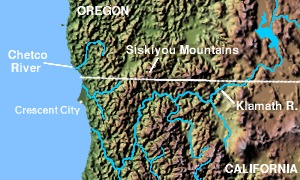
- Etymology: Named after the Chetco Native Americans

Location
- Country: United States
- State: Oregon
- County: Curry County

Physical characteristics
- Source: Northwest of Chetco Peak
  - location: Oregon Coast Range, Curry County, Oregon
  - coordinates: 42°07′47″N 123°52′39″W
  - elevation: 3,201 ft (976 m) (Note: Source elevation derived from Google Earth search using Geographic Names Information System (GNIS) source coordinates.)
- Mouth: Pacific Ocean
  - location: Brookings, Curry County, Oregon
  - coordinates: 42°02′43″N 124°16′14″W
  - elevation: 0 ft (0 m)
- Length: 56 mi (90 km)
- Basin size: 352 mi^{2} (910 km^{2})
- Discharge
  - location: river mile 10.7 (river kilometer 17.2)
  - average: 2,263 cu ft/s (64.1 m^{3}/s)
  - minimum: 42 cu ft/s (1.2 m^{3}/s)(October 14, 1987)
  - maximum: 85,400 cu ft/s (2,420 m^{3}/s)(December 22, 1964)

National Wild and Scenic River
- Type: Wild, Scenic, Recreational
- Designated: October 28, 1988

The Chetco River is a 56-mile-long (90 km) stream located in the southwestern portion of the U.S. state of Oregon. It drains approximately 352 square miles (912 km^{2}) of Curry County. Flowing through a rugged and isolated coastal region, it descends rapidly from about 3,200 feet (975 m) to sea level at the Pacific Ocean. Except for the lowermost 5 miles (8 km), the river is located entirely within the Rogue River – Siskiyou National Forest. The river rises in the Kalmiopsis Wilderness, northwest of Chetco Peak at the junction of the Oregon Coast Range and the Klamath Mountains. It flows generally north, west, and then southwest, before emptying into the ocean between Brookings and Harbor, approximately 6 miles (10 km) north of the California state line. The Chetco River's watershed remains largely undeveloped, protected by the Rogue River – Siskiyou National Forest and the Kalmiopsis Wilderness. The upper 45 miles (72 km) of the river have been designated Wild and Scenic since 1988.

Native Americans have lived in the Chetco River's watershed for the last one to three thousand years. Several explorers, including Sir Francis Drake, George Vancouver, and Jedediah Smith, visited the region between the 16th and 19th centuries, and found the Chetco people inhabiting the area. Non-indigenous settlers arrived soon after gold and other precious metals were discovered in the 1840s and 1850s. The town of Brookings was founded in the early 20th century, and incorporated in 1951. Fourteen thousand residents of Brookings and Harbor rely on the Chetco for drinking water.

Supporting a large population of salmon and trout, the Chetco's water is of very high quality. The watershed is home to many other species, including several that are endemic to the Siskiyou Mountains area. The northernmost grove of Redwoods—the tallest trees on Earth—grow in the southern region of the Chetco's drainage basin. In total, the river is home to over 200 species of animals, and 97 percent of the watershed is forested.

== Course ==
The Chetco River begins about 4 miles (6 km) east of Chetco Peak, approximately 3,201 feet (975.7 m) above sea level. It flows north, gathering small tributaries such as the Little Chetco River and Babyfoot Creek. The river turns west near the 5,098-foot-tall (1,554 m) Pearsoll Peak, the highest point in the watershed. It receives Box Canyon Creek on the left bank, Tincup Creek on the right bank, and Boulder Creek on the left. It then flows south, gathering the South Fork Chetco River. A few miles farther south, the river passes through a Redwood grove. It flows between Bosley Butte to the north and Mount Emily to the south; the latter is the impact site of one of only four bombs known to have been dropped in the continental United States by an enemy aircraft. This occurred during the Lookout Air Raids of 1942.

Turning southwest, the river flows through Alfred A. Loeb State Park and collects the North Fork Chetco River on the right at river mile (RM) 5 (or river kilometer (RK) 8). The Chetco becomes an estuary about 1.7 miles (2.7 km) from its mouth. It passes through the communities of Brookings to the north and Harbor to the south, and discharges into the Pacific Ocean.

=== Discharge ===
The United States Geological Survey monitors the flow of the Chetco River at a stream gauge at RM 10.7 (RK 17.2), which is 6.8 miles (11 km) northeast of Brookings. It opened in 1969, and continues to operate. The average flow was 2,263 cubic feet per second (64.08 m^{3}/s) from a drainage area of 271 square miles (702 km^{2}), about 77 percent of the Chetco's total drainage basin. The maximum recorded flow was 85,400 cubic feet per second (2,420 m^{3}/s) on December 22, 1964, during the Pacific Northwest flood of 1964. The minimum flow was 42 cubic feet per second (1.2 m^{3}/s) on October 14, 1987.

== Watershed ==
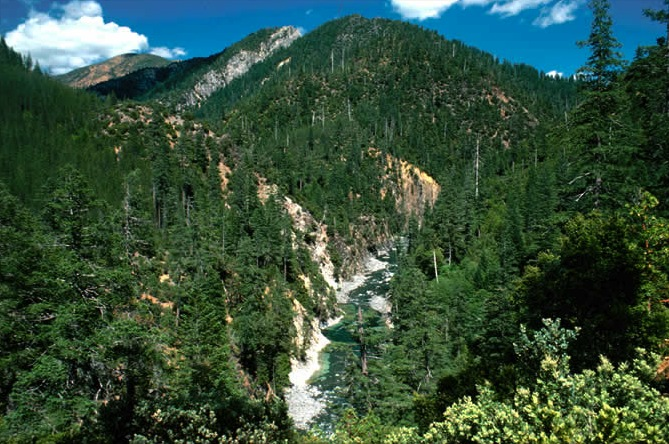
The Chetco River flowing through the Kalmiopsis Wilderness

The Chetco River drains 352 square miles (912 km^{2}) of the southern Oregon Coast. About 78 percent is owned by the United States Forest Service, and another 5 percent is owned by the Bureau of Land Management. Sixteen percent is privately owned, while the remaining one percent is managed by the cities of Brookings and Harbor, Curry County, and the state of Oregon. Approximately 97 percent of the land is used for forestry, 2 percent for agriculture and rural areas, and 1 percent is urban. Gravel and minerals are mined from the lower and upper regions of the watershed, respectively.

The region is mostly mountainous, characterized by steep river valleys. Elevations in the Chetco River watershed range from sea level to 5,098 feet (1,554 m) at the summit of Pearsoll Peak. Precipitation averages between 45 and 140 inches (1,143 and 3,556 mm) per year, with October through June being the wettest months. Seventy percent of surface runoff is collected from rain, and 30 percent from rain on snow. Twenty-five separate wetlands totaling 93 acres (38 ha) have been identified in the watershed. Temperatures average between 32 and 82 °F (0 and 28 °C), although the Brookings effect (or Chetco effect; similar to a foehn wind) often brings localized hot weather to the Brookings area. The increase in temperature is caused by the geography of the region; cool air funnels down the Chetco River valley from the Siskiyou and Coast ranges, gradually heating up before eventually reaching Brookings as a warm wind. The mountains also shield the area from cool marine layers. Partially as a result of this phenomenon, Brookings recorded its highest temperature ever, 108 °F (42 °C), on July 8, 2008.

Earthquakes are common, and large-scale ones occur around every 300 years. The Cascadia earthquake of 1700—estimated at 8.7–9.2 on the moment magnitude scale—caused a tsunami to sweep across California, Oregon, Washington, and British Columbia, reaching Japan the next day. It was produced when the entire Cascadia subduction zone, about 680 miles (1,100 km) long, slipped approximately 66 feet (20 m) in a megathrust event. Another major earthquake occurred in 1873 near present-day Brookings. With a magnitude of 7.3, the quake was felt from Seattle to San Francisco. Wind is also a factor in the region; storms can sometimes reach over 100 miles per hour (160 km/h). The Columbus Day Storm of 1962 brought devastating winds to nearly all of Oregon; nearby Port Orford recorded gusts exceeding 190 miles per hour (310 km/h). The storm killed 38 people across the state and caused over $200 million worth of damage. The watershed often experiences wildfires, some of them major. The Biscuit Fire of 2002 burned over 500,000 acres (200,000 ha) of the Kalmiopsis Wilderness and surrounding regions.

As of the 2010 census, the city of Brookings had a population of 6,336, while nearby Harbor had 2,391. In total, over 14,000 residents of the Brookings–Harbor area depend on the Chetco River for drinking water. Nearby watersheds include the Winchuck and Smith rivers to the south, the Pistol River to the north, and the Illinois River, a tributary of the Rogue River, to the north and east.

== Flora and fauna ==
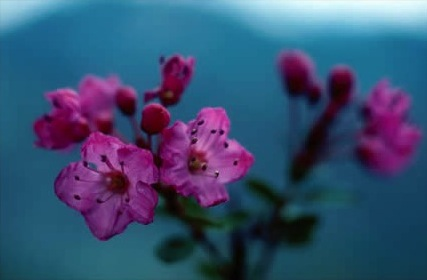
The rare Kalmiopsis plant only grows in the Siskiyou Mountains.

The Chetco River watershed is covered primarily by temperate coniferous forest, which includes species such as Douglas fir, western hemlock, white fir, Port Orford cedar, California incense cedar, and Sitka spruce. Jeffrey pine, knobcone pine, and golden chinquapin have also been identified. Hardwoods including tanoak, bigleaf maple, red alder, and Pacific madrone are common. Manzanita, hazelnut, vine maple, western skunk cabbage, and multiple species of berries and grasses make up the understory. Kalmiopsis, a flowering evergreen shrub and the namesake of the Kalmiopsis Wilderness, only grows in the Siskiyou Mountains. Several noxious weeds have also been identified, including gorse, Scotch broom, blackberries, and thistles.

The most prevalent species of the extreme southern portion of the watershed is the coastal redwood, one of the tallest types of trees on Earth. The world's northernmost redwood grove is located near the south bank of the Chetco at RM 15 (RK 24), about 8 miles (10 km) north of the California border. Trees here are around 300 to 800 years old, 5 to 13 feet (2 to 4 m) in diameter, and some exceed 300 feet (91 m) tall. The redwoods were heavily logged in the early 20th century. Prior to logging, the massive trees created their own microclimate by capturing moisture from fog, and also by the immense amount of shade they produced. The redwoods region is less mountainous than the rest of the watershed, and meandering streams are much more common.

Over 200 species of animals inhabit the river and its tributaries. Birds such as loons, grebes, ducks, kingfishers, and bald eagles are known to live around streams and other regions of the watershed. Auks, gulls, and terns have been spotted around the river's mouth, and black-legged kittiwakes nest in the area during the winter. The wildlife in the Kalmiopsis region of the Chetco watershed is more diverse than that of any other region in Oregon. Mammals such as American black bears, black-tailed deer, bobcats, ring-tailed cats, and gray foxes are common inhabitants of this region. The rare Siskiyou chipmunk is endemic to the Klamath Mountains. Steelhead and chinook and coho salmon are the most common anadromous fish that inhabit the Chetco River. Steelhead are abundant and have been spotted in most major and minor streams. Chinook salmon usually travel as far as Boulder Creek, about halfway between the Chetco's headwaters and its mouth. Coho also generally stay in this area, but some have been found in the Granite and Carter Creek area, about 12 miles (19 km) above Boulder Creek. Coastal cutthroat trout can be found all around the watershed; some migrate to the ocean, while others live in the river and its tributaries year round. Pacific lamprey, three-spined stickleback, and various sculpins have also been observed.

== Geology ==
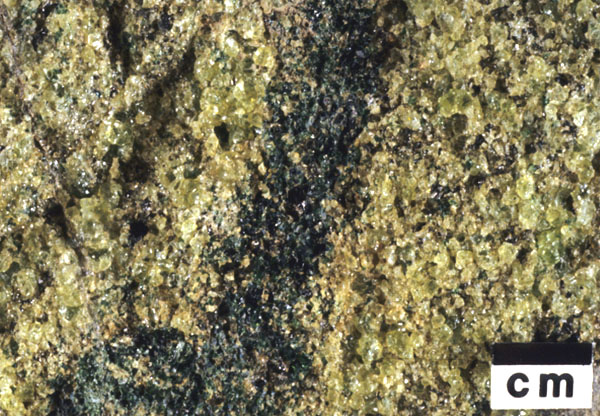
A sample of peridotite with a layer of blackish pyroxenite

The Chetco River flows through the ancient Klamath Mountain terrane, which is between 400 and 100 million years old, the oldest rocks in Oregon. The Klamath microcontinent was originally located beneath the ocean near southern California before separating hundreds of millions of years ago. Plate tectonics pushed the microcontinent north, and bits of granite, sea floor sediment, subduction zones, and coral reefs gradually accreted into small islands. Between 212 and 170 million years ago, a massive volcanic arc erupted on the Klamath microcontinent, binding the islands together in a single block. The Klamath microcontinent went through a period of intense tectonic activity known as the Siskiyou orogeny roughly 170 to 165 million years ago. The process was strong enough to force sedimentary rocks deep into the Earth's crust, melting them into large plutons of granite, which rose slowly to the surface. Shortly after, a large portion of sea floor was thrust over the older Klamath terranes; much of it is still visible atop Vulcan and Chetco peaks. This region is known as the Josephine Ophiolite, and contains a rare type of rock called peridotite, originating from the Earth's mantle.

The mountainous terrain of the Chetco River watershed was created approximately 130 million years ago when the microcontinent collided with the much larger North American continent. The process uplifted the complex and exotic terranes of the microcontinent to form the Klamath Mountains. Many glaciers carved U-shaped valleys and cirques during the last ice age, and several alpine lakes still exist today.

Today, sandstone, shale, granite, and serpentine are the primary rock types in the Chetco region. Various forms of loam comprise its soil. Erosion levels are high due to a combination of high precipitation, steep slopes, and landslides, which can result in earthflows.

== History ==
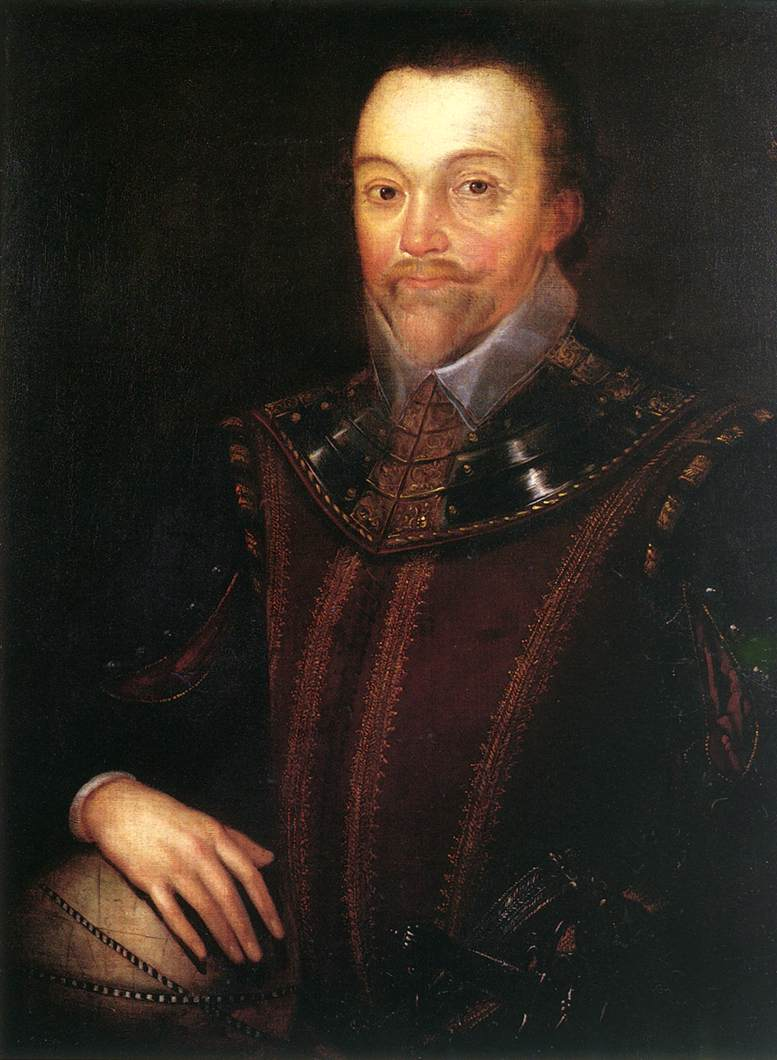
Sir Francis Drake visited the region in 1579.

Humans have lived in the Chetco River watershed since approximately 1,000 to 3,000 years ago. The first inhabitants were perhaps ancestors of the Chetco Indians and other Native American tribes, themselves descendants of the first humans who traveled across the Bering land bridge from Siberia over 10,000 years ago. At least nine separate villages were constructed along the Chetco River, including two on either side of its mouth. The Native Americans named the river "chit taa-ghii~-li~'".

The first European American to visit the area may have been Sir Francis Drake on June 5, 1579, during his circumnavigation of the world. The Vancouver Expedition also explored the area in 1792. In June 1828 Jedediah Smith and his company of fur traders camped on the south bank of the river near a Native American village. Between 1853 and 1855, many Native Americans were killed and their villages destroyed in skirmishes occurring around the same time as the nearby Rogue River Wars. On July 9, 1856, the remaining Chetco were marched north to the Siletz Reservation.

Oregon—and therefore the Chetco watershed—was jointly occupied by the United Kingdom and the United States after the Treaty of 1818 was signed. The Oregon Treaty was ratified in 1846, giving the United States ownership of Oregon. Soon after, the Oregon Territory was established, and Oregon became a U.S. state on February 14, 1859.

The discovery of gold and other precious metals in the watershed brought settlers to the region in the 1840s and 1850s. Nickel, cobalt, and chromium were also mined. The town of Harbor was founded on the south bank of the Chetco River in 1891, and a ferry service across the river opened in 1904. It was shut down in 1915 when the Chetco Bridge opened. In 1912, the Brookings Lumber & Box Company moved north from the San Bernardino Mountains in southern California to the southern Oregon coast region. The company constructed a sawmill in 1914, and founded the town of Brookings. Brookings was not incorporated until 1951. The region remained relatively isolated due to its mountainous terrain until 1924, when Highway 101 was extended from Crescent City, California, to Brookings. In 1932, the Isaac Lee Patterson Bridge was completed over the Rogue River to the north, connecting the region to the rest of the Oregon coast. In 1917, a 1,200-foot-long (366 m) wharf was built at the mouth of the river. Jetties were constructed on either side of its mouth by the United States Army Corps of Engineers in 1957.

The Siskiyou National Forest was created on October 5, 1906, protecting the entire upper portion of the Chetco watershed. The nearby Rogue River National Forest was combined with it in 2004, creating the nearly 1,800,000-acre (728,000 ha) Rogue River – Siskiyou National Forest. In 1964, the United States Congress set aside over 80,000 acres (32,000 ha) of the eastern Chetco River watershed and surrounding regions to create the Kalmiopsis Wilderness. The wilderness was expanded several times in the 1970s, and now encompasses over 180,000 acres (72,800 ha).

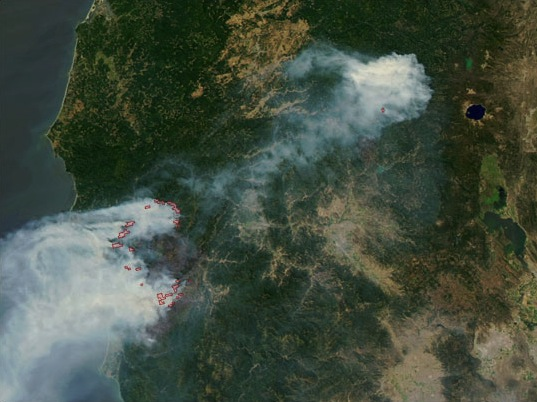
The smoke plume produced by the Biscuit Fire in 2002

On October 28, 1988, a 44.5-mile (71.6 km) stretch of the Chetco River was designated a National Wild and Scenic River, from its headwaters to the boundary of the Rogue River – Siskiyou National Forest. In a court case in 1994, the Chetco was determined to be navigable. In 2002, over 500,000 acres (202,000 ha) of the eastern portion of the watershed and surrounding regions were destroyed in the Biscuit Fire. Originally five separate fires, it was caused by several lightning strikes between July 12 and 15. By August 17, all five had burned together, creating one massive fire. It burned for over five months and was not fully extinguished until December 31.

In 2002, 45 acres (18 ha) of land on the Little Chetco River were sold to Washington real estate developer David Rutan, only several months after the Biscuit Fire tore through the region. He opened a gold mining camp on the site in 2007, flying in customers by helicopter. Curry County officials soon stated that the camp violated zoning and sanitation laws, but inspections were stymied because of the area's inaccessibility. Rutan bought several more claims in the Wild and Scenic section of the Chetco River in the following years, beginning 6 miles (10 km) inside the Kalmiopsis Wilderness, and ending 24 miles (39 km) downstream. Despite environmentalists' concerns, he proposed mining the Chetco riverbed for gold and minerals via commercial suction dredges, permitted by the General Mining Act of 1872. In 2010, the Chetco River was identified as the seventh most endangered river in America by advocacy organization American Rivers, facing a threat of "motorized instream mining". Oregon's governor, Ted Kulongoski, two senators, Ron Wyden and Jeff Merkley, and congressman Peter DeFazio all asked the United States Department of Agriculture to withdraw the Chetco River from the 1872 Mining Act, thus preventing mineral mining on the river. However, Rutan forfeited his claims by not paying his annual filing fees to the Bureau of Land Management in 2011.

== Pollution ==
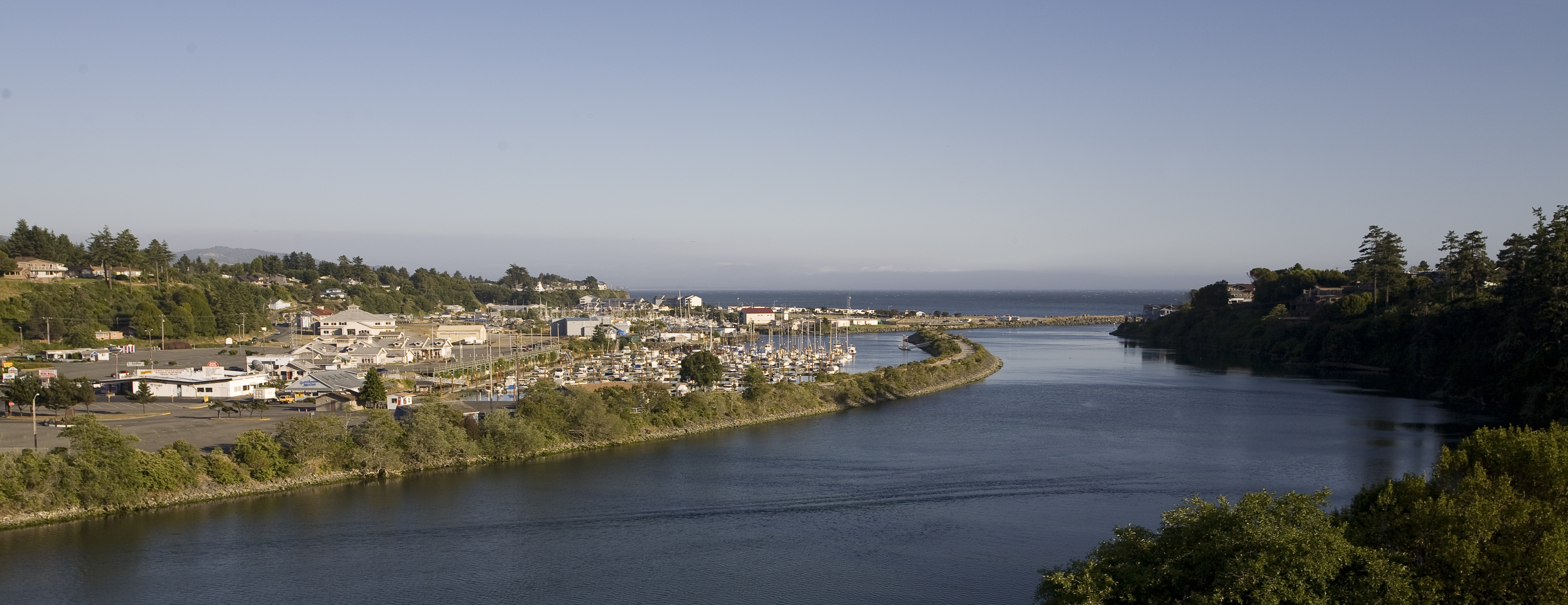
A panorama of the Chetco River near its mouth, with Harbor, Oregon, in the background

The Oregon Department of Environmental Quality (DEQ) has monitored the Chetco River for eight different parameters that affect water quality: temperature, oxygen saturation, pH, nutrients, bacteria, chemical contaminants such as pesticides and metals, turbidity, and alkalinity. Streams that exceed the standard level are then placed on the DEQ 303d list in accordance with the Clean Water Act. The Chetco from Box Canyon Creek to its mouth exceeded the standard level for temperature and turbidity. The North Fork, South Fork, and other tributaries were also listed for temperature and turbidity. All tributaries of the Chetco usually exceed the 64 °F (18 °C) temperature standard. Water temperatures range from 62.6 °F (17.0 °C) at Bosley Creek to 76 °F (24 °C) at Willow Bar. High turbidity levels in the Chetco River watershed are usually caused by landslides, various forms of erosion, and plugged road culverts.

On the Oregon Water Quality Index (OWQI) used by DEQ, water quality scores can vary from 10 (worst) to 100 (ideal). The average for the Chetco River at RM 10.8 (RK 17.4) between 1998 and 2007 was 95 (excellent) in the summer and 90 in the fall, winter, and spring. These scores are comparable to the 1986 to 1995 results of 94 and 93. Despite the excellent ratings, the Chetco River actually ranks as the second most polluted stream in Curry County, after Floras Creek, a tributary of the New River.

== Recreation ==
Fishing, swimming, boating, camping, sightseeing, and picnicking are the primary recreational activities in the watershed. Whitewater kayaking is also popular in the winter months when water levels are high. Several trails are maintained throughout the Kalmiopsis Wilderness, as well as other regions in the watershed. Eight boat launches are located on the river between its confluence with the south fork and its mouth. Alfred A. Loeb State Park, located on the banks of the Chetco, has three cabins and 48 camping sites.

Several large parks are located in Brookings. The 33-acre (13 ha) Azalea Park in Brookings features five species of wild azaleas. The park was designated an Oregon State Park in 1939, but was given to Brookings in 1993. It hosts the American Music Festival from June until September. The Nature's Coastal Holiday light show is displayed in Azalea Park every December. Chetco Point Park, located near the wharf, has several fire rings and picnic tables, as well as views of the river, the Pacific Ocean, and the Port of Brookings Harbor. It is home to the rare Wolf's Evening Primrose.

== See also ==
- List of rivers of Oregon
- List of longest streams of Oregon
- List of National Wild and Scenic Rivers

== Notes and references ==
Notes

== Bibliography ==
Books

- Atwater, Brian; Satoko, Musumi-Rokkaku; Kenji, Satake; Yoshinobu, Tsuji; Kazue, Ueda; Yamaguchi, David (2005). The Orphan Tsunami of 1700. Reston, Virginia: United States Geological Survey. ISBN 978-0-295-98535-0. OCLC 60453634.
- Bishop, Ellen (2004). Best Hikes with Dogs Oregon. Seattle, Washington: The Mountaineers Books. ISBN 978-0-89886-944-6. OCLC 53356372.
- Bishop, Ellen (2003). In Search of Ancient Oregon. Portland, Oregon: Timber Press. ISBN 978-0-88192-590-6. OCLC 51614008.
- Bishop, Ellen; Allen, John (1996). Hiking Oregon's Geology. Seattle, Washington: The Mountaineers Books. ISBN 978-0-585-34087-6. OCLC 47008924.
- Brereton, Robert (1907). Question: Did Sir Francis Drake land on any part of the Oregon coast?. Portland, Oregon: The J. K. Gill Company. OCLC 16259718.
- Carey, Charles (1922). History of Oregon. Chicago, Illinois: Pioneer Historical Publishing Company. p. 915. OCLC 2077442.
- Carranco, Lynwood; Labbe, John (2003). Logging the Redwoods. Caldwell, Idaho: Caxton Press. ISBN 978-0-87004-373-4. OCLC 174139535.
- Coan, Charles (1922). The adoption of the reservation policy in Pacific Northwest, 1853–1855. Portland, Oregon: The Ivy Press. OCLC 18730769.
- Davis, Richard, ed. (1983). Encyclopedia of American Forest and Conservation History (PDF). Vol. 2. New York: Macmillan Publishing Company. pp. 743–788. ISBN 978-0-02-907350-6. OCLC 9350600. Archived from the original (PDF) on October 28, 2012.
- Gaston, Joseph (1912). The centennial history of Oregon, 1811–1912. Chicago, Illinois: S. J. Clark Publishing Company. p. 64. OCLC 1656126.
- Jepson, Willis (1896). Erythea. Vol. 4–5. University of California. OCLC 446879907.
- Morris, Elizabeth; Morris, Mark; Jewell, Judy; McRae, W. C.; McCue, Elizabeth (2007). Moon Oregon (7th ed.). Emeryville, California: Avalon Travel. ISBN 978-1-56691-930-2. OCLC 74524856.
- Ostertag, Rhonda; Ostertag, George (2001). 75 Hikes in Oregon's Coast Range and Siskiyous (2 ed.). Seattle, Washington: The Mountaineers Books. ISBN 978-0-89886-620-9. OCLC 45387216.
- Rakestraw, John (2007). Birding Oregon. Guilford, Connecticut: Globe Pequot. ISBN 978-0-7627-3913-4. OCLC 65165451.
- Schwartz, E. A. (1997). The Rogue River Indian War and its aftermath, 1850–1980. Norman, Oklahoma: University of Oklahoma Press. ISBN 978-0-585-14637-9. OCLC 44964292.
- Wuerthner, George (2002). Oregon's Wilderness Areas. Englewood, Colorado: Westcliffe Publishers. ISBN 978-1-56579-434-4. OCLC 50243182.
- Yuskavitch, Jim (2001). Fishing Oregon. Guilford, Connecticut: Globe Pequot. ISBN 978-1-56044-728-3. OCLC 47361440.

News articles

- Barnard, Jeff (March 7, 2012). "Developer forfeits Chetco River gold mining claims". Mail Tribune. Medford, Oregon. Archived from the original on 2014-01-09.
- Burel, Patty (September 19, 2008). "Trail Dedication at Japanese Bombing Site Set". FS Today. Archived from the original on September 10, 2011.
- "Chetco River Boundary Dispute Settled". Oregon Department of State Lands. October 7, 2002. Archived from the original on June 9, 2011.
- Fattig, Paul (June 2, 2010). "Chetco River listed among threatened". Mail Tribune. Medford, Oregon. Archived from the original on 2011-06-10.
- Kettler, Bill (July 10, 2008). "108 ... in Brookings?". Mail Tribune. Medford, Oregon. Archived from the original on 2012-09-22.
- "News clippings reflect Brookings early years". Curry Coastal Pilot. Brookings, Oregon. May 11, 2001. Archived from the original on January 6, 2014.
- Since You Asked (August 7, 2004). "Brookings warms up with wind". Mail Tribune. Medford, Oregon. Archived from the original on January 6, 2014.
- The Associated Press (May 31, 2002). "Study takes second look at big quake". The Register-Guard. Eugene, Oregon.
- Zaitz, Les (March 13, 2010). "Developer lays claim to more than gold in Oregon wilderness". The Oregonian. Portland, Oregon.

Websites

- "About the Forest". United States Forest Service.
- Allen, Cain (2003). "Kalmiopsis Wilderness". Oregon History Project.
- "Alfred A. Loeb State Park". Oregon Parks and Recreation Department.
- "American Music Festival". City of Brookings.
- Anderson, Gregory D.S.; Harrison, K. David (2007). "Siletz Talking Dictionary". Living Tongues Institute for Endangered Languages.
- "Azalea Park". City of Brookings.
- "Brookings city, Oregon". United States Census Bureau.
- "Chetco Point Park". City of Brookings.
- "Chetco River". United States Forest Service.
- "Harbor CDP, Oregon". United States Census Bureau.
- "Jedediah Smith Route, 1828". Oregon Historic Trails Fund.
- "History of the Port of Brookings-Harbor". Port of Brookings Harbor. Archived from the original on January 6, 2014.
- "Some of the Area's Windstorms". National Weather Service.
- "West Coast Athabaskans". University of Oregon Department of Linguistics. February 8, 1997. Archived from the original on June 14, 2010.

Other

- "#7 Chetco River" (PDF). American Rivers. 2010. Archived from the original (PDF) on September 29, 2011.
- Oregon Road and Recreation Atlas (Map) (4th ed.). 1:225,000. Medford, Oregon: Benchmark Maps. 2010. ISBN 978-0-929591-62-9. OCLC 466904230.
- "Biscuit Fire Analysis of Fire Response, Resource Availability, and Personnel Certification Standards" (PDF). General Accounting Office. April 2004.
- "Brookings, Oregon" (PDF). Northwest Fisheries Science Center. Archived from the original (PDF) on February 24, 2012.
- "Chetco River". Geographic Names Information System. United States Geological Survey, United States Department of the Interior. November 28, 1980.
- "Chetco River" (PDF). Oregon State Marine Board. Archived from the original (PDF) on May 28, 2010.
- Maguire, Mike (June 2001a). "Chetco River Watershed Assessment" (PDF). South Coast Watershed Council.
- Maguire, Mike (June 2001b). "Port Orford Watershed Assessment" (PDF). South Coast Watershed Council.
- "Oregon Water Quality Index Summary Report Water Years 1998–2007" (PDF). Oregon Department of Environmental Quality. May 2008. Archived from the original (PDF) on July 23, 2011.
- United States Geological Survey (June 14, 2010). Mount Emily quadrangle (Topographic map). Reston, VA: United States Geological Survey – via TopoQuest.
- "14400000 Chetco River Near Brookings, OR: Water-Data Report 2012" (PDF). United States Geological Survey. 2013.
