= Pickowicz =

Pickowicz is a surname. Notable people with the surname include:

- Natasha Pickowicz (born 1984), American chef and author
- Paul G. Pickowicz (born 1945), American historian
