= Tigers, Not Daughters =

Novel by Samantha Mabry

- First edition cover
- Author: Samantha Mabry
- Language: English
- Published: 2020
- Publisher: Workman Publishing Company
- Publication place: United States

Tigers, Not Daughters is a 2020 novel by Samantha Mabry. It is about four sisters, one of whom dies by falling out of a window. The dead sister haunts the remaining sisters in the house they live in. Publishers Weekly wrote that the novel "read more like a series of vignettes." NPR reviewed it favorably.
