= Silence is a Sense =

2021 novel by Layla Al-Ammar

Silence is a Sense is a 2021 novel by Layla Al-Ammar, published by Algonquin Books. It is a novel dealing with themes such as trauma, immigration and prejudice. The novel is written in the first person perspective and features an unnamed female protagonist dealing with the troubles of being a Syrian refugee in an unnamed British town.

== Plot summary ==
The novel follows a non-linear structure with a current storyline along with various dreams and flashbacks. The book begins with the narrator describing one of her neighbours, using the nickname "no-lights-man". She describes his daily life, his food habits and a box that he keeps looking at. She goes on by describing other neighbours using similar nicknames such as "the juicer" or their actual names. Through these observations we understand that she is a nonverbal refugee. The narrator writes articles where she discusses xenophobia in Britain . She sends these articles to her editor Josie who publishes them in a newsmagazine under the pseudonym "The Voiceless". Josie is constantly pushing for more articles about her trauma and her journey through Europe, but The Voiceless will not open up.

As the book continues more characters in the neighbourhood are introduced such as the shopkeeper Hasan and the Imam Abdulrahman. The Voiceless attends a celebration at the mosque which gets interrupted by a couple of men storming in screaming insults, The Voiceless runs home. Following the scene there is a flashback to the beginning of the Arab Spring where her old friends and her lover Khalid are introduced. The novel goes back to the current time-line and The Voiceless walks around aimlessly and continues with her reflections. She goes through her old documents which contain hospital records and daily logs. These records contain more descriptions of her trauma and her journey through Europe.

In the flat opposite of hers there lives a family with an abusive husband, The Voiceless finds the daughter sitting alone in the yard crying. The girl asks if she can come to her house and she reluctantly agrees. This is the first time she's ever let anyone in the house. Later on she sees the girl's brother take out a red spraycan. In the parallel plotline she leaves her linguistic studies at the university and her friends design protest posters while the situation in Syria deteriorates.

Later on in the story The Voiceless starts developing a relationship with her neighbour No-Lights-Man, his real name is Adam. He's very politically active and tries to convince The Voiceless to join him in his fight against "the system". She declines and gives him a book instead. Further into the story the mosque is vandalised with red spray paint. The Voiceless understands that it was the son in the neighbouring family. She refrains from telling the police and doesn't interfere when people are accusing the men who came and interrupted the celebration weeks earlier. Some time passes and she is in the local shop, the men who were accused of vandalising the shop come crashing in and start threatening the shopkeeper Hasan. One of the men beat Hasan to death whilst The Voiceless sits helplessly in a corner. She writes a note to Adam where she explains that she saw the boy with the spraycan. He understands that this could have all been avoided if she had just spoken up and gets extremely disappointed in her.

She ends up staying inside for weeks. Until she sees one of her neighbours choking on his food, she runs out and uses her voice for the first time in forever. She screams the little girl's name out loud and they are able to save the old man. Finally using her voice gives her the courage to go to one of Adam's protests, she sits beside him and tells him her name.

== Development ==
Layla Al-Ammar said that "the Arab Spring uprisings, the refugee crisis, alt-right rhetoric and Islamophobia — were things I'd been deeply absorbed in from early 2011 (when the Arab Spring began). I had followed developments closely — whether it was reading books about the civil war in Syria or the refugee crisis, watching documentaries and interviews, reading human rights reports and testimonials — and had done so without consciously thinking I would put it into a novel.

Then, early in the summer of 2017, I was compelled by the voice of my protagonist, and her experiences and character came to me. I started writing down the thoughts and feelings I felt she would express, and this novel came into being."

== Reception ==
The Guardian said it was "An intelligent, insightful novel that asks vital questions about how we can begin to express trauma, and in what form". The reviewer does bring up some issues with the use of clichés and unrealistic dialogue. Kirkus Reviews stated that it was "Beautifully wrought even if marred by minor discrepancies." The New York Times noted that "This is not just good storytelling, but a blueprint for survival".
