= Little Chetco River =

- Location of the mouth of the Little Chetco River in Oregon

Location
- Country: United States
- State: Oregon
- County: Curry

Physical characteristics
- Source: Kalmiopsis Wilderness
  - location: Rogue River – Siskiyou National Forest, Klamath Mountains
  - coordinates: 42°09′41″N 123°49′20″W
  - elevation: 4,032 ft (1,229 m)
- Mouth: Chetco River
  - coordinates: 42°12′54″N 123°53′48″W
  - elevation: 1,841 ft (561 m)

The Little Chetco River is a tributary of the Chetco River in Curry County in the U.S. state of Oregon. Its headwaters lie in the Kalmiopsis Wilderness near the border with Josephine County west of Cave Junction. It flows generally northwest through the Rogue River – Siskiyou National Forest in the Klamath Mountains.

The named tributaries of the Little Chetco River are, from source to mouth, Hawk Creek, which enters from the left; Ditch and Copper creeks, which enter from the right, and Henry Creek, left.

Little Chetco Trail and other connecting trails maintained by the United States Forest Service pass through or near the Little Chetco River watershed. These include the Emily Cabin Trail, the Kalmiopsis Rim Trail, and the Bailey Cabin Trail.

== See also ==
- List of rivers of Oregon
