= Alfred A. Loeb State Park =

State park in Oregon, United States

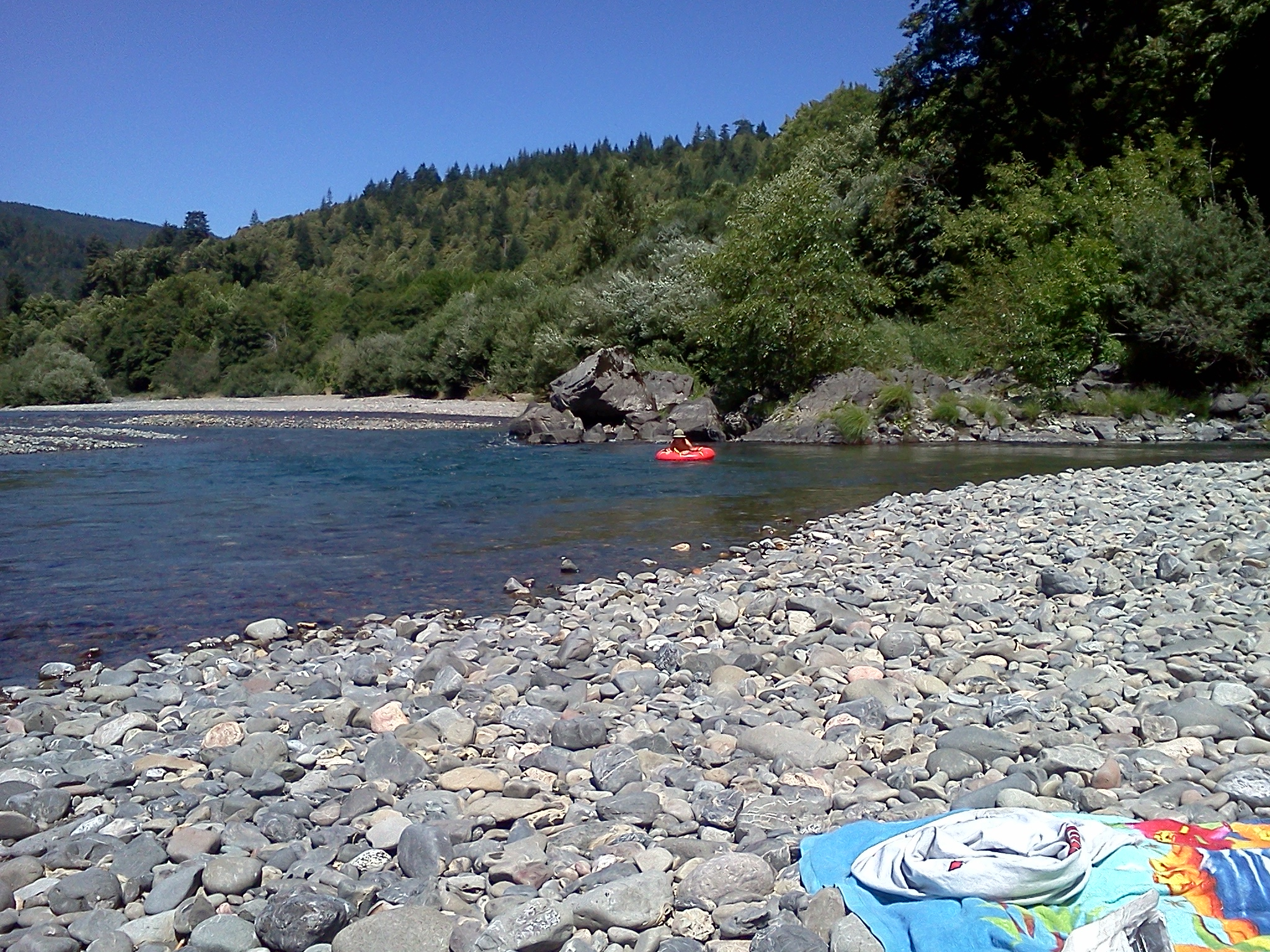
- Alfred A. Loeb State Park, August 2011

- Location within Oregon Location within the United States
- Interactive map of Alfred A. Loeb State Park
- Type: Public, state
- Location: Curry County, Oregon
- Nearest city: Brookings
- Coordinates: 42°06′46″N 124°11′22″W
- Operator: Oregon Parks and Recreation Department

Alfred A. Loeb State Park is a state park in the U.S. state of Oregon, administered by the Oregon Parks and Recreation Department. Located on the banks of the Chetco River, the park offers camping, hiking, fishing, swimming, and rafting opportunities. In the parks boundaries are 3 rental cabins, 53 camping sites, a launch area for drift boats, a day-use area, and the head of a 0.75-mile (1.2 km) trail that includes the northernmost coastal redwood grove in the United States.

== See also ==
- List of Oregon state parks
