= When Women Were Dragons =

2022 fantasy novel by Kelly Barnhill

- Author: Kelly Barnhill
- Publication date: May 3, 2022
- ISBN: 9780385548229

When Women Were Dragons is a 2022 fantasy novel by Kelly Barnhill. Kirkus Reviews named When Women Were Dragons one of the best science fiction and fantasy books of 2022.

The novel is set in the U.S. and imagines an alternative history where aggrieved and persecuted women are able to transform into dragons, culminating in the 1955 mass dragoning event in which many wives and mothers were transformed.

== Plot ==
In the 1950s Alexandra "Alex" Green, the only child of an absentee father and a stern housewife mother, grows up under the influence of her beloved aunt Marla. In 1955 Marla leaves Alex her texts and love letters between her and several women before disappearing during the mass dragoning event of 1955 in which women morphed into dragons.

Marla's daughter Beatrice is absorbed into the family and becomes Alex's sister with Alex's family, and the rest of the country, determined to pretend the dragoning never happened despite individual dragonings continuing to occur with regularity.

When Alex is 15 her mother dies from a recurrence of breast cancer. Her father immediately marries his secretary, whom he had been having an affair with, and moves Alex and Beatrice into a small apartment. Alex keeps the secret of their living conditions as long as her father continues to financially provide for her but learns that he intends to cut support as soon as she graduates from high school. While her father pushes her to join the workforce or marry, Alex, who is gifted in mathematics, is determined to go to college.

Shortly before Alex is due to graduate her aunt Marla, still in dragon form, reappears and her father dies. There is also a second mass dragoning of girls between the ages of 10 and 19. With more dragons choosing to stay with their families dragons become more commonly accepted.

Alex, while attending university, reluctantly gives Beatrice permission to fully dragon. Beatrice goes on to become a Nobel Peace Prize winner while Alex becomes a scientist.

== Reception ==
Kirkus praised the novel as "a complex, heartfelt story" and Locus Magazine called it a "frankly heroic story".
