= Chetco people =

Chetco
chit-dee-ni, chit-dee-ne, Chit-dv-ne
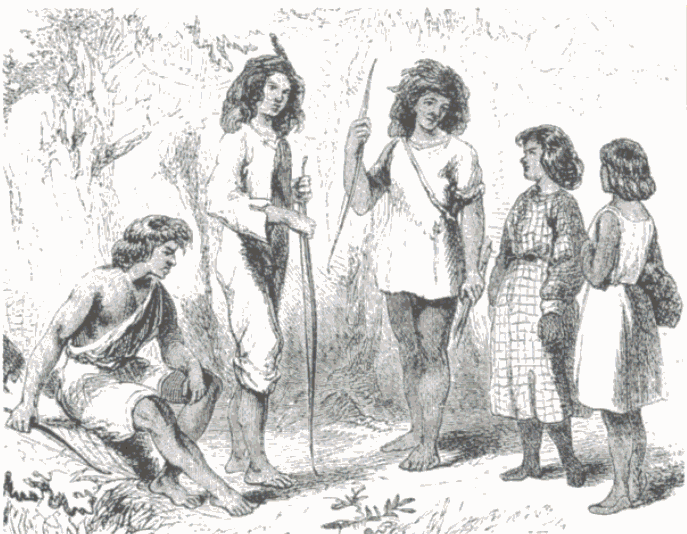
- Members of the Chectco tribe in 1856

Regions with significant populations
- lower Chetco River and Winchuck River in Curry County, Oregon

The Chetco (Chetco: chit-dee-ni, chit-dee-ne or Chit-dv-ne') are a tribe of Native Americans who originally lived along the lower Chetco River and Winchuck River in Curry County in the U.S. state of Oregon. The name Chetco comes from the word meaning "close to the mouth of the Chetco River" in their own language, which is part of the Athapascan languages. Although they were once one of the largest tribes on the Pacific coast of Oregon, "the last known full-blooded Chetco" living on the Chetco River (Lucy Dick) died in 1940.

Many of Lucy Dick's and Amelia Van Pelt's (Chetco/Tututni) descendants continue to live in the Chetco region, and are members of the Confederated Tribes of Siletz Indians. the Chetco people formerly lived in 9 associated villages, but after the Rogue River Wars in 1856, were removed to the Siletz Reservation and became part of the Confederated Tribes of Siletz Indians, living in one large village there. All of the Oregon Coast Tribes were removed to and confederated on the Siletz Reservation. Some Chetco descendants are enrolled in other federally recognized tribes, Cher-Ae Heights Indian Community of the Trinidad Rancheria, located in Humboldt County, California.

== Language and name ==
The Chetco language is a member of the Athapascan languages, which also includes most native languages in Alaska, the Apache and Navajo languages in the southwest United States, and the languages spoken by the Rogue River and Tolowa tribes in Oregon. The name "Chetco" comes from the word Chit-taa-ghii-li (or Chit) in their own language, meaning "close to the mouth of the Chetco River". The nine villages of the tribe on the Chit-see-ghii-li (Chetco River) were named Chettanne, Chettannene (twin villages at both sides of the mouth of the river), Khuniliikhwut (south side of Chetco River), Nakwutthume (Chetco River above all the other villages), Nukhwuchutun (Nukhsuchutun) (south side of Chetco River), Setthatun (south side of Chetco River), Siskhaslitun (south side of Chetco River), Tachukhaslitun (south side of Chetco River), and Thlcharghilitun (on the upper course of a south branch of Chetco River).

The endings "anne/nene/t̟ûn-nĕ" mean "inhabitants of a place/village" or "people"; a place/village site is designated as "dun". Other village names are also mentioned (sometimes they are identical - only in a modern transcription): Chit-dvn ("Chetco River Village"), Duu-srxuu-shi'n ("Winchuck River village"), Lhch'aa-ghii~-lii~-dvn ("Chetco River Forks Village"), Sri'-ch'as-lii~-dvn ("Village upriver from North Fork of the Chetco River"), T'uu-k'wvt ("Village near Gold Beach"), Yaa~-shuu-chit-yan'-ne ("Village at Gold Beach")

== History ==
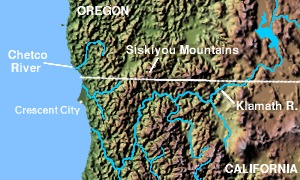
Map of southwest Oregon and northern California, showing the traditional homeland of the Chetco

The Chetco are believed to have come to coastal Oregon between 3000 and 1000 years ago. They had nine villages on the lower 14 miles (23 km) of the Chetco River, with their principal villages at the mouth, where the river flows into the Pacific Ocean. The Chetco territory extended a short distance on either side of the river, along the Pacific coast from Pistol River in the north to the Winchuck River in the south. They were the most populous of the 12 coastal tribes in southern Oregon.

The Chetco were hunter-gatherers with a diet based on hunting deer and elk, gathering acorns and mussels, and fishing. They used dugout canoes on the ocean and river and worked with stone tools. The Chetco cooked on open fires or with simple pots, and were culturally very similar to the Tolowa tribe to the south, "who shared the same customs regulating social relationships and frequently intermarried".

The tribe is thought to have had perhaps one thousand members at its peak, but its numbers declined after European-American settlers came into contact with the Chetco in the 19th century. Settlers destroyed the Chetco villages in 1853 and the surviving members of the tribe were forcibly removed to the Siletz Reservation in Tillamook County, Oregon (in 1879 the land the reservation is on became part of Lincoln County). In 1854 there were 241 members of the tribe on the reservation: 83 women, 117 men, and 41 children. By 1861 there were 262 on the reservation: 96 women, 62 men, and 104 children; by 1871 the total on the reservation had dropped to 63. Lucy Dick, who died in 1940 was "the last known full-blooded Chetco"; as of 2009.
