= Chetco Peak =

Mountain in Oregon, United States

- Location within Oregon Location within the United States

Highest point
- Elevation: 4,671 ft (1,424 m) NAVD 88
- Prominence: 1,107 ft (337 m)
- Coordinates: 42°08′10″N 123°56′33″W

Geography
- Location: Curry County, Oregon, U.S.
- Parent range: Klamath Mountains
- Topo map: USGS Chetco Peak

Chetco Peak is a mountain in the Klamath Mountains of southwestern Oregon in the United States. It is located in the southern Kalmiopsis Wilderness in southern Curry County in the extreme southwestern corner of the state, approximately 15 miles (24 km) inland from the Pacific Ocean and 10 miles (16 km) north of the California state line.

The name of the peak and that of the nearby Chetco River was derived from the name of a small tribe of Native Americans, the Chetco people, who originally lived along the lower Chetco River in Curry County.

== Climate ==
Climate data for Chetco Pek, California
Month	Jan	Feb	Mar	Apr	May	Jun	Jul	Aug	Sep	Oct	Nov	Dec	Year
Mean daily maximum °F (°C)	44.2 (6.8)	45.5 (7.5)	47.0 (8.3)	51.3 (10.7)	59.6 (15.3)	67.6 (19.8)	76.8 (24.9)	76.2 (24.6)	71.7 (22.1)	60.4 (15.8)	48.3 (9.1)	43.7 (6.5)	57.7 (14.3)
Mean daily minimum °F (°C)	30.9 (−0.6)	29.1 (−1.6)	28.8 (−1.8)	31.3 (−0.4)	36.8 (2.7)	41.5 (5.3)	50.2 (10.1)	50.0 (10.0)	47.1 (8.4)	40.8 (4.9)	32.9 (0.5)	29.2 (−1.6)	37.4 (3.0)
Average precipitation inches (mm)	24.55 (624)	20.17 (512)	21.19 (538)	15.21 (386)	10.26 (261)	4.38 (111)	1.12 (28)	1.40 (36)	2.80 (71)	11.95 (304)	20.86 (530)	32.64 (829)	166.53 (4,230)
Source: Prism
