= Le Petit Quotidien =

French daily newspaper for children

Le Petit Quotidien is a French daily newspaper for 6- to 10-year-old children. It was founded in 1998 by Play Bac Presse, on the model of Mon quotidien, a daily newspaper for 10- to 14-year-old children, which was launched in 1995. It is sold only by subscription.

The paper is published daily, Mondays to Saturdays. It consists of four pages for "ten minutes' daily reading" (French: 10 minutes de lecture par jour).

The publisher is Jérôme Saltet, editor-in-chief is François Dufour, two of the three people who set up Play Bac in 1985.

Play Bac Presse also publishes several special editions, each in a magazine format on a particular theme, such as animals, history, geography, science, English language. Each is in a magazine format of 50 illustrated pages. Games pages, with hidden answers, let the child check their knowledge.

In 1999, Le Petit Quotidien won the Grand Prix des Médias CB News for Best New Publication of the Year.

In 2020, the circulation of Le Petit Quotidien was of 51,326 copies.
