= Kelly Barnhill (author) =

American author

- Born: December 7, 1973 (age 52)
- Education: Minneapolis South High School; St. Catherine University
- Occupation: Author
- Notable work: The Girl Who Drank the Moon The Witch's Boy
- Spouse: Ted Barnhill
- Children: 3
- Awards: Newbery Medal; World Fantasy Award

Kelly Barnhill (born December 7, 1973) is an American author of children's literature, fantasy, and science fiction. Her novel The Girl Who Drank the Moon was awarded the 2017 Newbery Medal. Kirkus Reviews named When Women Were Dragons one of the best science fiction and fantasy books of 2022.

== Writing career ==
Many of Barnhill’s stories come from her experiences after being inspired by Fahrenheit 451 author Ray Bradbury and fairytales.

Barnhill says she was “lonely” and “socially awkward” at the middle school she attended until seventh grade. She never felt comfortable in her own skin and found herself in multiple bullying situations unable to stand up for herself in her self-conscious state. With the help of her mother, Barnhill was transferred to an all-girls Catholic school where she was taught by “go-getter” nuns. The feeling of insecurity led to her being bullied and to her transfer of schools which can be seen in her stories, like in When Women Were Dragons. In this particular novel, main character Alexandra “Alex” Green feels isolated from her classmates in her Catholic school because of her maturity and intelligence. At the new school, Alex finds herself exploring the idea of other sexualities, specifically with her interactions with her childhood friend, Sonja, who was torn away from her and later reconnected with her during a protest.

Barnhill learned about a powerful form of activism at her new school where the principal had walked hand-in-hand with Martin Luther King Jr., saying that ‘It was the first time I had seen that kind of activism that was part of everybody's story.’ Witnessing such a moment is also seen in When Women Were Dragons when women are said to turn into dragons and actively fight for an equal place in society among men. This process of women “dragoning” affects everyone in the novel, sparking an effort for a change in gender roles.

A specific scene featured in her novel The Girl Who Drank the Moon where a baby is being pried away from its mother was replicated after Barnhill herself worked in a battered women’s shelter. At this shelter, Barnhill witnessed a mother beg for help to cure her sick child after being denied medical treatment, going to show just how influential personal experiences are in the art of writing to convey messages and emotion.

Barnhill has received writing fellowships from the Jerome Foundation and the Minnesota State Arts Board and was a 2015 McKnight Writing Fellow in Children’s Literature. She is the winner of the Parents Choice Gold Award, the Texas Library Association Bluebonnet Award, and a Charlotte Huck Honor. She also was a finalist for the Minnesota Book Award, the Andre Norton Award, and the PEN/USA literary prize. In 2016, her novella The Unlicensed Magician received the World Fantasy Award for Long Fiction.

In 2017, her novel The Girl Who Drank the Moon was awarded the John Newbery Medal by the American Library Association.

Barnhill's books include The Unlicensed Magician, The Witch's Boy, Iron-Hearted Violet, The Mostly True Story of Jack, as well as several non-fiction titles for children.

In February 2019 Kelly was the Literary Guest of Honor and Keynote Speaker at the 37th annual Life, the Universe, & Everything professional science fiction and fantasy arts symposium.

== Personal life ==
Barnhill is a graduate of South High School in Minneapolis and St. Catherine University in St. Paul. Her husband, Ted Barnhill, is an architect. They have three children.

Before finding success as an author, Barnhill studied creative writing as an undergraduate, worked for the National Park Service, and was trained as a volunteer firefighter. She began writing short stories after the birth of her second child, and these stories were eventually expanded into full-length novels.

She lives in Minneapolis, Minnesota.

In 2021 she experienced a traumatic brain injury as a result of falling down stairs, which significantly affected her ability to write.

== Awards and honors ==
Kirkus Reviews named When Women Were Dragons one of the best science fiction and fantasy books of 2022.

Awards and honors for Barnhill's writing
Year	Title	Award	Result	Ref.
2012	Iron Hearted Violet	Andre Norton Award	Finalist	
2016	The Girl Who Drank the Moon	Andre Norton Award	Finalist	
2016	The Unlicensed Magician	World Fantasy Award	Winner	
2017	The Girl Who Drank the Moon	Locus Award for Best Young Adult Book	Finalist	
2017	The Girl Who Drank the Moon	Newbery Medal	Winner	
2017	The Girl Who Drank the Moon	NCTE Charlotte Huck Award	Honor	
2019	The Girl Who Drank the Moon	William Allen White Children's Book Award	Finalist	
2023	The Ogress and the Orphans	Mythopoeic Award	Winner	

== Publications ==
- The Mostly True Story of Jack (2011)
- Iron Hearted Violet, illustrated by Iacopo Bruno (2012)
- Mrs. Sorensen and the Sasquatch (2014)
- The Witch's Boy (2014)
- The Unlicensed Magician (2015)
- The Girl Who Drank the Moon (2016)
- Dreadful Young Ladies and Other Stories (2018)
- The Ogress and the Orphans (2022)
- When Women Were Dragons (2022)
- The Crane Husband (2023)
