= Pistol River State Scenic Viewpoint =

Oregon state park

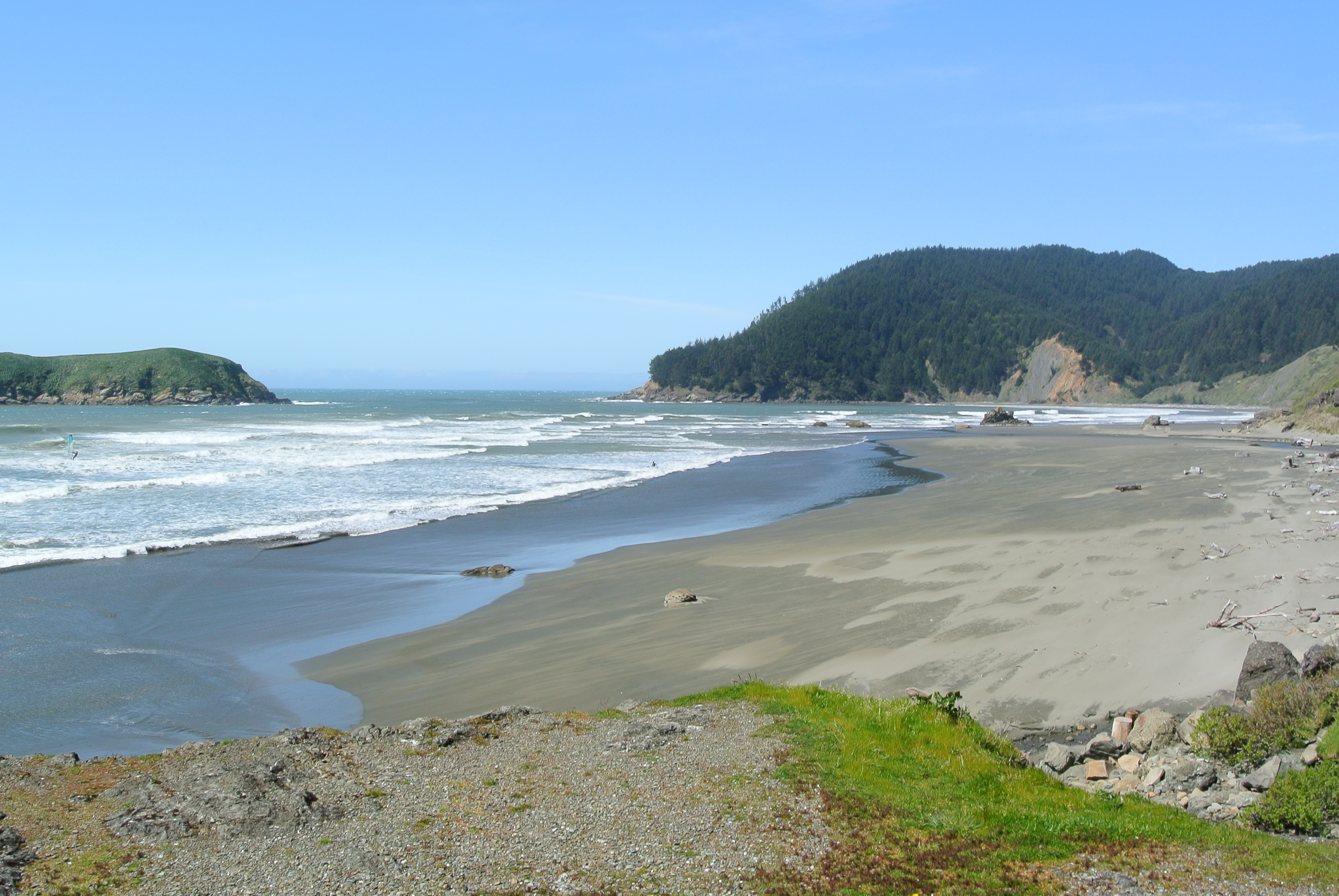
- Northern side of the park, looking north. Hunters Island on the left, Hunters Cove on the right.

- Location within Oregon Location within the United States
- Type: Public, state
- Location: Curry County, Oregon
- Nearest city: Gold Beach
- Coordinates: 42°16′29″N 124°24′19″W
- Operator: Oregon Parks and Recreation Department

Pistol River State Scenic Viewpoint is a state park in the U.S. state of Oregon, administered by the Oregon Parks and Recreation Department.

== See also ==
- List of Oregon state parks
