= The Girl Who Drank the Moon =

2016 children's book by Kelly Barnhill

- Author: Kelly Barnhill
- Audio read by: Christina Moore
- Publisher: Algonquin Young Readers
- Publication date: 9 August 2016
- Pages: 386
- Awards: Newbery Medal
- ISBN: 978-1-84812-647-3
- OCLC: 1001316782

The Girl Who Drank the Moon is a 2016 children's book by Kelly Barnhill. The book focuses on Luna, who after being raised by a witch named Xan, must figure out how to handle the magical powers she was accidentally given before it is too late. The book received the 2017 Newbery Medal.

Shortly before its release, a prequel short story was released online via Entertainment Weekly.

== Plot ==
Every year, the townspeople abandon the youngest baby in the forest as a "gift" for the witch Xan, whom they fear and believe to be the source of all evil. Instead, she takes the babies and gives them to another town, where the people raise them as their own. While doing the same to another baby girl, Xan accidentally feeds her moonlight instead of the starlight she normally feeds the babies, giving her magical powers which make her dangerous to others. Xan names the baby Luna and decides to raise her as her own child alongside the dragon Fyrian and the swamp monster Glerk. Xan is not a witch by birth, as she was an orphaned child who was found by a magician and raised with them; they experimented on her, causing her to become magical. One of the magicians, Zosimos, became a father figure and mentor to her. Xan, who grieved for her parents, learned to hide her grief from the Sorrow Eater, who sucked her grief and energy out of her. Xan is the only witch from that time to still be alive, along with Glerk, who is as old as the world, and Fyrian, whose mother is dead.

Over the years, Xan finds a way to seal Luna's magic away, but at a great cost: Luna cannot hear the word "magic", as she faints whenever she hears it, and her sealed magic, which will be released on her thirteenth birthday, will drain Xan’s magic and cause her to die. Meanwhile, a boy named Antain is deeply disturbed that his town sacrifices babies to the witch, having witnessed the despair of Luna's mother, who went insane after Luna was sacrificed to Xan. He is a member of the elder council, but loses his position because he never attempts the sacrifice ceremony again. One day, he decides to visit Luna's mother, who was locked away in a cell after she went insane and has gained magical abilities. During the visit, her magical paper birds attack Antain, leaving him scarred. He starts a job as a carpenter and soon meets a girl named Ethyne, on whom he has a crush. Ethyne is the only one who does not mind his scars, and they soon marry.

Xan gets weaker and weaker each year as Luna's thirteenth birthday approaches. Luna, who can communicate with a crow, and Xan occasionally travel to the city to see the people, but not to the town where babies are abandoned. When Xan rescues another baby, Antain, who has followed the procession, sees her, but the elder council does not believe him when he tells them about her. Ignatia, who possesses magic and is the leader of the Sisters, to which Ethyne once belonged, spies on Luna's mother, whose grief keeps her alive. Antain and Ethyne have since had a child that is to be sacrificed, but since they cannot bear to lose him, Antain decides to go to the forest and kill Xan. Ignatia, after talking with Antain's uncle who was also the grand elder of the council of elders named Gherland, follows him to kill Antain, so that he cannot tell the townspeople what he saw when they return. Luna's mother witnesses the conversation between Gherland, a member of the council, and Ignatia by transforming into a beetle.

While on the way to get the abandoned baby, Xan meets Antain, who accidentally wounds her, forcing her to travel with him. Luna discovers through a letter that Xan sealed her magic away and follows her with her crow along with Glerk and Fyrian, who unexpectedly starts to grow. Luna gets lost in the forest despite having a map she painted herself, which has the sentence "she is here, she is here, she is here", the same sentence her mother always mutters. While Antain and Xan, Ignatia, Luna and her group, and Luna's mother, who escaped from her cell the day Antain left, are in the forest, the cloud of grief that hung over the town and affected the mindset of the people, starts to vanish. This cleanses the people of their grief, causing them to ask questions and start having dreams of their children, who they presumed to be dead. Ethyne, who was once a member of the Sisters and loathes Ignatia, who loathes her in turn, starts a rebellion with help from the Sisters, who are her friends. The council members disapprove of this and send Gherland to talk to Ethyne, but she rebuffs him.

Luna soon meets with Ignatia and barely escapes with the help of Luna's mother's paper birds, which seem to know her. Xan learns the truth about why the townspeople abandon their youngest babies and feels immense guilt for being unable to see past the cloud of grief and not question the situation more. Luna's mother, whose paper birds carry her to the house of Glerk, Fyrian, Xan, and Luna, discovers magical shoes that give their wearer the ability to run fast. Ignatia soon meets Luna's mother and tries to reclaim the shoes from her, as they once belonged to her. However, Luna's mother escapes, and Luna soon meets Antain and Xan. Antain tries to attack her, but Luna stops him and discovers her true magical abilities in the process. Xan transforms back to being her real self, and Luna's mother and Ignatia meet them all. It is revealed that Ignatia needs people's grief to stay alive, which is why she did not help the magicians and witches during the volcanic eruption in the past and fed on Xan's grief. She then decided to become the unofficial leader of the town, where she has remained for centuries, spreading rumors about Xan and feeding off of people's grief after they lost their youngest children.

Meanwhile, Glerk tells Fyrian why he is small, speculating that it is because he was too close to his mother when she died in the volcano eruption centuries ago. Fyrian also learns of Ignatia and what she did centuries ago. Antain is scarred to learn that Ignatia is the true cause of the suffering, and Luna's mother supports Xan's accusations against Ignatia. It is revealed that the witch Xan hid her grief from was Ignatia; however, Ignatia had her own grief which hardened her heart, and so she needed the grief of others to survive. Fyrian tries to kill Ignatia for being responsible for his mother's death, but is stopped by Luna, Glerk and Xan. Suddenly, the volcano erupts again, and it is revealed that the witches, magicians and dragons sealed the volcano many years ago. This time, instead of sealing it, they let it erupt, protecting the towns by making bubbles that protect them and their people. After this, Gherland is put in prison, while Ignatia and Xan are in a hospital as they are both dying. Luna asks the townspeople for her mother's name, and her name is revealed to be Adara. Xan dies peacefully, and Glerk travels with her to the swamp. Luna and Fyrian grieve for Xan. Antain and Ethyne, who allow Luna and Adara to stay with them, support the townspeople. Luna travels with Fyrian to other cities to tell them the truth about Xan. The story ends with Luna discovering a poem from Glerk, which he had written for her as he left for the swamp, as the paper the poem was written on becomes a bird and flies into the sky.

== Reception ==
The book was favorably reviewed. Common Sense Media gave it 5 stars and an A+ for educational value, cited its positive message and role models calling it, "A great choice for middle-grade fantasy lovers." Diana Wagman writing for the New York Times also compliments the book for its ability to impart lessons in an engaging manner, "The young reader who devours it now just for fun will remember its lessons for years to come."

The book won the 2017 Newbery Medal, much to the surprise of Barnhill, who did not think anyone would like it.

In October 25, 2016, 20th Century Fox Animation picked up the rights for a live-action/animated freature film with Marc Haimes, writer of Kubo and the Two Strings, to penn the screenplay while Maresa Pullman and Rio director Carlos Saldanha to produce under their company banner BottleCap Productions. As of 2026, no word about the film’s development so far.

Awards
Preceded by Last Stop on Market Street	Newbery Medal recipient 2017	Succeeded by Hello, Universe
