= Brain Quest =

Educational flashcards

Brain Quest is a series of educational flashcards that quiz children on a variety of subjects including science, math, English, geography, history, and others.

== Versions ==
The product was created by French company Play Bac and was named Les P'tits Incollables (now known as Les Incollables). The English version was named Brain Quest and licensed to Workman Publishing. It sold 4.2 million copies in its first 16 months and made The New York Times Best Seller list for children's books.

Brain Quest is primarily intended for school children from grades 1 through 7, but some card sets are geared towards younger children.

== Rock Flipper ==
The Rock Flipper game allows two people to participate at the same time. One player is tasked with reading the question and withholding the answer from the opponent. Although slightly competitive, there is no scoring system for the game, making it more family-friendly and focused on learning.

== Turbo Twist ==
LeapFrog Enterprises designed and released a special Turbo Twist handheld toy that is based on the Brain Quest license. It features voice acting for the franchise's characters Jason and Anna, as well as their dog, BQ. Similar to the original flashcard product, the player must answer multiple-choice questions based on science, social studies, and/or language arts by "Twisting" the end of the unit to select answers and "Slamming" a button to choose the correct one when it is displayed. The player can choose from ten levels of difficulty and also encounter questions from all three categories, called the "Grab Bag", like in the original flash card game.
