= Harbor, Oregon =

Unincorporated community in the state of Oregon, United States

- Census-designated place
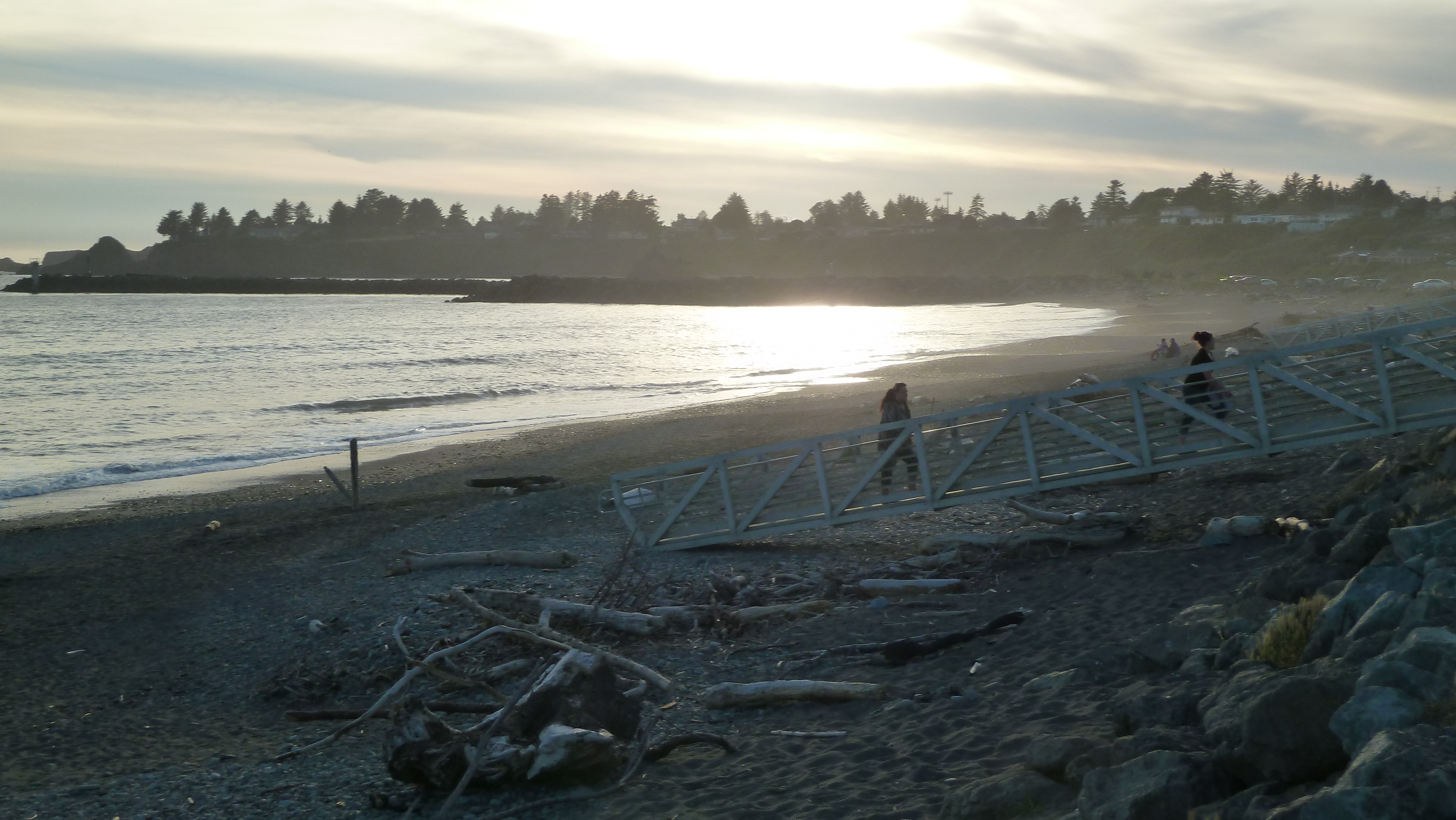
- The beach at Harbor

- Location of Harbor, Oregon

- Location in the United States
- Coordinates: 42°02′17″N 124°15′10″W
- Country: United States
- State: Oregon
- County: Curry
- Founded: 1894

Area
  - Total: 2.31 sq mi (5.98 km^{2})
  - Land: 1.92 sq mi (4.97 km^{2})
  - Water: 0.39 sq mi (1.01 km^{2})
- Elevation: 115 ft (35 m)

Population (2020)
  - Total: 2,551
  - Density: 1,328.3/sq mi (512.86/km^{2})
- Time zone: UTC−8 (Pacific (PST))
  - Summer (DST): UTC−7 (PDT)
- ZIP code: 97415
- Area codes: 458 and 541
- FIPS code: 41-32100
- GNIS feature ID: 2408351

Harbor (Tolowa: chit) is an unincorporated community in Curry County, Oregon, United States. It is located across the Chetco River from the city of Brookings. For statistical purposes, the United States Census Bureau has defined Harbor as a census-designated place (CDP). The census definition of the area may not precisely correspond to local understanding of the area with the same name. As of the 2020 census, Harbor had a population of 2,551.

== History ==
The original name of the post office in the area was "Chetco", after the Chetco River. It was established in 1863 and moved several times until it closed in 1910. Meanwhile, a new post office named Harbor was established at the mouth of the Chetco River in 1894. The name of the office may have originated from the Chetco Harbor Land and Townsite Company.

== Geography ==
Harbor is located in southwestern Curry County along U.S. Route 101, 1 mile (1.6 km) east of the center of Brookings and 5 miles (8 km) north of the California state line. According to the United States Census Bureau, the CDP has a total area of 2.3 square miles (6.0 km^{2}), of which 1.9 square miles (5.0 km^{2}) is land and 0.39 square miles (1.0 km^{2}), or 16.88%, is water.

== Climate ==
Harbor, like the Brookings area, has a cool-summer Mediterranean climate (Köppen climate classification Csb). According to the Trewartha climate classification, it has a subtropical climate (despite being a little farther north than Chicago in latitude) and is one of the northernmost North American locations to have one.

It has cool winters during which intense rainfall is broken by weeks of cool, sunny weather. Mild, dry summers with average rainfall in July and August of less than 1 inch (25 mm) per month are usual. There are an average of only two afternoons annually with high temperatures of 90 °F (32.2 °C) or higher and an average of 1.5 mornings with low temperatures of 32 °F (0 °C) or lower. The record high temperature was 108.2 °F (42.3 °C) on July 9, 2008. The record low temperature was 18 °F (−7.8 °C) on December 8, 1972.

The wettest “rain year” in Harbor was from July 1937 to June 1938 with 107.62 inches (2,733.5 mm) and the driest from July 1976 to June 1977 with 40.30 inches (1,023.6 mm), although as much as 123.90 inches (3,147.1 mm) fell during calendar year 1996. The most rainfall in one month was 36.90 inches (937.3 mm) in December 1996. The most rainfall in 24 hours was 17.00 inches (431.8 mm) on October 14, 2016. Snow is rarer, but not unusual in Harbor, averaging only 0.7 inches or 0.018 metres per year.

Because of its location, Harbor is subject to winter (and less frequently summer) temperatures considered unusually warm for the Oregon Coast or for that matter, the North Coast of California. Temperatures can reach 70 to 100 °F (21.1 to 37.8 °C) throughout the year. This is due mostly to its situation at the foot of the Klamath Mountains, from which winds compress and warm the air flowing onto Harbor. This is called the Brookings effect or Chetco effect, similar to the warm dry Santa Ana winds of coastal Southern California. Daffodils and other bulbs generally bloom in February. In the lowlands, heavy fog is common in the summer while the coastal hills are generally sunny and cool.

Climate data for Harbor at Brookings, OR (1981–2010 normals, extremes 1913–present)
Month	Jan	Feb	Mar	Apr	May	Jun	Jul	Aug	Sep	Oct	Nov	Dec	Year
Record high °F (°C)	80 (27)	83 (28)	88 (31)	92 (33)	99 (37)	100 (38)	102 (39)	101 (38)	101 (38)	101 (38)	88 (31)	79 (26)	102 (39)
Mean maximum °F (°C)	66.1 (18.9)	70.0 (21.1)	71.0 (21.7)	74.3 (23.5)	79.4 (26.3)	83.2 (28.4)	83.4 (28.6)	82.7 (28.2)	89.0 (31.7)	83.2 (28.4)	69.0 (20.6)	64.9 (18.3)	92.4 (33.6)
Mean daily maximum °F (°C)	55.4 (13.0)	56.8 (13.8)	57.9 (14.4)	59.9 (15.5)	64.0 (17.8)	67.1 (19.5)	68.7 (20.4)	68.2 (20.1)	68.6 (20.3)	65.0 (18.3)	58.1 (14.5)	54.8 (12.7)	62.1 (16.7)
Daily mean °F (°C)	48.8 (9.3)	49.4 (9.7)	50.0 (10.0)	51.6 (10.9)	55.3 (12.9)	58.3 (14.6)	60.2 (15.7)	60.2 (15.7)	59.7 (15.4)	56.2 (13.4)	51.1 (10.6)	48.1 (8.9)	54.2 (12.3)
Mean daily minimum °F (°C)	42.1 (5.6)	42.1 (5.6)	42.1 (5.6)	43.3 (6.3)	46.6 (8.1)	49.5 (9.7)	51.7 (10.9)	52.3 (11.3)	50.7 (10.4)	47.6 (8.7)	44.1 (6.7)	41.3 (5.2)	46.2 (7.9)
Mean minimum °F (°C)	33.8 (1.0)	34.0 (1.1)	34.3 (1.3)	35.7 (2.1)	39.3 (4.1)	43.8 (6.6)	46.8 (8.2)	46.7 (8.2)	44.2 (6.8)	40.3 (4.6)	34.8 (1.6)	32.7 (0.4)	30.0 (−1.1)
Record low °F (°C)	21 (−6)	24 (−4)	29 (−2)	28 (−2)	32 (0)	34 (1)	39 (4)	37 (3)	34 (1)	24 (−4)	25 (−4)	18 (−8)	18 (−8)
Average precipitation inches (mm)	12.07 (307)	10.14 (258)	9.47 (241)	6.51 (165)	4.04 (103)	1.99 (51)	0.52 (13)	1.01 (26)	1.63 (41)	5.40 (137)	11.77 (299)	14.19 (360)	78.89 (2,004)
Average precipitation days (≥ 0.01 in.)	17.3	15.0	17.2	13.9	8.9	5.4	2.7	3.2	4.3	9.2	17.4	18.2	142.5
Mean monthly sunshine hours	150	139	199	258	320	331	370	367	301	195	164	154	2,948
Source 1:
Source 2: Worldweatheronline (sun)

== Demographics ==
Historical population
Census	Pop.	Note	%±
2020	2,551		—
U.S. Decennial Census

As of the census of 2000, there were 2,622 people, 1,333 households, and 798 families residing in the CDP. The population density was 1,399.6 inhabitants per square mile (540.4/km^{2}). There were 1,691 housing units at an average density of 902.6 per square mile (348.5/km^{2}). The racial makeup of the CDP was 94.20% White, 0.34% African American, 2.17% Native American, 0.19% Asian, 0.08% Pacific Islander, 0.92% from other races, and 2.10% from two or more races. Hispanic or Latino of any race were 3.05% of the population.

There were 1,333 households, out of which 11.0% had children under the age of 18 living with them, 52.6% were married couples living together, 5.6% had a female householder with no husband present, and 40.1% were non-families. 34.4% of all households were made up of individuals, and 18.6% had someone living alone who was 65 years of age or older. The average household size was 1.93 and the average family size was 2.41.

In the CDP, the population was spread out, with 11.5% under the age of 18, 4.1% from 18 to 24, 15.0% from 25 to 44, 28.5% from 45 to 64, and 40.9% who were 65 years of age or older. The median age was 60 years. For every 100 females, there were 97.3 males. For every 100 females age 18 and over, there were 96.0 males.

The median income for a household in the CDP was $22,829, and the median income for a family was $30,171. Males had a median income of $23,295 versus $21,692 for females. The per capita income for the CDP was $16,318. About 11.1% of families and 14.8% of the population were below the poverty line, including 15.9% of those under age 18 and 14.3% of those age 65 or over.
