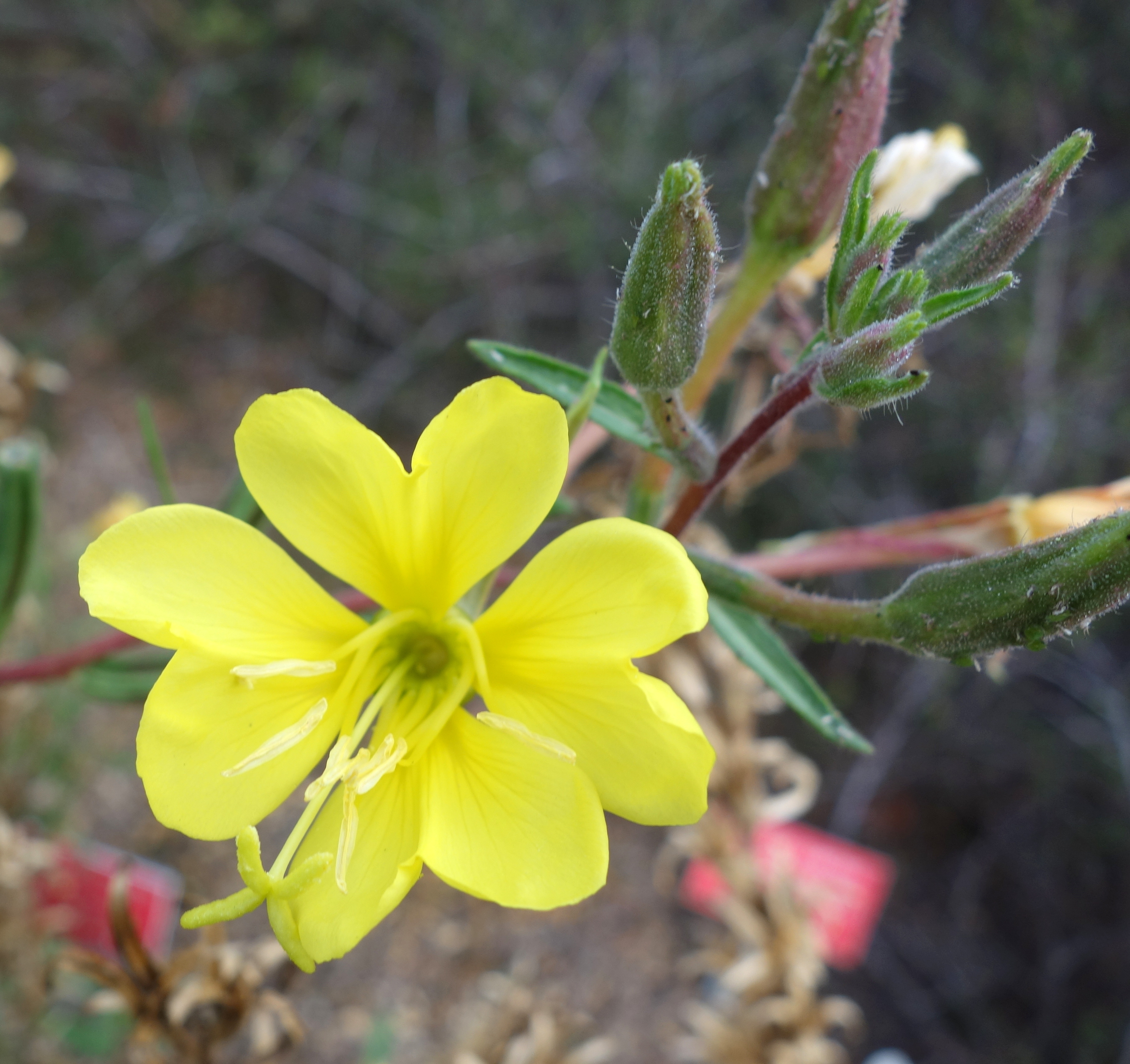

Conservation status
- Imperiled (NatureServe)

Scientific classification
- Kingdom: Plantae
- Clade: Tracheophytes
- Clade: Angiosperms
- Clade: Eudicots
- Clade: Rosids
- Order: Myrtales
- Family: Onagraceae
- Genus: Oenothera
- Species: O. wolfii

Binomial name
- Oenothera wolfii (Munz) P.H.Raven, W.Dietr. & Stubbe

= Oenothera wolfii =

Species of flowering plant

Oenothera wolfii is a rare species of flowering plant in the evening primrose family known by the common name Wolf's evening primrose. It is native to the coastline of southern Oregon and northern California, where it grows in coastal prairie, dunes, and coastal forest and woodland habitat. As of 1997 it was known from only about 16 occurrences. The biggest threat to the plant is its easy hybridization with its relative and probable descendant, Oenothera glazioviana. As this rare wild plant crosses with the introduced garden escapee, introgression occurs, causing what is known as genetic pollution; fewer pure individuals of O. wolfii will be seen as they are outnumbered by hybrids.

Oenothera wolfii is a hairy biennial herb producing a dense rosette of leaves and an erect stem up to a meter tall. The wavy or toothed leaves are up to 18 centimeters long. In its second year the plant produces an inflorescence, a spike of showy yellow flowers with petals one or two centimeters long. The fruit is a capsule which may be almost 5 centimeters in length.
