= Pistol River =

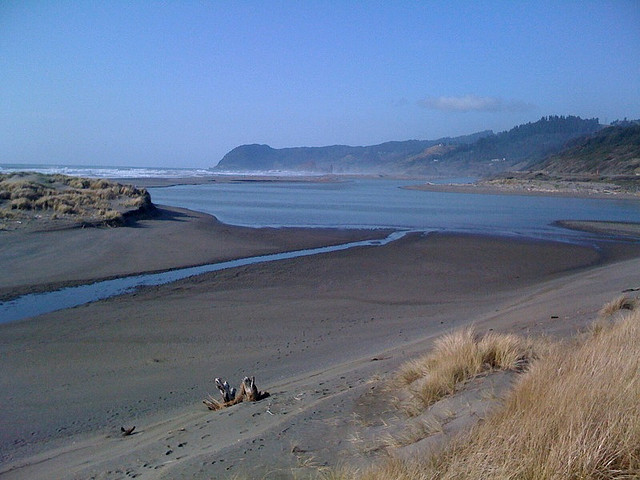
- At the river mouth

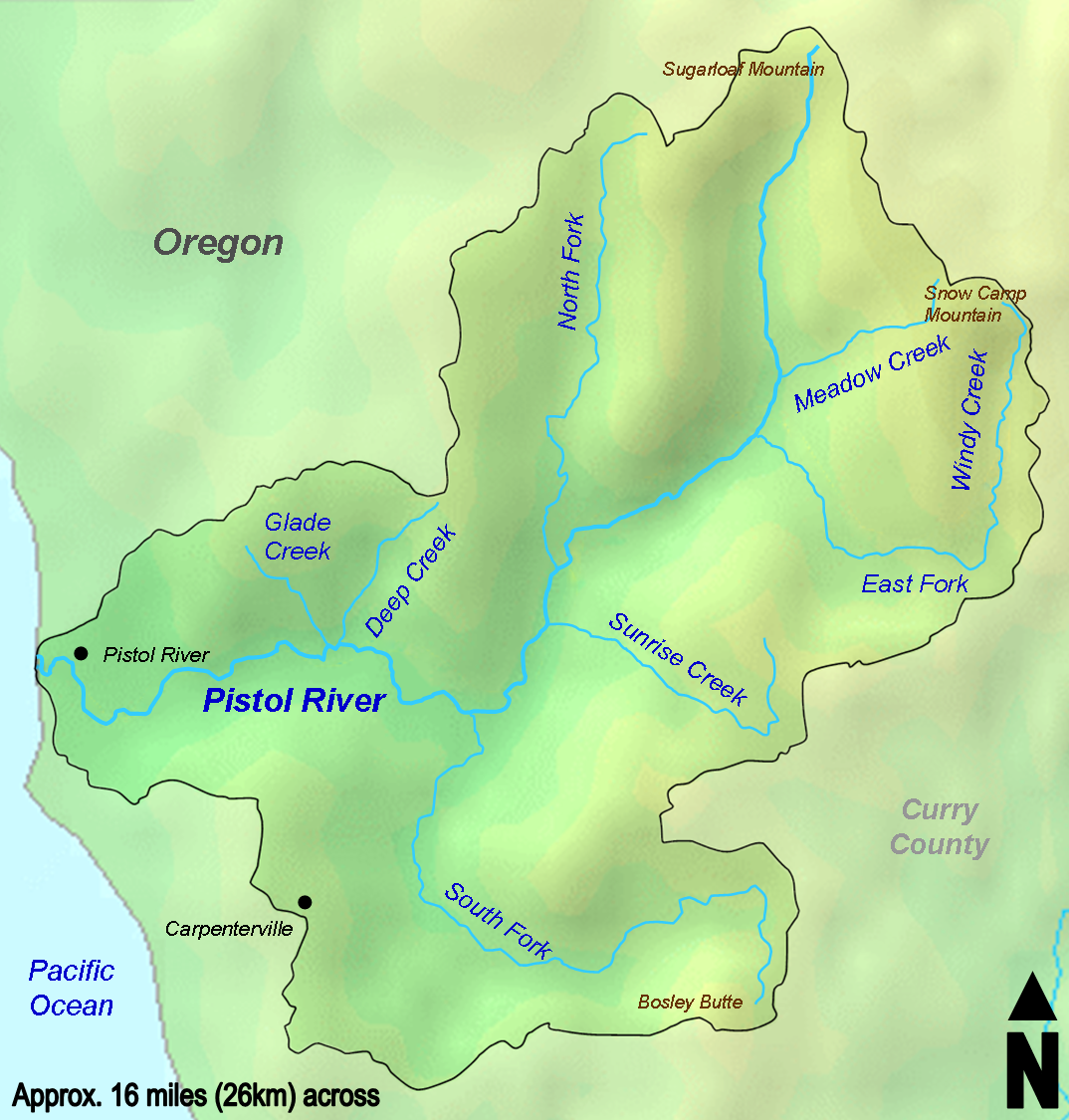
- The Pistol River watershed

- Location of the mouth of the Pistol River in Oregon
- Etymology: A pistol lost in the river in 1853

Location
- Country: United States
- State: Oregon
- County: Curry

Physical characteristics
- Source: near Sugarloaf Mountain
  - location: Siskiyou National Forest, Southern Oregon Coast Range
  - coordinates: 42°24′10″N 124°12′25″W
  - elevation: 3,179 ft (969 m)
- Mouth: Pacific Ocean
  - location: Pistol River State Scenic Viewpoint, near Pistol River
  - coordinates: 42°16′46″N 124°24′27″W
  - elevation: 7 ft (2.1 m)
- Length: 21 mi (34 km)
- Basin size: 105.1 sq mi (272 km^{2})
- Discharge
  - minimum: 1 cu ft/s (0.028 m^{3}/s)

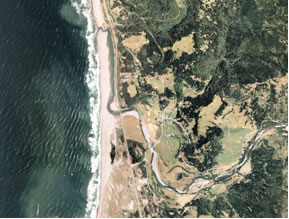
Pistol river mouth seen from space

The Pistol River is a coastal stream that meanders for 21 miles (34 km) through the Southern Oregon Coast Range to the Pacific Ocean near the unincorporated community of Pistol River in the U.S. state of Oregon. Flowing generally southwest from its origin near Sugarloaf Mountain in the Siskiyou National Forest, the river enters the sea at Pistol River State Scenic Viewpoint, 10 miles (16 km) south of Gold Beach. The river received its name after pioneer James Mace lost his pistol in it in 1853.

The Pistol River supports populations of chinook salmon, threatened coho salmon, steelhead, and coastal cutthroat trout. The river flows generally through forests where logging has damaged the fish habitat. Work to restore the habitat is ongoing.

== Course ==
From its headwaters in the forest, the river flows south at first, receiving Meadow Creek from the left and then the East Fork Pistol River, also from the left. Turning southwest, it receives the North Fork Pistol River from the right and Sunrise Creek from the left about 11 miles (18 km) from the mouth before turning west toward the ocean. South Fork Pistol River enters from the left, then Deep Creek and Glade Creek, both from the right about 5 miles (8 km) from the mouth. Crook Creek enters from the right at the community of Pistol River, where the river passes under Pistol River Loop Highway and then U.S. Route 101 before entering the Pacific Ocean at Pistol River State Scenic Viewpoint.

== Watershed ==
The Pistol River's watershed encompasses approximately 105 square miles (272 km^{2}) of Curry County. As of 2001, about 57 percent of the basin was public land managed by the United States Forest Service (52 percent) and the Bureau of Land Management (5 percent). About 43 percent of the basin was privately owned. Forestry, whether public or private, was the dominant land use, involving 97 percent of the watershed. The remaining 3 percent was used for farming, livestock grazing, and rural homes.

== See also ==
- List of rivers of Oregon

== Works cited ==
- McArthur, Lewis A.; McArthur, Lewis L. (2003) [1928]. Oregon Geographic Names (7th ed.). Portland, Oregon: Oregon Historical Society Press. ISBN 978-0875952772.
- McGuire, Mike (2001). "Pistol River Watershed Assessment" (PDF). Curry Watersheds.
- Sheehan, Madelynne Diness (2005). Fishing in Oregon: The Complete Oregon Fishing Guide (10th ed.). Scappoose, Oregon: Flying Pencil Publications. ISBN 978-0-916473-15-0. OCLC 60631276.
