= Natasha Pickowicz =

American pastry chef and cookbook author (born 1984)

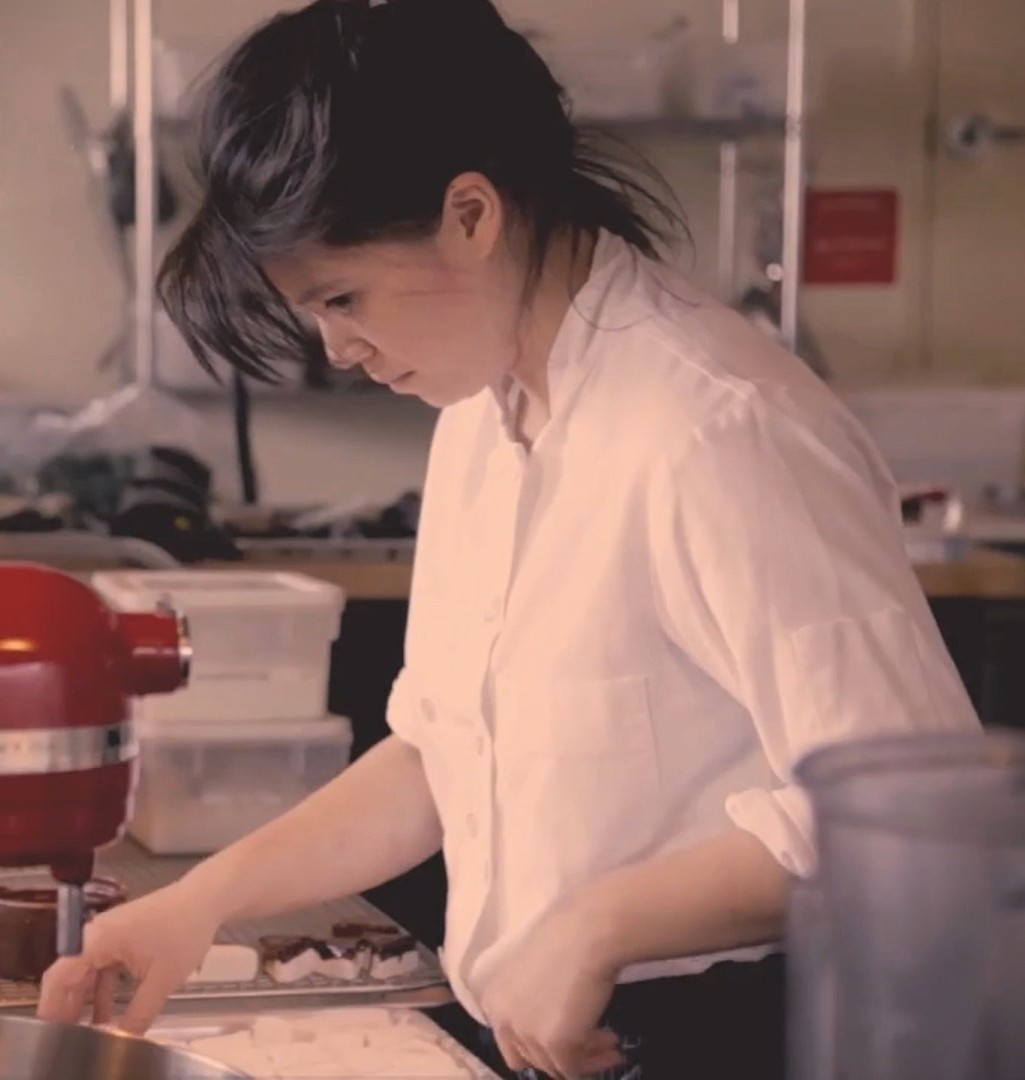
- Pickowicz working in 2017
- Born: 1984 (age 41–42); San Diego, California, US
- Education: Cornell University (B.A.)
- Culinary career
- Previous restaurant(s): Flora Bar at the Met Breuer, Altro Paradiso
- Awards won: Nomination: James Beard Award for Best Book (Baking and Desserts) (2024); New York Times Best Cookbooks (2023); Nomination: James Beard Award for Outstanding Pastry Chef (2020); Semifinalist: James Beard Award for Outstanding Pastry Chef (2019); Semifinalist: James Beard Award for Outstanding Pastry Chef (2018)

Natasha Pickowicz (born 1984) is an American pastry chef, activist, and cookbook author. She served as Head Pastry Chef at Matter House, which ran three New York restaurants (Flora Bar, Altro Paradiso, and Estela) simultaneously, before being furloughed during the COVID-19 pandemic. She has written and published two cookbooks: More Than Cake, a New York Times Best Cookbook, in 2023, and Everyone Hot Pot in 2026. She is also widely recognized for her charity bake sales.

== Biography ==
Pickowicz was raised in San Diego to a Chinese mother and an Irish-Ukrainian-American father, both academics who taught at the University of California, San Diego. She studied Scottish Literature at Cornell and, after moving to Montreal, intended to go for a PhD in ethnomusicology but was rejected by all the local graduate schools. She worked under the table as a baker at a local restaurant called Dépanneur La Pick Up after claiming she had experience while serving as a newspaper arts and entertainment editor, and soon pivoted to food writing and baking at Lawrence Restaurant.

She moved back to New York and worked at Marlow and Sons before becoming Head Pastry Chef at Matter House and their restaurants, Flora Bar, Altro Paradiso, and Estela. She was furloughed during the COVID-19 pandemic and since then has run a baking pop-up series called Never Ending Taste. She also ran a hot pot pop-up.

She ran her first charity bake sale in 2017, after the first inauguration of Donald Trump, and fundraised for Planned Parenthood of New York. She created a second in 2018, raising US$20,000 for Planned Parenthood, and a third in 2019. She has since ran many bake sales, including one in June 2022 fundraising for abortion care and one in October 2025 fundraising for food insecurity and systems and immigrants' rights. These bake sales have raised over $200,000 for charities.

She was a semifinalist for Outstanding Pastry Chef in the James Beard Foundation Awards in 2018 and 2019 and a nominee for the same award in 2020.

In 2023, she wrote her first cookbook, More Than Cake, which was baking-focused. It was named as one of the New York Times Best Cookbooks of the year in 2023 and was nominated for Best Book (Baking and Desserts) in the 2024 James Beard Awards. Her second book, Everyone Hot Pot, which focuses on hot pot, was published in 2026.
