= Workman Publishing Company =

American book publishing company

- Parent company: Hachette Book Group
- Status: Active
- Founded: 1968; 58 years ago
- Founder: Peter Workman
- Country of origin: United States
- Headquarters location: 225 Varick Street; New York City, New York
- Distribution: Self-distributed (US); Thomas Allen & Son (CA); Melia Publishing Services (UK); Hardie Grant (AU books); BrownTrout Publishers (AU calendars); Bookreps NZ (NZ); Real Books (SA)
- Publication types: Books, calendars
- Imprints: Artisan; Algonquin; Algonquin Young Readers; Storey; Timber
- Official website: workman.com

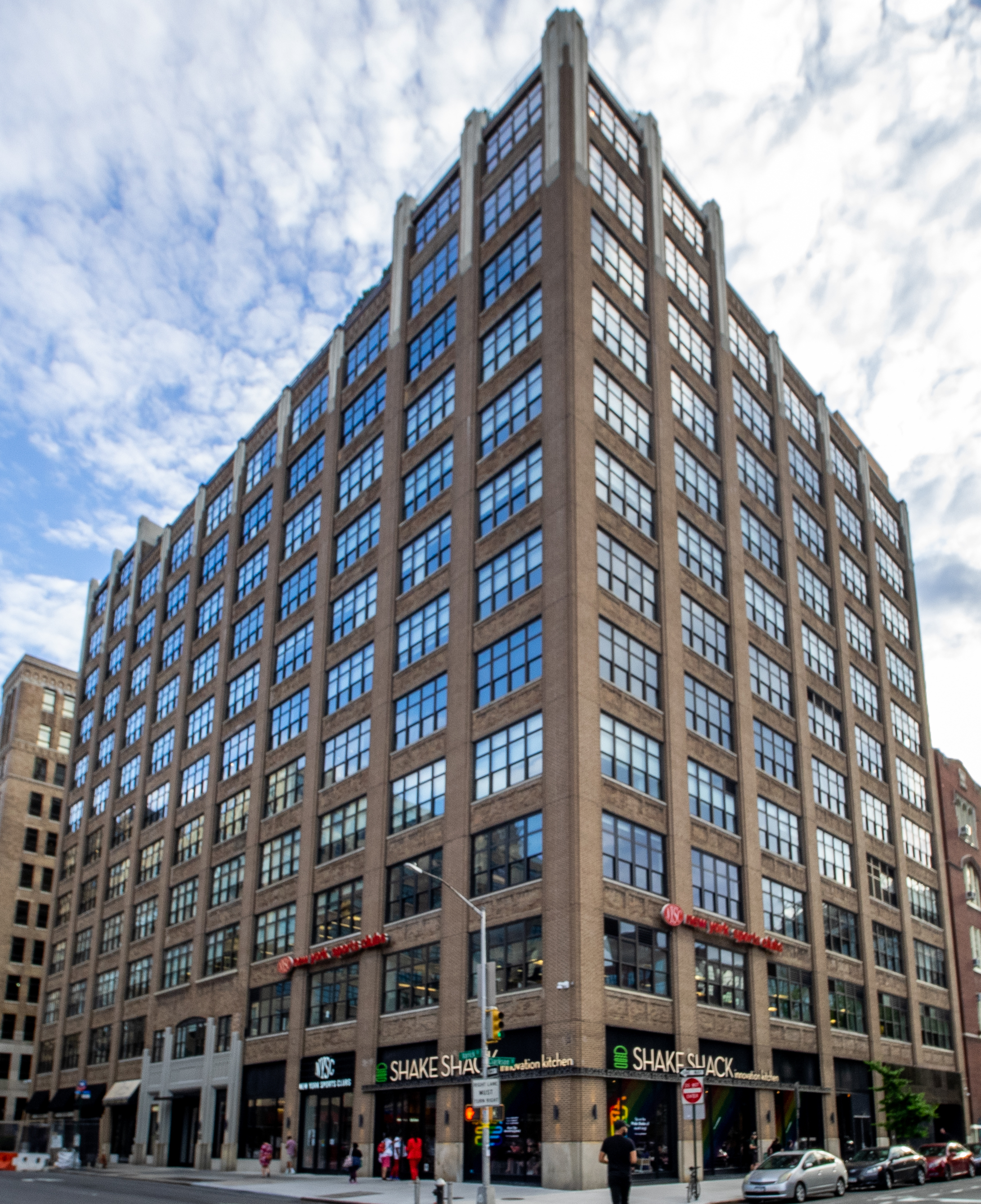
225 Varick Street in New York City, New York, the headquarters of Workman Publishing Company

Workman Publishing Company, Inc., is an American publisher of trade books founded by Peter Workman. The company consists of imprints Workman, Workman Children's, Workman Calendars, Artisan, Algonquin Books of Chapel Hill and Algonquin Young Readers, Storey Publishing, and Timber Press.

From the beginning Workman focused on publishing adult and children's non-fiction, and its titles and brands rank among the best-known in their fields, including: the What to Expect pregnancy and childcare guide; the educational series, Brain Quest and The Big Fat Notebooks; travel books like 1,000 Places to See Before You Die and Atlas Obscura; humor including The Official Preppy Handbook and Bad Cat; award-winning cookbooks: The Noma Guide to Fermentation, The French Laundry Cookbook, Sheet Pan Suppers, The Silver Palate Cookbook, The Barbecue Bible; and novels including How the Garcia Girls Lost Their Accents, Water for Elephants and the Young Adult Newberry Medalist, The Girl Who Drank the Moon. Workman also publishes calendars, including The Original Page-a-Day Calendars.

After over 50 years as an independent, family-owned company, Workman Publishing Company, Inc., joined The Hachette Book Group in 2021. Its primary offices are in New York City.

== History ==
After a short stint packaging books for Ballantine, Peter Workman founded Workman Publishing with his wife, Carolan, in 1968. The first book published under the Workman imprint was Richard Hittelman's 28-Day Yoga Exercise Plan, which is still in print. In 1975 Workman published its first New York Times bestseller, B. Kliban's Cat, a collection of humorous illustrations that also inspired the company expand into calendar publishing with Cat as its first wall calendar. In 1979, Workman's creative director, Paul Hanson, created the Page-a-Day Calendar. In the years since, Page-a-Day Calendars have shipped over 100 million copies.

Since then, a succession of titles have had strong sales and strong cultural impact, beginning in with The Official Preppy Handbook (1980) and continuing with In and Out of the Garden (1981), The Silver Palate Cookbook (1982), What to Expect When You’re Expecting (1984), The Book of Questions (1987), All I Need to Know I Learned from My Cat (1990), Good Omens (1990, the first and only novel published under the Workman imprint), Brain Quest (1992), Boynton On Board board books (1993), Shoes (1996), Fandex (1998), The Cake Mix Doctor (1999), How to Grill (2001), 1,000 Places to See Before You Die and Stitch N Bitch (2003), Gallop! (2007), Indestructibles (2009), Safari and Steal Like an Artist (2012), and a trifecta in 2016, including the launch of two brands—The Big Fat Notebooks and Paint by Sticker—and Atlas Obscura.

Throughout its history, Workman has specialized in quirky but useful books, often with unusual formats. It published its first “book-plus” in 1983: How to Kazoo came with a real kazoo. Among its million-copy children's bestsellers are The Bug and Bug Bottle—the book came in a collecting bottle—and The Kids’ Book of Chess which came with a full chess set. The Brain Quest brand started with two decks of grommeted cards sold in a box. Indestructibles books are printed on a Tyvek-like paper that makes them rip-proof, chew-proof, washable and 100% non-toxic. The multi-million copy Scanimation and Photicular brands both have pages with moving images. In 2020, Workman and its imprints expanded into the jigsaw puzzle business.

For years Workman's unofficial motto was "no book before its time", which reflected Peter Workman's obsession with getting every part of a book right before sending it out into the world. It's part of the reason that one out of three Workman books have over 100,000 copies in print, and that approximately 80% of its business is "backlist"—sales generated by books that stay in print for years. Peter Workman died in 2013. In 2015, Workman appointed Dan Reynolds, former President and Publisher of Storey Publishing, as its new President and CEO. In September, 2021, Carolan Workman sold the company to the Hachette Book Group.

== Imprints and distribution ==
=== Imprints ===
Artisan

In 1994 Peter Workman founded his second company, Artisan, with the mission to publish subjects that can best be expressed visually, whether through photography, illustration, or graphic design. The company focuses on cooking, design, crafts and hobbies, and expanding the boundaries of general nonfiction. It seeks out authors who are thought-leaders and tastemakers, and works hand-in-hand with them to create physical books that are beautiful in their own right. Artisan's first significant bestseller was Thomas Keller's The French Laundry Cookbook, and recent New York Times bestsellers include The Noma Guide to Fermentation, Grace Bonney's In the Company of Women, John Derian Picture Book, The Dogist, The Kinfolk Home, and The New Health Rules. Other notable authors include Sean Brock, Natasha Pickowicz, Cheryl Day, Joshua McFadden, Lucinda Scala Quinn, Einat Admony, David Tanis, and Naomi Duguid.

Algonquin

Algonquin Books was founded in Chapel Hill, North Carolina, in 1983 with a goal of publishing quality fiction and nonfiction by unpublished young writers. Although it started as a small Southern house, over the years it has garnered national attention for a diverse range of renowned authors, including Julia Alvarez, Kaye Gibbons, Chimamanda Adichie, Robert Morgan, Lee Smith, Tayari Jones, Kaitlyn Greenidge, Daniel Wallace, and Amy Stewart, among others. In 1989, Algonquin was acquired by Workman Publishing. Today, it has offices in New York City and Chapel Hill and its numerous bestsellers and prizewinners include Water for Elephants, A Reliable Wife, Love, Loss, and What I Wore, Big Fish, Last Child in the Woods, The Leavers, In the Time of the Butterflies, An American Marriage, Dan Rather's What Unites Us, and The Book of Delights. Algonquin also publishes the PEN/Bellwether Prize for Socially Engaged Fiction, a biannual prize established by author Barbara Kingsolver whose winners include Hillary Jordan's Mudbound, Heidi Durrow's The Girl Who Fell from the Sky, Lisa Ko’s The Leavers, Katharine Seligman's At the Edge of the Haight, and Jamila Minnicks Gleason's Moonrise Over New Jessup.

Algonquin Young Readers

Algonquin Young Readers was founded in 2011 by Peter Workman and then Algonquin publisher, Elisabeth Scharlatt, as an imprint of Algonquin Books to publish books of enduring value for young readers, including narrative fiction and non-fiction, picture books, and graphic novels. In 2017, an Algonquin Young Readers novel, The Girl Who Drank the Moon, by Kelly Barnhill, won the John Newbery Medal for the most distinguished contribution to children's literature in the prior year. Furia, by Yamilé Mendez, won the 2021 Pura Belpré Award for the best presentation of the Latin experience in a book for young adults. Algonquin Young Readers titles have also won Edgar Allan Poe awards for best YA and juvenile mystery, and have been nominated for the National Book Award for young people's literature. Algonquin Young Readers authors include Kelly Barnhill, Elizabeth C. Bunce (Myrtle Hardcastle Mysteries), Kelly Jensen (Don’t) Call Me Crazy, Samantha Mabry (All the Wind in the World), Amy Timberlake (Skunk and Badger series), Genzaburō Yoshino (How Do You Live?), and April Genevieve Tucholke (Beatrice Likes the Dark).

Storey Publishing

In 1983 John Storey bought Garden Way Publishing from Garden Way and changed the name to Storey Publishing. The company specializes in highly illustrated do-it-yourself books for adults and children, with a focus on farming, gardening, crafts, cooking, nature appreciation, backyard building, and natural wellness and herbal medicine. Popular titles include Rosemary Gladstar's Medicinal Herbs: A Beginner's Guide, Fermented Vegetables, The Backpack Explorer: On the Nature Trail, Cooking Class, Ocean Anatomy, and The Year-Round Vegetable Gardener. Storey's authors include Julia Rothman, Maia Toll, Catherine Newman, Ty Allan Jackson, and the Xerces Society. Storey is based in North Adams, Massachusetts.

Timber

Timber Press was founded in 1978 and is based in Portland, Oregon. It was acquired by Workman Publishing in 2006. Timber publishes books for gardeners, both amateur and professional, nature enthusiasts, environmentalists, and popular science readers. It also has a robust regional program. Some of their popular titles include Bringing Nature Home and Nature's Best Hope by Douglas Tallamy, Beatrix Potter's Gardening Life by Marta McDowell, Michael Dirr's Encyclopedia of Trees and Shrubs, and Teaming with Microbes by Jeff Lowenfels.
