= Winchuck River =

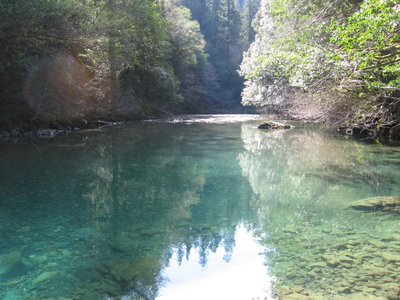
- The Winchuck River

- Location of the mouth of the Winchuck River in Oregon
- Etymology: Uncertain. Possibly the Chinook Jargon term for windy water. Possibly the local native name for woman.

Location
- Country: United States
- State: Oregon
- County: Curry County, Oregon and Del Norte County, California

Physical characteristics
- Source: confluence of Bear and Salmon creeks
  - location: Curry County, Siskiyou National Forest, Oregon
  - coordinates: 42°01′09″N 124°06′20″W
  - elevation: 164 ft (50 m)
- Mouth: Pacific Ocean
  - location: Crissey Field State Recreation Site, Curry County, Oregon
  - coordinates: 42°00′18″N 124°12′55″W
  - elevation: 7 ft (2.1 m)
- Length: 10 mi (16 km)
- Basin size: 71.3 sq mi (185 km^{2})
- Discharge
  - average: 494 cu ft/s (14.0 m^{3}/s)

The Winchuck River (Tolowa: duu-sr-xuu-shi taa-ghin-li~') is a short coastal stream that runs through the Rogue River–Siskiyou National Forest to the Pacific Ocean in the U.S. states of Oregon and California. Flowing generally west from its origin near Elk Mountain, the river enters the sea at Crissey Field State Recreation Site, about 1/2 mile (0.80 km) north of the Oregon–California border and about 5 miles (8 km) south of Brookings.

Formed by the confluence of Fourth of July Creek and Bear Creek in southern Curry County, the river flows generally west. Just below the source, Salmon Creek enters from the left, then Elk Creek and Deer Creek enter from the right. Further downstream, the Winchuck receives Moser Creek and the South Fork Winchuck River, both from the left. The river then leaves Oregon, flowing in Del Norte County, California, for a short distance before re-entering Oregon. The Winchuck passes under U.S. Route 101 in Oregon just before reaching the ocean. Winchuck River Road runs along or near the north side of the river for much of its course.

The main stem and tributaries support chinook and coho salmon, steelhead, and sea-run coastal cutthroat trout. Access for fishing is limited, especially along the lower stretches of the river. Fishing from boats is not allowed, but Winchuck River Road provides public access in places.

Flora in the watershed's forests include Douglas-fir, bigleaf maple, and madrone, typical of the Southern Oregon Coast Range, the coastal Siskiyou Mountains, and the Redwoods Zone. Most of Oregon's remaining coast redwood forest lies within the Winchuck drainage. Sensitive fauna in the watershed include the spotted owl and marbled murrelet.

== Works cited ==
- McArthur, Lewis A.; McArthur, Lewis L. (2003) [1928]. Oregon Geographic Names (7th ed.). Portland, Oregon: Oregon Historical Society Press. ISBN 978-0875952772.
- McGuire, Mike (June 2001). "Winchuck River Watershed Assessment" (PDF). Oregon Department of Fish and Wildlife. Retrieved April 12, 2011.
- Sheehan, Madelynne Diness (2005). Fishing in Oregon: The Complete Oregon Fishing Guide (Tenth ed.). Scappoose, Oregon: Flying Pencil Publications. ISBN 978-0-916473-15-0. OCLC 60631276.
