= Green Valley Lake, California =

Unincorporated community in California, United States

Green Valley Lake
- Unincorporated community
- Location within the state of California Green Valley Lake (the United States)
- Coordinates: 34°14′27″N 117°4′38″W
- Country: United States
- State: California
- County: San Bernardino
- Time zone: UTC-8 (Pacific (PST))
  - Summer (DST): UTC-7 (PDT)
- ZIP codes: 92341
- Area code: 909

Green Valley Lake is an unincorporated community in San Bernardino County, California. It has a population of about 300. The ZIP Code is 92341 and the community is inside area code 909.

== Location ==
Green Valley Lake is located in the San Bernardino Mountains. The two closest neighboring towns are Arrowbear and Running Springs. The community is set at an elevation of 7,200 feet (2,195 m), and is the highest subdivision in the San Bernardino National Forest. There are 1,100 properties in the community and 300 full-time residents (according to post office records). Green Valley Lake has a 9-acre (36,000 m^{2}) lake.

== The Lake ==
The lake was artificially created in 1926 with the construction of the Green Valley Dam and is approximately 9 acres (36,000 m^{2}) in size. The lake is fed by Green Valley Creek, rain, snow, and underground springs. Fish are regularly stocked from May - August; the lake freezes over in the winter.

== Fishing ==
Green Valley Lake is open for fishing from 5:30 AM to 8:00 PM Fishing fees are $25.00 for adults, and $15.00 for children under 16. Parking is free. There is no overnight parking or camping by the lake but there is a tent campground a mile to the east at the end of Green Valley Lake Road. You must have a California state fishing license and all Fish and Game rules apply. Each fisherman must have their own stringer the limit is (5) trout or (25) crappies. All largemouth bass are to be released. Bait fisherman must keep their catch. Catch and release are with artificial lures ONLY. Float tubes are not allowed.

There are also bass and crappie in the lake.

- The lake record rainbow trout is 15 Pounds, 2 ounces and was 30 inches long caught by local angler Chuck Jewell on 7/24/2016. This broke the long time record of 13.3 pounds.
- The lake record brown trout is 6 pounds, 2 ounces caught by local fisherman Greg Stephens.

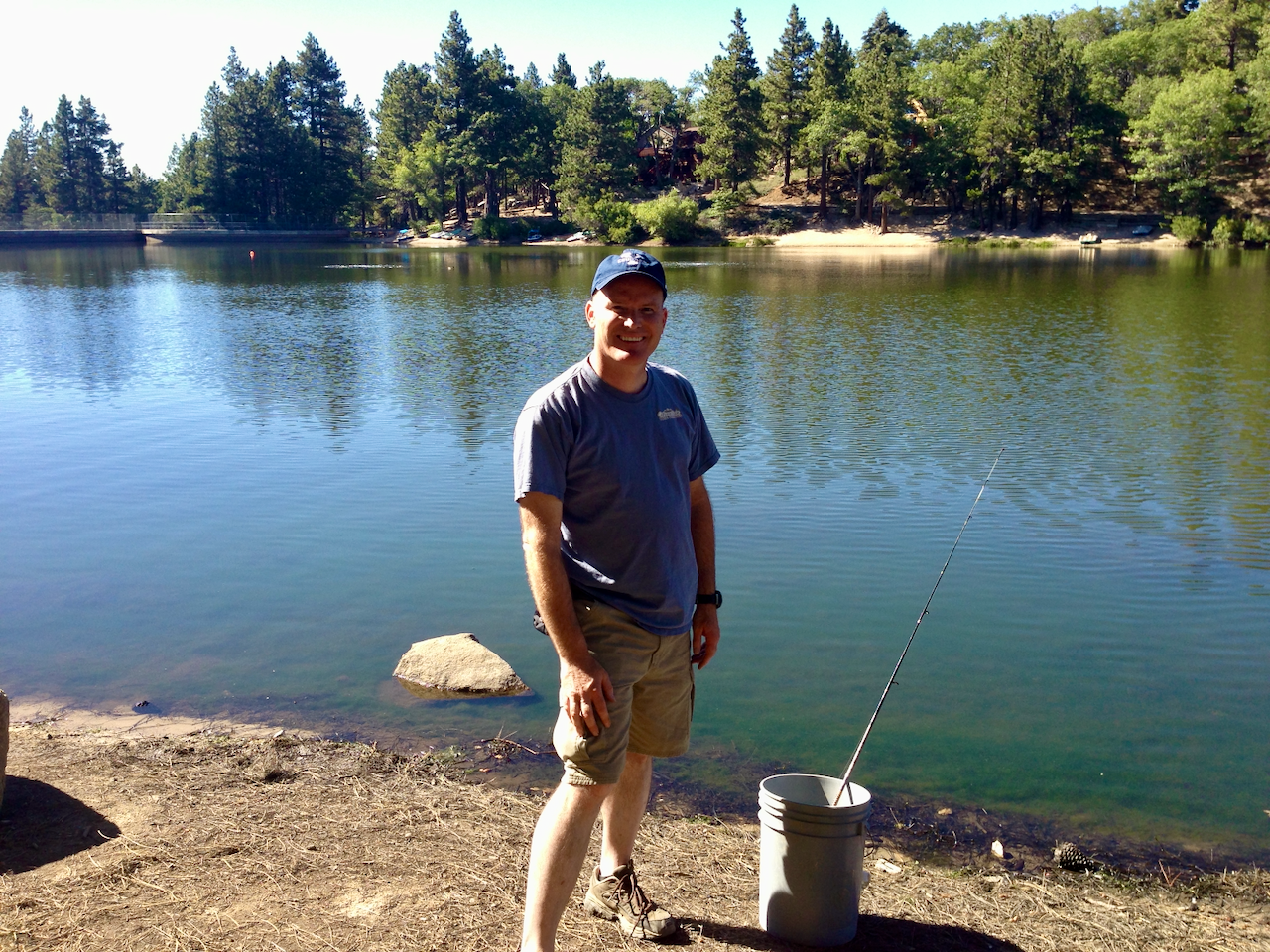
Mountain resident fishing along the shore of Green Valley Lake, CA

== History ==
1880s Timber claims made on Green Valley area by Highland Lumber Co.

1891 Highland Lumber builds City Creek Toll Rd. (Hwy 330) Took lumber from Fredalba to Molina Box Factory to make orange crates.

1892-94 Horse trail from Fredalba lumber camp to Big Bear widened into toll wagon road by Bear Valley Wagon Rd. Co.Eleven-room Toll House was near entrance to campground. They gave the name of Green Valley to the area.

1893 San Bernardino National Forest "Reserve" created.

1894 Ben Pitts operates tollhouse each summer. Grows huge potatoes to serve guests. Leaves in 1902 to open hotel in Redlands.

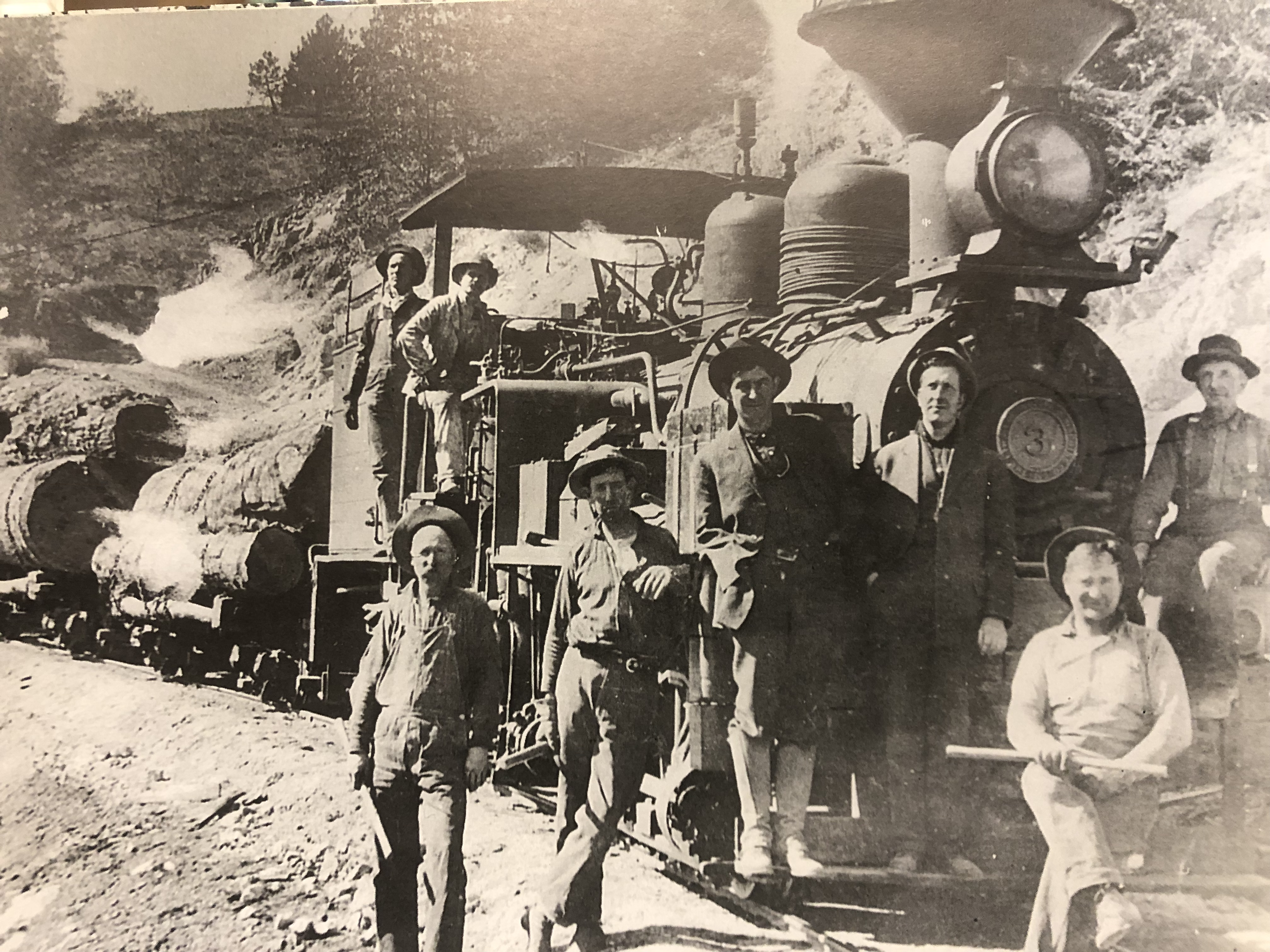
Brookings Lumber & Box Company logging railroad in 1905.

1899 Highland Lumber Co. bought out by Brookings Lumber & Box Company, which built a logging railroad between Heaps Peak and Green Valley Lake, to bring logs to its mill at Fredalba.

1903 Tillitt family settles in Green Valley to run the tollhouse for Bear Valley Wagon Road Co. George and Demaris (May) have three children. For 17 years they run tollhouse, general store, garage, and maintain the road. Send Jefferey Pine seeds to South Africa for British government. They spend winters at house on Del Rosa.

1904 Brookings hauls 27 ton locomotive up mountain by 6 wagons pulled by mules.

1911 County purchases toll road. Brookings rail reaches Green Valley Lake.

1912 Green Valley area clear-cut except for Tillit's homestead area (now campground)

1913 Brookings sells out and moves to Oregon. Most of the land bought by Marion Shay for cattle grazing.

1915 Trading Post and gas station built next to tollhouse. Tillitt improves Fawnskin road for automobiles for the county.

1923 Deep Creek Cutoff completed (Hwy 18) to Big Bear. Nicknamed “Arctic Circle”. Cuts off Green Valley.

1924 Harry McMullen (Green Valley Mac) buys up property with idea of the dam; he sells the idea and the land to DeWitt-Blair Co. who are financed by Union Bank. Contractors Clinton, Code, & Hill design the dam, the subdivision, and a water system. Mac was a fishing guide that led parties on horseback to the Deep Creek area.

1925 San Bernardino National Forest created. “Inholdings” remain private property.

1926 Dam finished. Lake is 8.5 acres (34,000 m^{2}). First lots to sell were the Tillits homestead lots that were saved from the logging in 1912.

2007 Slide fire destroys app. 10% of town, including Fox Lumber and a real estate office.

Information gathered from [Green Valley Lake Homepage]

== Weather ==
The weather is quite variable. In the summer, temperatures regularly attain about 80 degrees Fahrenheit. In the winter, temperatures can drop to nearly 15 °F (−9 °C). The lake is usually frozen from December to February. Green Valley Lake receives considerable snowfall every year.
