= Badfish =

Badfish may refer to:

- Badfish (band), a U.S. tribute band
- "Badfish" (song), a 1993 song by American ska-punk band Sublime

== See also ==
- Bad Fish
