= Running Springs, California =

Running Springs
- Census-designated place
- Location in San Bernardino County and the state of California

- Location in the United States
- Coordinates: 34°12′28″N 117°6′30″W
- Country: United States
- State: California
- County: San Bernardino

Area
  - Total: 4.213 sq mi (10.912 km^{2})
  - Land: 4.204 sq mi (10.889 km^{2})
  - Water: 0.0089 sq mi (0.023 km^{2}) 0.21%
- Elevation: 6,109 ft (1,862 m)

Population (2020)
  - Total: 5,268
  - Density: 1,253/sq mi (483.8/km^{2})
- Demonym: Running Springser
- Time zone: UTC-8 (PST)
  - Summer (DST): UTC-7 (PDT)
- ZIP code: 92382
- Area code: 909
- FIPS code: 06-63316
- GNIS feature ID: 1661346

Running Springs is a census-designated place (CDP) in San Bernardino County, California, United States. The population was 5,268 at the 2020 census, up from 4,862 at the 2010 census. Running Springs is situated 17 miles (27 km) west of the city of Big Bear Lake.

Running Springs is home to the 3,400-acre (1,400 ha) National Children's Forest, which offers interpretive programs, educational tours and more. Snow Valley Mountain Resort was established here in the 1920s and was the first ski resort in the San Bernardino Mountains.

== History ==
The first people to settle here were the Serrano people ("mountain people"). They got their name from Spanish priest Father Garces in 1776, but called themselves Yuhaviatam ("people of the pines"). Numerous mortar holes can be seen throughout the area, made by the Serranos grinding acorns into meal. Native Americans settled here due to the rich natural resources. They gathered acorns and herbs, also hunting deer, rabbits and other wildlife.

Running Springs was originally known as Hunsaker Flats, named for Abraham Hunsaker, an early member of the Mormon Battalion. The area was developed after improvements to the state highways in the 1920s.

== Geography ==
Running Springs is located at 34°12′28″N 117°6′30″W (34.207739, -117.108285).

According to the United States Census Bureau, the CDP has a total area of 4.2 square miles (10.9 km^{2}), 99.79% of it is land and 0.21% is water.

== Demographics ==
Historical population
Census	Pop.	Note	%±
1990	4,195		—
2000	5,125		22.2%
2010	4,862		−5.1%
2020	5,268		8.4%
U.S. Decennial Census; 1850–1870 1880-1890; 1900 1910 1920; 1930 1940 1950; 1960 1970 1980; 1990 2000 2010

Running Springs first appeared as a census designated place in the 1990 U.S. census.

=== 2020 census ===
As of the 2020 census, Running Springs had a population of 5,268 and a population density of 1,253.1 inhabitants per square mile (483.8/km^{2}). The median age was 43.9 years. 20.5% of residents were under the age of 18, 5.6% were aged 18 to 24, 24.9% were aged 25 to 44, 29.7% were aged 45 to 64, and 19.3% were 65 years of age or older. For every 100 females, there were 105.1 males, and for every 100 females age 18 and over there were 103.4 males age 18 and over.

98.4% of residents lived in urban areas, while 1.6% lived in rural areas.

The whole population lived in households. There were 2,242 households in Running Springs, of which 24.7% had children under the age of 18 living in them. Of all households, 48.3% were married-couple households, 7.0% were cohabiting couple households, 23.7% were households with a male householder and no spouse or partner present, and 21.1% were households with a female householder and no spouse or partner present. About 28.9% of all households were made up of individuals and 10.8% had someone living alone who was 65 years of age or older. The average household size was 2.35. There were 1,438 families (64.1% of all households).

There were 3,693 housing units, of which 2,242 (60.7%) were occupied and 1,451 (39.3%) were vacant. Of the occupied units, 77.0% were owner-occupied and 23.0% were occupied by renters. The homeowner vacancy rate was 3.8% and the rental vacancy rate was 9.1%.

Racial composition as of the 2020 census
Race	Number	Percent
White	4,042	76.7%
Black or African American	51	1.0%
American Indian and Alaska Native	60	1.1%
Asian	78	1.5%
Native Hawaiian and Other Pacific Islander	14	0.3%
Some other race	318	6.0%
Two or more races	705	13.4%
Hispanic or Latino (of any race)	1,062	20.2%

=== Demographic estimates ===
In 2023, the US Census Bureau estimated that 4.9% of the population were foreign-born. Of all people aged 5 or older, 89.1% spoke only English at home, 6.2% spoke Spanish, 0.9% spoke other Indo-European languages, 3.8% spoke Asian or Pacific Islander languages, and 0.0% spoke other languages. Of those aged 25 or older, 94.4% were high school graduates and 35.6% had a bachelor's degree.

=== Income and poverty ===
The median household income in 2023 was $85,681, and the per capita income was $39,966. About 10.8% of families and 14.1% of the population were below the poverty line.

=== 2010 census ===
At the 2010 census Running Springs had a population of 4,862. The population density was 1,154.0 inhabitants per square mile (445.6/km^{2}). The racial makeup of Running Springs was 4,325 (89.0%) White (79.8% Non-Hispanic White), 23 (0.5%) African American, 47 (1.0%) Native American, 50 (1.0%) Asian, 6 (0.1%) Pacific Islander, 146 (3.0%) from other races, and 265 (5.5%) from two or more races. Hispanic or Latino of any race were 695 people (14.3%).

The whole population lived in households, no one lived in non-institutionalized group quarters and no one was institutionalized.

There were 1,944 households, 611 (31.4%) had children under the age of 18 living in them, 1,026 (52.8%) were opposite-sex married couples living together, 171 (8.8%) had a female householder with no husband present, 106 (5.5%) had a male householder with no wife present. There were 114 (5.9%) unmarried opposite-sex partnerships, and 38 (2.0%) same-sex married couples or partnerships. 477 households (24.5%) were one person and 140 (7.2%) had someone living alone who was 65 or older. The average household size was 2.50. There were 1,303 families (67.0% of households); the average family size was 2.99.

The age distribution was 1,119 people (23.0%) under the age of 18, 375 people (7.7%) aged 18 to 24, 1,157 people (23.8%) aged 25 to 44, 1,672 people (34.4%) aged 45 to 64, and 539 people (11.1%) who were 65 or older. The median age was 41.7 years. For every 100 females, there were 105.5 males. For every 100 females age 18 and over, there were 103.4 males.

There were 3,729 housing units at an average density of 885.1 per square mile, of the occupied units 1,419 (73.0%) were owner-occupied and 525 (27.0%) were rented. The homeowner vacancy rate was 5.3%; the rental vacancy rate was 12.6%. 3,450 people (71.0% of the population) lived in owner-occupied housing units and 1,412 people (29.0%) lived in rental housing units.

According to the 2010 United States Census, Running Springs had a median household income of $59,111, with 9.3% of the population living below the federal poverty line.

== Government ==
In the California State Legislature, Running Springs is in the 19th senatorial district, represented by Republican Rosilicie Ochoa Bogh, and in the 34th Assembly district, represented by Republican Tom Lackey.

In the United States House of Representatives, Running Springs is in California's 23rd congressional district, represented by Republican Jay Obernolte.

== Surroundings and economy ==
Running Springs is a mountain community in the San Bernardino Mountains. It is an inholding in the San Bernardino National Forest. Situated at the junction of State Route 18 and State Route 330, it is a major gateway to the mountain communities of Lake Arrowhead, Arrowbear, Green Valley Lake, and Big Bear and is the closest community to Snow Valley Mountain Resort. It lies some 16 miles (26 km) northeast of the city of Highland, California, up State Route 330, at an elevation of 6,080 feet (1,850 m). While there is no primary industry in Running Springs, there are service industries geared to the tourism market, as the San Bernardino National Forest is a year-round tourist destination.

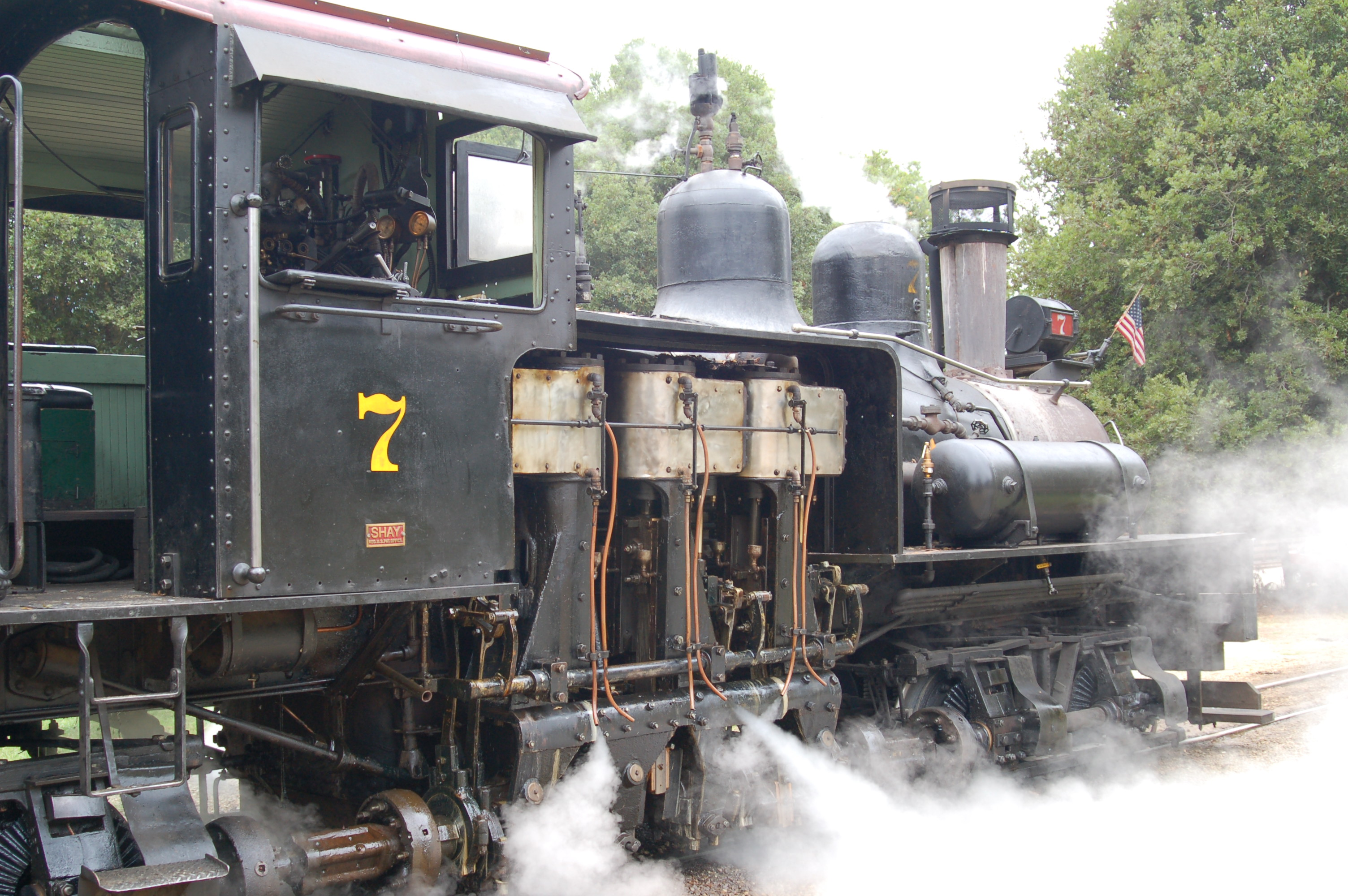
An example of a Shay logging locomotive. The gearing arrangement gives it greater pulling capacity (but slower speed), which is advantageous with heavy loads on steep grades typical of western logging railroads. This one is still in use on the Roaring Camp and Big Trees Narrow Gauge Railroad in Felton, California.

Additionally, Running Springs, together with surrounding communities, form a bedroom community for commuters who are employed in San Bernardino.

Running Springs is a member community of the Rim of the World, an inhabited stretch of the San Bernardino Mountains and wholly contained in the San Bernardino National Forest. The Rim (as it is locally known) extends from Crestline to Big Bear, a distance of some 30 miles (48 km). Running Springs is served by Rim of the World High School and Mary Putnam Henck Intermediate School situated in Lake Arrowhead.

Logging in the San Bernardino Mountains was once done on a large scale, with the Brookings Lumber & Box Company operation the largest. It operated on 8,000 acres (32 km^{2}) between Fredalba and Hunsaker Flats (present-day Running Springs), and extending northward to Heap's Ranch and Lightningdale (near Green Valley Lake) between 1899 and 1912. It built a logging railroad to bring logs to the mill at Fredalba. The Shay locomotives had to be disassembled and hauled by wagon up the mountain, since the railroad operated in the high country but did not connect to other railroads in the lowlands. About 60% of the finished lumber was hauled by wagon down the steep grades to the Molino box factory in Highland, which made packing crates for the citrus grown in the area. The remaining 40% went to the company's retail lumber yard in San Bernardino. In 1912, the company dismantled the Fredalba sawmill and moved much of the machinery to Brookings, Oregon.

== Education ==
It is in the Rim of the World Unified School District.

== In popular culture ==
Film producer David O. Selznick lived in Running Springs and decided to use neighboring Big Bear Lake for scenes in his 1939 film Gone With the Wind. Movies filmed in Running Springs include Next (2007), When a Stranger Calls (2006), Communion (1989), Small Town Saturday Night (2010), I'm Reed Fish (2006), Messenger of Death (1988), Demon Legacy (2014), The Bigfoot Project (2017) and Cold Cabin (2010).

The film Running Springs was set and filmed in the Running Springs area.

== Sister cities ==
- Sehmatal, Germany

== See also ==
- Arrowbear Lake, California
- Big Bear Discovery Center
- CEDU
- Running Springs Chamber of Commerce
