= Anderson Peak (San Bernardino Mountains) =

Mountain in California, United States

- Location within California

Highest point
- Elevation: 10,844+ ft (3305+ m) NAVD 88
- Prominence: 840 ft (256 m)
- Listing: Hundred Peaks Section
- Coordinates: 34°07′28″N 116°53′40″W

Geography
- Location: San Bernardino County, California, U.S.
- Parent range: San Bernardino Mountains
- Topo map: USGS Forest Falls

Climbing
- Easiest route: Strenuous Hike, class 1

Anderson Peak is a mountain on the Mount San Gorgonio crestline in Southern California's San Gorgonio Wilderness, which is part of the San Bernardino National Forest. It is 3.2 miles (5.1 km) from Jepson Peak. Although not above the tree line, snow tends to cover the crest from early winter until late spring.
