= Arrowbear Lake, California =

Unincorporated community in California, United States

- Unincorporated community

- Location within the state of California
- Coordinates: 34°12′39″N 117°05′00″W
- Country: United States
- State: California
- County: San Bernardino

Population (2000)
  - Total: 736
- Time zone: UTC-8 (Pacific (PST))
  - Summer (DST): UTC-7 (PDT)
- ZIP codes: 92382
- GNIS feature ID: 269578

Arrowbear Lake is an unincorporated community in San Bernardino County, California, United States.

== Description ==
Its altitude is 6,086 feet (1,855 m) in the San Bernardino Mountains. It is located east of Running Springs along Highway 18 in the San Bernardino National Forest, a mountain community with a population of 736 in 2000.

The town is so-called because it is halfway between Lake Arrowhead and Big Bear.
