= Harris Beach State Park =

State park in Oregon, United States

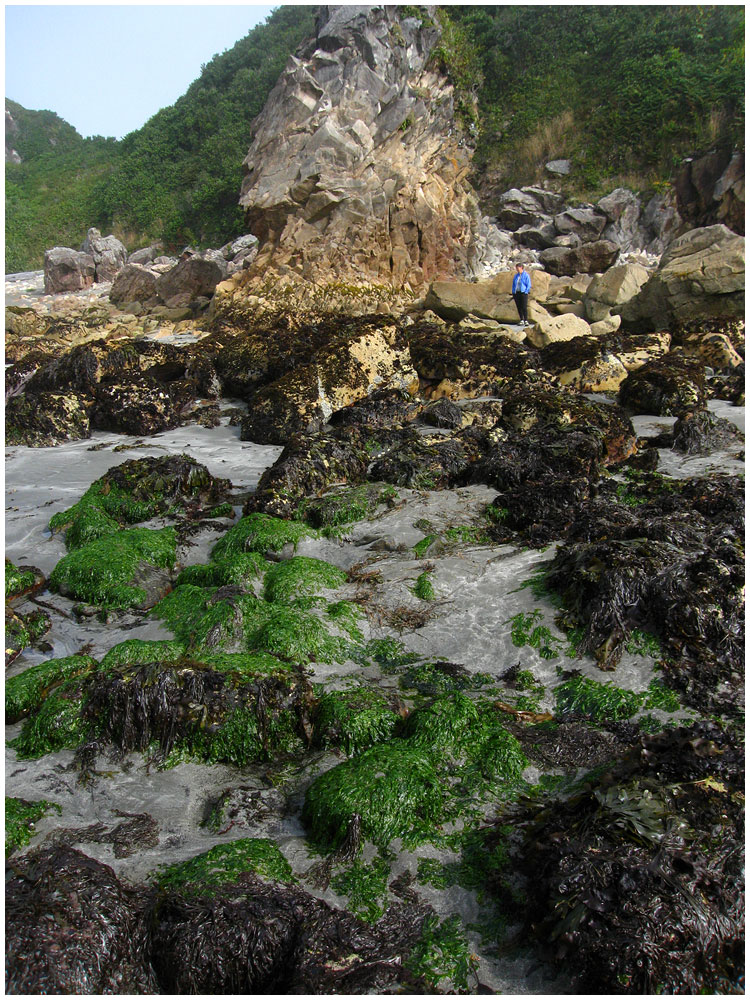
- Harris Beach tidelands
- Interactive map of Harris Beach State Park
- Type: Public, state
- Location: Curry County, Oregon
- Nearest city: Brookings
- Coordinates: 42°04′01″N 124°18′25″W
- Operator: Oregon Parks and Recreation Department

Harris Beach State Park is an Oregon State Park located on US Highway 101, north of Brookings. The day-use area offers a restroom and picnic area with tables, and the campground has RV sites, yurts and tent sites available year-round.

Harris Beach State Park is home to Bird Island (also known as Goat Island), which is reported to be the largest island off the Oregon Coast and is a National Wildlife Refuge. The island is also a breeding site for rare birds such as the tufted puffin.

Lichen-forming fungi Helocarpon lesdainii can be found on Picea sitchensis (Sitka spruce) trees in the Park.

== See also ==
- List of Oregon State Parks
