= Brookings, Oregon =

- City
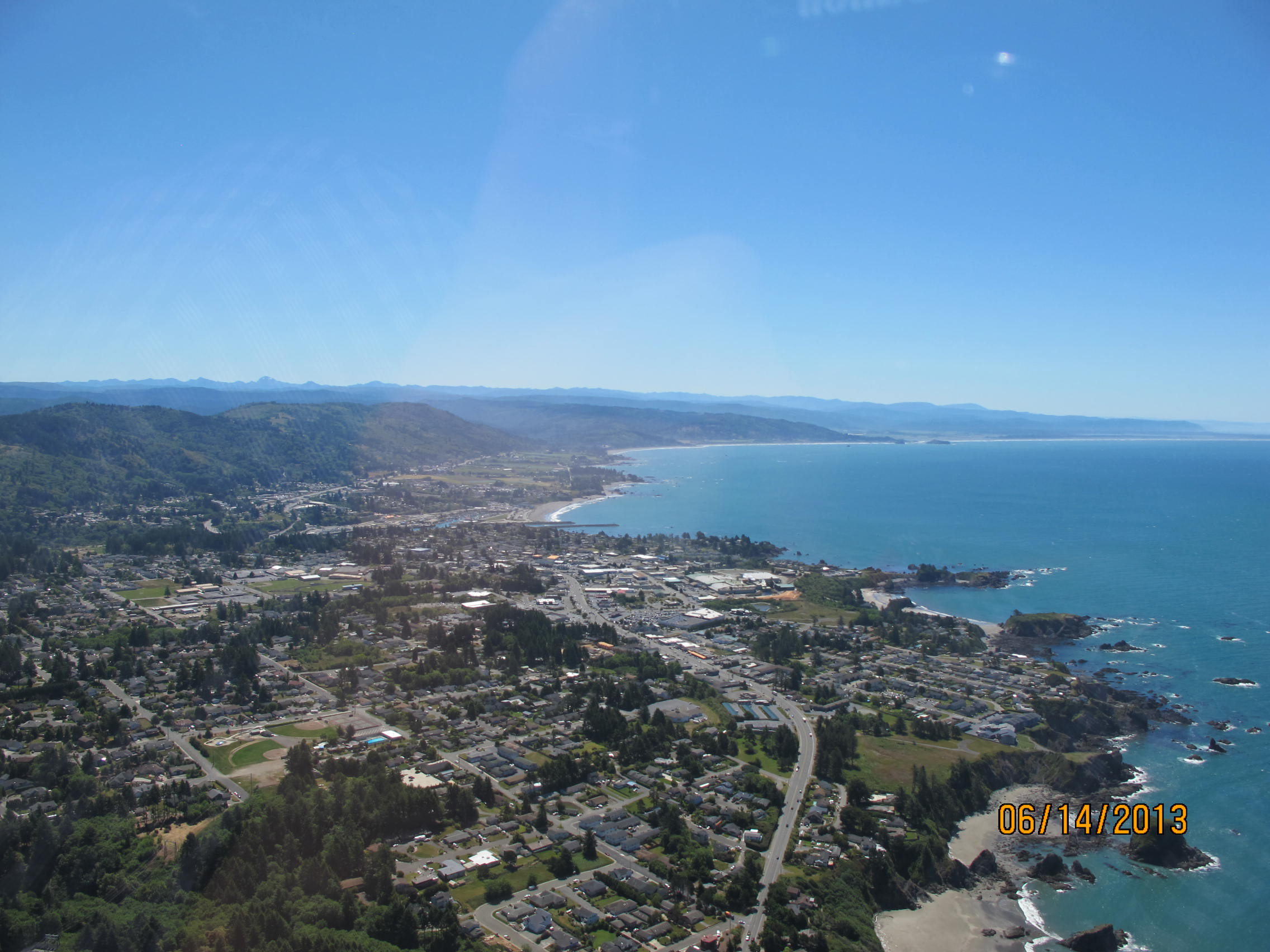
- An aerial view of Brookings, Oregon, and its coastline

- Flag
- Interactive map of Brookings, Oregon
- Location within Oregon
- Coordinates: 42.0724°N 124.3048°W
- Country: United States
- State: Oregon
- County: Curry
- Founded: 1908
- Incorporated: October 15, 1951
- Named for: John E. Brookings

Government
  - Type: Mayor–Council
  - Mayor: Phoebe Pereda
  - Councilmembers: Clayton Malmberg; Jim Jollota; Andy Martin; Tony Bond

Area
  - City: 4.155 sq mi (10.761 km^{2})
  - Land: 4.148 sq mi (10.742 km^{2})
  - Water: 0.0081 sq mi (0.021 km^{2}) 0.19%
- Elevation: 220 ft (67 m)

Population (2020)
  - City: 6,744
  - Estimate (2025): 6,431
  - Density: 1,626/sq mi (627.8/km^{2})
  - Urban: 11,294
  - Metro: 22,621 (US: 490th)
- Time zone: UTC–8 (Pacific (PST))
  - Summer (DST): UTC–7 (PDT)
- ZIP Code: 97415
- Area codes: 458 and 541
- FIPS code: 41-08650
- GNIS feature ID: 2409916
- Highways: US 101, OR 255
- Website: brookings.or.us

Brookings is a coastal city in Curry County, Oregon, United States, located on the southern Oregon coast near the California state border. Situated at the mouth of the Chetco River along U.S. Route 101, it is the southernmost coastal city in Oregon. The city lies within the region known as the Wild Rivers Coast and is adjacent to the unincorporated community of Harbor, Oregon, which lies across the Chetco River.

Brookings originated as a company town established by the Brookings Timber and Lumber Company in 1908, and was named after timber businessman John E. Brookings. The development of U.S. Route 101 helped connect the previously isolated community to the wider region and contributed to its growth.

The surrounding area is known for its rugged Pacific coastline, temperate coastal climate, called the Banana Belt, and proximity to the Redwood National and State Parks in northern California.

The area was largely populated by the Chetco people, an indigenous ethnic group whose villages were located along the Chetco River and the surrounding coastline for thousands of years. Following conflicts with Euro-American settlers during the 1850s, the Chetco people were forcibly removed and relocated to the Siletz Reservation in 1856.

The population was 6,744 as of the 2020 census, and was estimated at 6,431 in 2025.

== History ==
It was named after John E. Brookings, president of the Brookings Lumber & Box Company, who founded the city in 1908. The City of Brookings was incorporated on October 15, 1951.

=== Founding ===
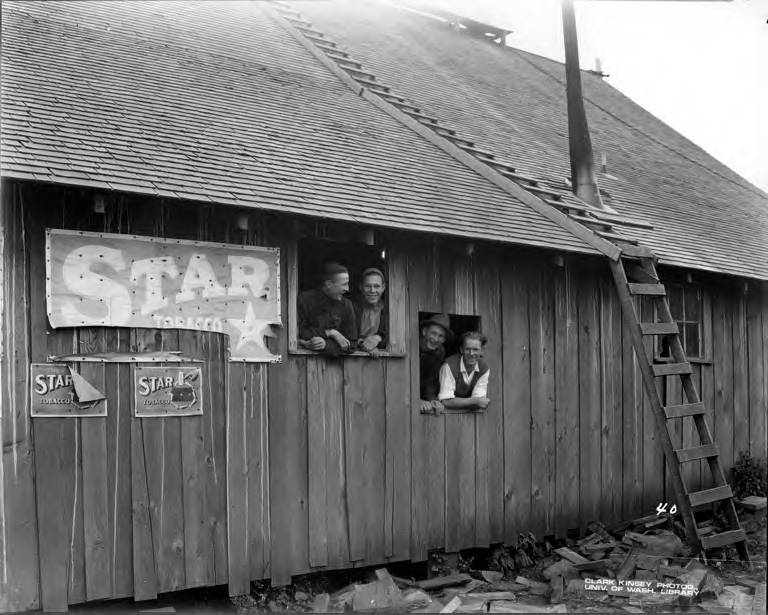
Crew looking out of camp building windows, Brookings Timber and Lumber Company, Brookings, c. 1919

In 1906, the Brookings Timber Company hired William James Ward, a graduate in civil engineering and forestry, to come to the southern Oregon Coast and survey its lumbering potential. After timber cruising the Chetco and Pistol River areas for several years, he concluded that conditions were favorable for extensive lumbering operations and advised the Brookings Timber Company accordingly to acquire a suitable townsite to accommodate both a mill and a shipping center.

While John E. Brookings was responsible for the founding of Brookings as a company town, it was his cousin, Robert S. Brookings, who was responsible for its actual design. The latter Brookings hired Bernard Maybeck, an architect based in San Francisco who was later involved in the Panama–Pacific International Exposition, to lay out the plat of the townsite.

=== World War II ===
On September 9, 1942, Mount Emily near Brookings became the only site in the mainland United States and the second in the continental territory after the bombing of Dutch Harbor to suffer aerial bombardment during World War II. A Japanese floatplane piloted by Nobuo Fujita was launched from submarine I-25. The plane was armed with two incendiary bombs on a mission intended to start massive fires in the dense forests of the Pacific Northwest.

Fujita was invited to Brookings in 1962 and, as a token of friendship, gifted the city his 400-year-old family katana. Fujita later sponsored a trip to Japan for Brookings high school students and returned to the city three more times in the early 1990s. In 1997, Fujita was made an honorary citizen of Brookings by the city council.

=== 2011 tsunami ===
The Port of Brookings Harbor was damaged by tidal surges from a tsunami on March 11, 2011. The largest surge was estimated to be nearly 8 feet (2.4 m). Many boats were damaged and some were even swept out to sea after many docks were damaged. The tsunami was caused by the 9.0 M_{W} Tōhoku earthquake offshore of the east coast of Honshu Island, Japan. The damage was estimated at $25 million to $30 million.

== Geography ==
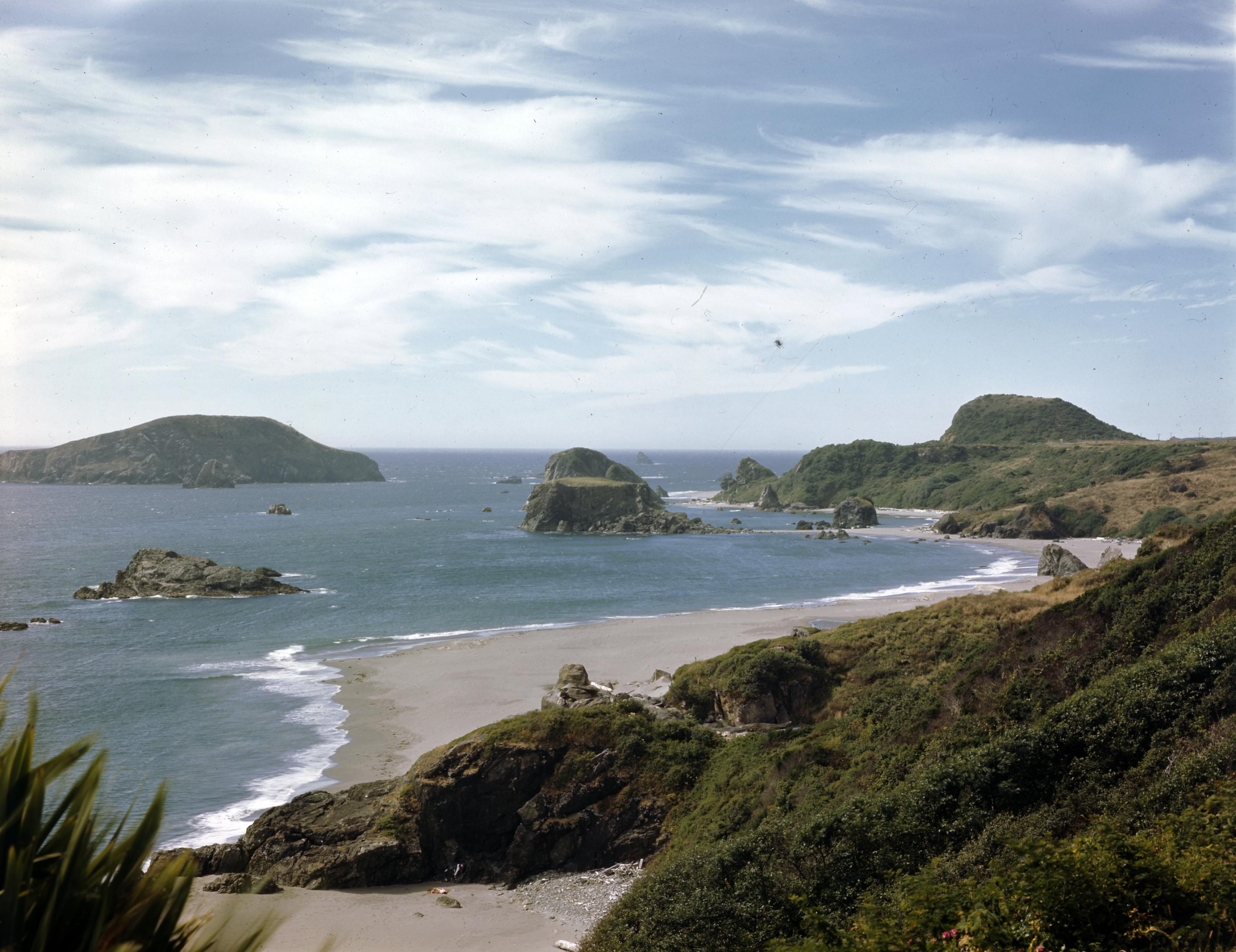
Coastline of Brookings as seen from U.S. Highway 101

Brookings is located along the southern Oregon coast at the mouth of the Chetco River.

According to the United States Census Bureau, the city has an area of 4.155 square miles (10.76 km^{2}), of which 4.147 square miles (10.74 km^{2}) is land and 0.008 square miles (0.02 km^{2}) (0.19%) is water.

=== Climate ===
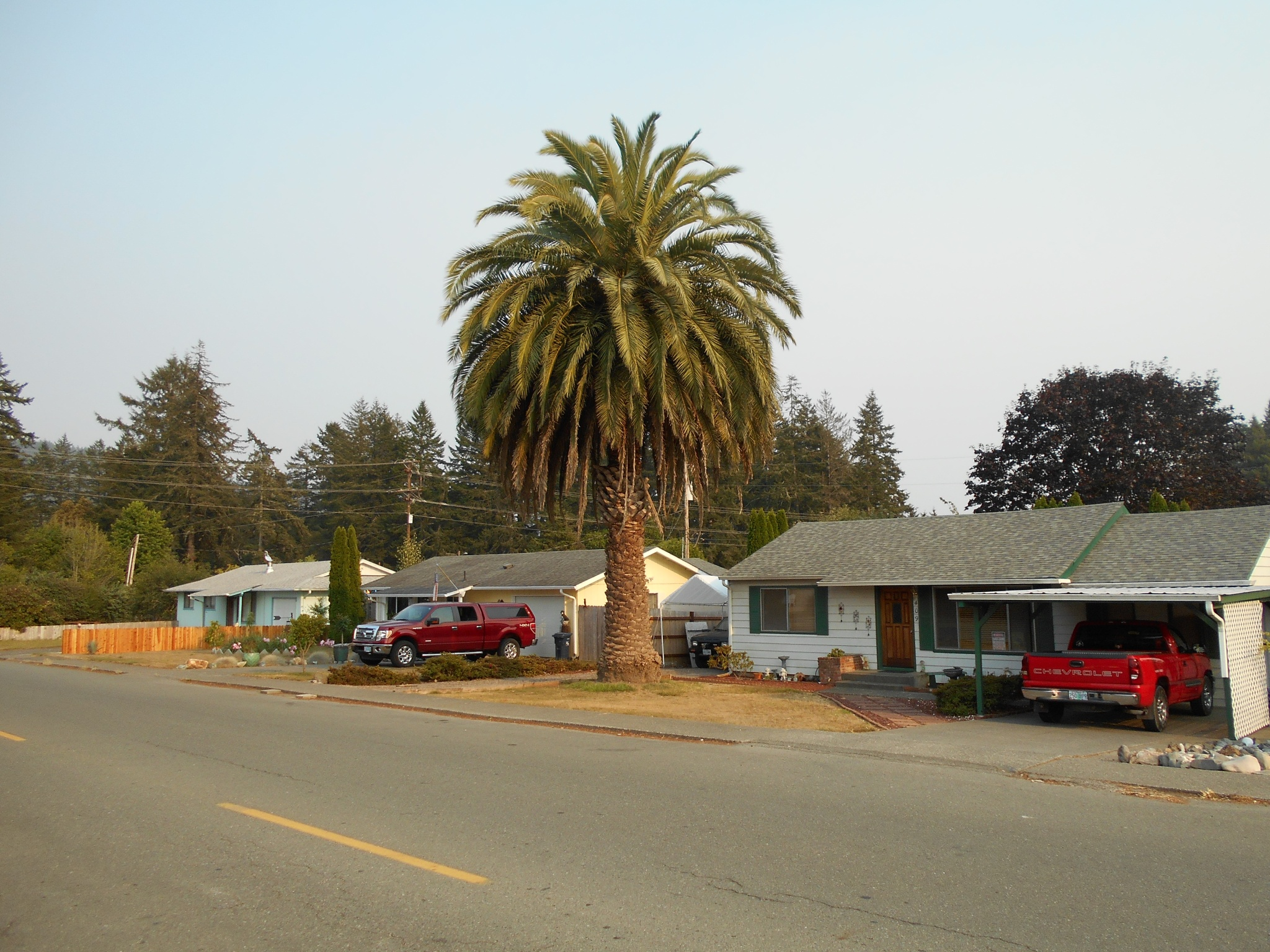
The climate of Brookings is so mild that palm trees can grow there.

Brookings has a mild Mediterranean climate (Köppen climate classification: Csb). According to the Trewartha climate classification, Brookings has a subtropical climate (Cf) since eight months are above 50 °F (10 °C).

A weather phenomenon known as the "Chetco Effect" or the "Brookings Effect" can cause the temperature in Brookings near the Chetco River mouth to be much higher than that of the surrounding area. Adiabatic heating increases the temperature and reduces relative humidity as katabatic winds, driven by high pressure on the Great Basin, descend across the west slopes of the Cascade Range and Oregon Coast Range. The heart of Brookings, with its orientation, is protected from sea breezes coming from the northwest and the warm, dry, down-sloping winds that are funneled down the Coastal Range into the deep Chetco River gorge can reach the coast uninfluenced by the effects of the Pacific. This can result in large temperature gradients; when Brookings recorded its all-time record high on July 8, 2008 of 108 °F (42 °C), Crescent City, around 30 miles (48 km) south of Brookings, recorded a high temperature of just 68 °F (20 °C).

Climate data for Brookings, Oregon, 1991−2020 normals, extremes 1913−present (Note: Records maintained at the Brookings COOP (42°02′47″N 124°17′16″W) since May 2002, and at the Brookings 2 SE COOP before then.)
Month	Jan	Feb	Mar	Apr	May	Jun	Jul	Aug	Sep	Oct	Nov	Dec	Year
Record high °F (°C)	80 (27)	85 (29)	88 (31)	92 (33)	99 (37)	100 (38)	108 (42)	101 (38)	103 (39)	100 (38)	88 (31)	79 (26)	108 (42)
Mean daily maximum °F (°C)	53.7 (12.1)	54.7 (12.6)	55.4 (13.0)	57.9 (14.4)	61.7 (16.5)	64.6 (18.1)	66.6 (19.2)	66.4 (19.1)	66.9 (19.4)	62.7 (17.1)	57.3 (14.1)	53.0 (11.7)	60.1 (15.6)
Daily mean °F (°C)	48.6 (9.2)	48.9 (9.4)	49.4 (9.7)	51.4 (10.8)	54.9 (12.7)	58.1 (14.5)	60.0 (15.6)	60.1 (15.6)	59.6 (15.3)	56.0 (13.3)	51.6 (10.9)	47.9 (8.8)	53.9 (12.1)
Mean daily minimum °F (°C)	43.6 (6.4)	43.2 (6.2)	43.4 (6.3)	45.0 (7.2)	48.0 (8.9)	51.4 (10.8)	53.4 (11.9)	53.8 (12.1)	52.3 (11.3)	49.2 (9.6)	45.8 (7.7)	42.7 (5.9)	47.7 (8.7)
Record low °F (°C)	21 (−6)	24 (−4)	29 (−2)	28 (−2)	32 (0)	34 (1)	39 (4)	37 (3)	34 (1)	30 (−1)	28 (−2)	17 (−8)	17 (−8)
Average precipitation inches (mm)	12.57 (319)	9.91 (252)	9.89 (251)	7.09 (180)	3.37 (86)	2.06 (52)	0.39 (9.9)	0.67 (17)	1.46 (37)	4.98 (126)	11.12 (282)	14.10 (358)	77.61 (1,971)
Average snowfall inches (cm)	0.2 (0.51)	0.3 (0.76)	0.1 (0.25)	0 (0)	0 (0)	0 (0)	0 (0)	0 (0)	0 (0)	0 (0)	0 (0)	0.1 (0.25)	0.7 (1.8)
Average precipitation days (≥ 0.05 in)	17.7	16.1	17.9	14.4	9.8	6.0	3.4	3.9	4.9	10.3	17.9	18.5	140.8
Average snowy days (≥ 0.1 in)	0	0.1	0	0	0	0	0	0	0	0	0	0.1	0.2
Source: National Oceanic and Atmospheric Administration

== Demographics ==
Historical population
Census	Pop.	Note	%±
1920	515		—
1930	250		−51.5%
1940	500		100.0%
1950	1,000		100.0%
1960	2,637		163.7%
1970	2,720		3.1%
1980	3,384		24.4%
1990	4,400		30.0%
2000	5,447		23.8%
2010	6,336		16.3%
2020	6,744		6.4%
2025 (est.)	6,431		−4.6%
source: U.S. Decennial Census; 2020 Census

According to realtor website Zillow, the average price of a home as of September 30, 2026, in Brookings was $477,655.

As of the 2024 American Community Survey, there were 2,987 estimated households in Brookings with an average of 2.19 persons per household. The city has a median household income of $74,933. Approximately 16.9% of the city's population lives at or below the poverty line. Brookings has an estimated 55.5% employment rate, with 19.4% of the population holding a bachelor's degree or higher and 90.8% holding a high school diploma. There were 3,296 housing units at an average density of 794.79 per square mile (306.87/km^{2}).

The top five reported languages (people were allowed to report up to two languages, thus the figures will generally add to more than 100%) were English (93.5%), Spanish (4.2%), Indo-European (1.2%), Asian and Pacific Islander (0.6%), and Other (0.5%).

The median age in the city was 50.6 years.

Brookings, Oregon – racial and ethnic composition Note: the US Census treats Hispanic/Latino as an ethnic category. This table excludes Latinos from the racial categories and assigns them to a separate category. Hispanics/Latinos may be of any race.
Race / ethnicity (NH = non-Hispanic)	Pop. 1980	Pop. 1990	Pop. 2000	Pop. 2010	Pop. 2020
White alone (NH)	3,225 (95.30%)	4,163 (94.61%)	4,807 (88.25%)	5,549 (87.58%)	5,291 (78.45%)
Black or African American alone (NH)	0 (0.00%)	16 (0.36%)	11 (0.20%)	19 (0.30%)	27 (0.40%)
Native American or Alaska Native alone (NH)	45 (1.33%)	79 (1.80%)	110 (2.02%)	99 (1.56%)	151 (2.24%)
Asian alone (NH)	12 (0.35%)	51 (1.16%)	69 (1.27%)	60 (0.95%)	90 (1.33%)
Pacific Islander alone (NH)	—	—	7 (0.13%)	7 (0.11%)	9 (0.13%)
Other race alone (NH)	0 (0.00%)	3 (0.07%)	3 (0.06%)	0 (0.00%)	50 (0.74%)
Mixed race or multiracial (NH)	—	—	182 (3.34%)	183 (2.89%)	471 (6.98%)
Hispanic or Latino (any race)	102 (3.01%)	88 (2.00%)	258 (4.74%)	419 (6.61%)	655 (9.71%)
Total	3,384 (100.00%)	4,400 (100.00%)	5,447 (100.00%)	6,336 (100.00%)	6,744 (100.00%)

=== 2020 census ===
As of the 2020 census, there were 6,744 people, 2,968 households, and 1,822 families residing in the city. The population density was 1,626.63 inhabitants per square mile (628.05/km^{2}). There were 3,340 housing units at an average density of 805.60 per square mile (311.04/km^{2}). The racial makeup of the city was 81.49% White, 0.43% African American, 2.54% Native American, 1.33% Asian, 0.13% Pacific Islander, 3.14% from some other races and 10.93% from two or more races. Hispanic or Latino people of any race were 9.71% of the population.

=== 2010 census ===
As of the 2010 census, there were 6,336 people, 2,717 households, and 1,689 families residing in the city. The population density was 1,638.06 inhabitants per square mile (632.46/km^{2}). There were 3,183 housing units at an average density of 822.91 per square mile (317.73/km^{2}). The racial makeup of the city was 92.22% White, 0.35% African American, 1.82% Native American, 0.95% Asian, 0.11% Pacific Islander, 0.95% from some other races and 3.61% from two or more races. Hispanic or Latino people of any race were 6.61% of the population.

There were 2,717 households, of which 26.7% had children under the age of 18 living with them, 46.7% were married couples living together, 11.0% had a female householder with no husband present, 4.5% had a male householder with no wife present, and 37.8% were non-families. 31.3% of all households were made up of individuals, and 15.4% had someone living alone who was 65 years of age or older. The average household size was 2.26 and the average family size was 2.81.

The median age in the city was 46.9 years. 21.1% of residents were under the age of 18; 7% were between the ages of 18 and 24; 19.8% were from 25 to 44; 28% were from 45 to 64; and 24.2% were 65 years of age or older. The gender makeup of the city was 47.7% male and 52.3% female.

=== 2000 census ===
As of the 2000 census, there were 5,447 people, 2,309 households, and 1,484 families residing in the city. The population density was 1,951.57 inhabitants per square mile (753.51/km^{2}). There were 2,614 housing units at an average density of 936.55 per square mile (361.60/km^{2}). The racial makeup of the city was 90.55% White, 0.20% African American, 2.40% Native American, 1.29% Asian, 0.13% Pacific Islander, 1.43% from some other races and 4.00% from two or more races. Hispanic or Latino people of any race were 4.74% of the population.

There were 2,309 households, of which 27.6% had children under the age of 18 living with them, 51.3% were married couples living together, 9.4% had a female householder with no husband present, and 35.7% were non-families. 30.0% of all households were made up of individuals and 16.1% had someone living alone who was 65 years of age or older. The average household size was 2.30 and the average family size was 2.83.

In the city the population was spread out, with 23.8% under the age of 18, 5.7% from 18 to 24, 23.1% from 25 to 44, 23.5% from 45 to 64, and 23.9% who were 65 years of age or older. The median age was 43 years. For every 100 females, there were 90.3 males. For every 100 females age 18 and over, there were 86.3 males.

The median income for a household in the city was $31,656, and the median income for a family was $36,846. Males had a median income of $33,073 versus $22,591 for females. The per capita income for the city was $17,010. About 9.1% of families and 11.5% of the population were below the poverty line, including 14.1% of those under age 18 and 9.5% of those age 65 or over.

== Parks and recreation ==
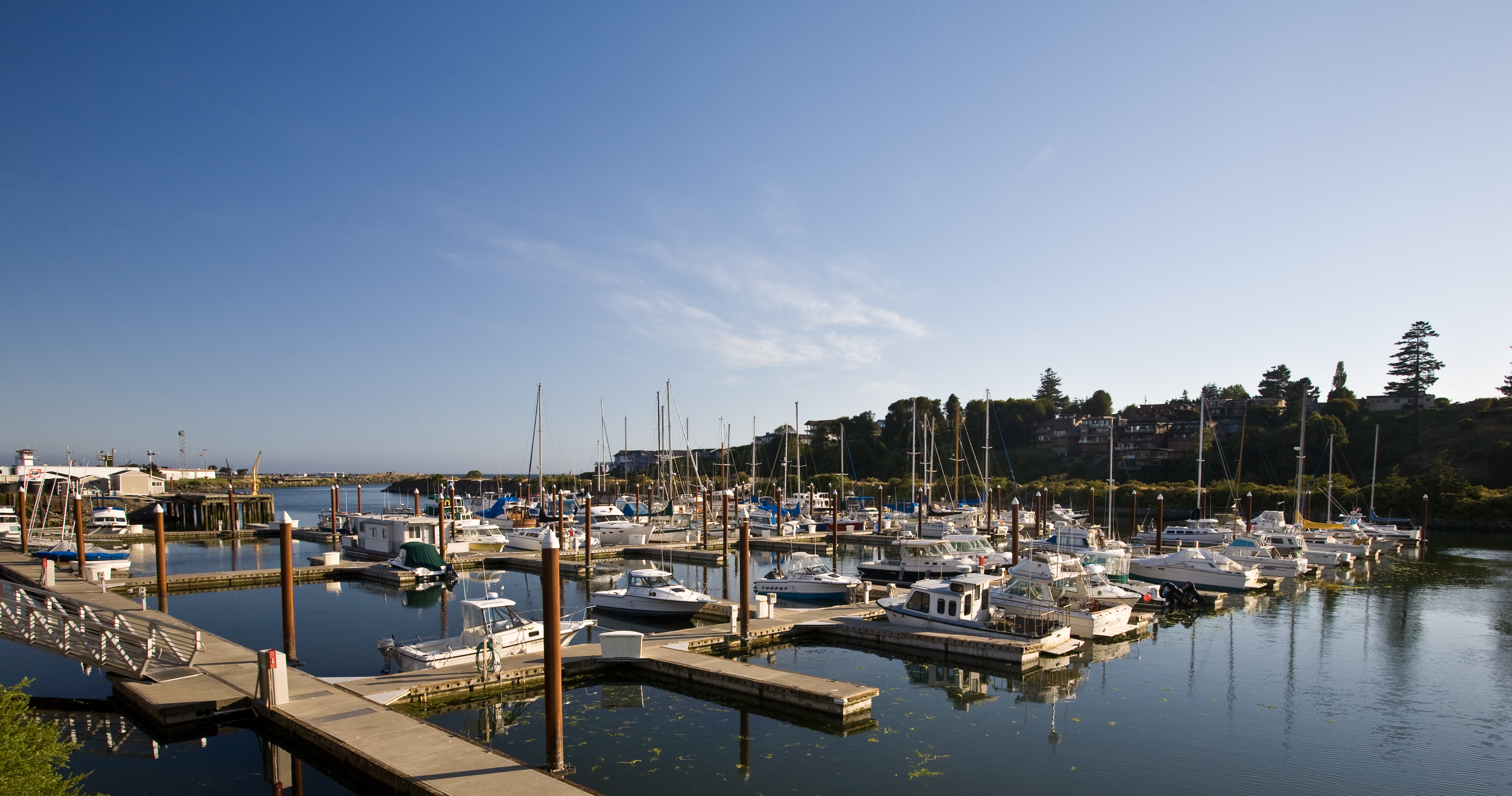
The Brookings harbor

=== Azalea Park ===
Azalea Park is located at 640 Old County Road. It has picnic areas, bandshell, snackshack, gazebo, Kidtown playground, disc golf course, softball and soccer fields, and the Capella by the Sea. Several cultural events in the town are held at Azalea Park.

=== Harris Beach State Park ===
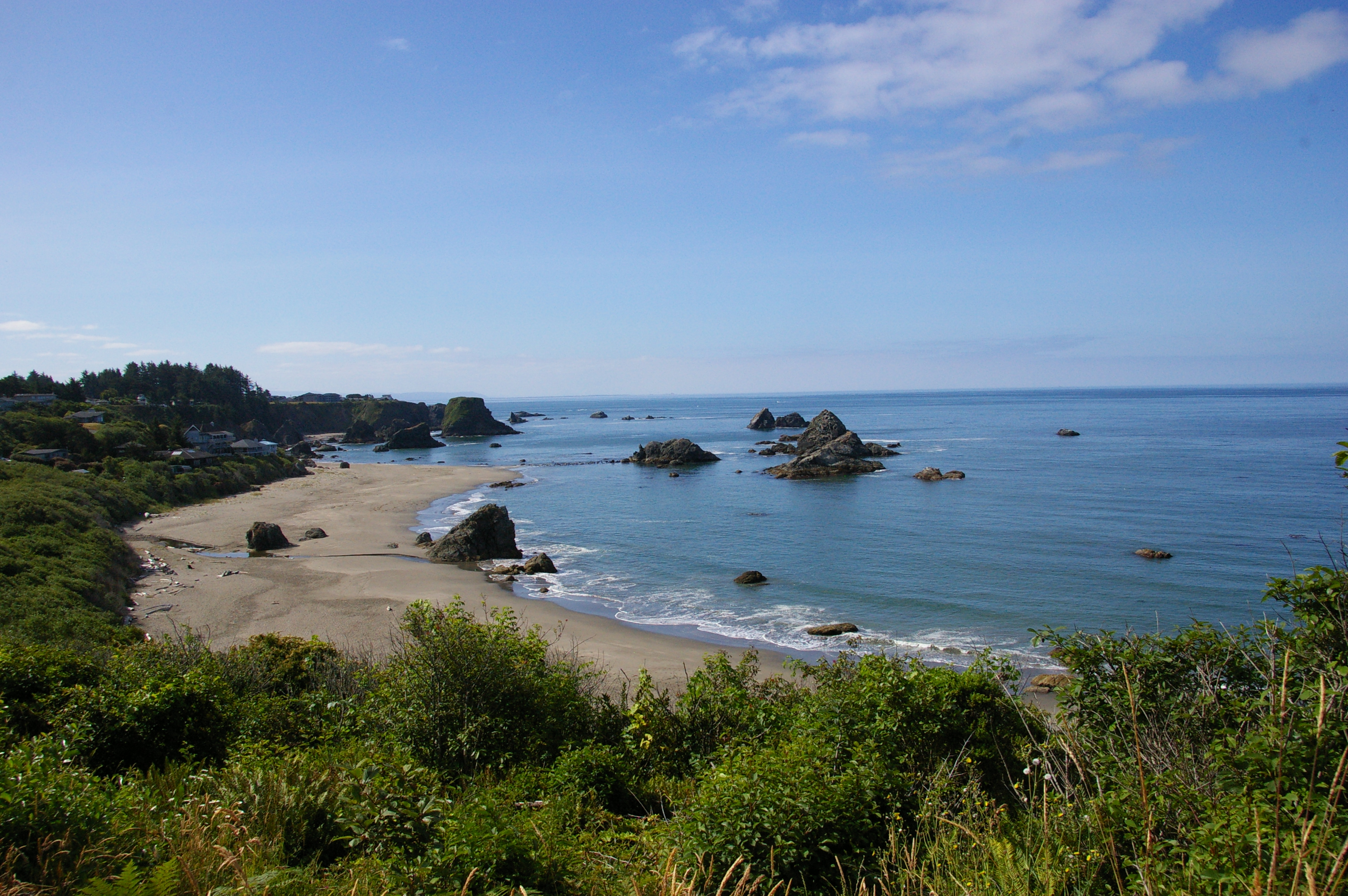
The overlook at Harris Beach State Park

Harris Beach State Park is located on Highway 101 at the north end of Brookings. It includes 173 acres (70 hectares) of coastal access as well as RV and tent camping facilities and a rest area.

== Arts and culture ==
Principal photography for the 2024 film Bad Fish took place in Brookings in 2022. The film featured local landmarks such as Brookings Harbor and Harris Beach State Park.

=== Annual cultural events ===
Each year, the town hosts the "Pirates of the Pacific" festival.

One major event in the town is the Azalea Festival, which includes the Azalea Parade and live music. It is held every year on Memorial Day Weekend.

Another very popular event in Brookings is the Nature's Coastal Holiday light display which is open each evening from Thanksgiving weekend through Christmas in Azalea Park.

== Soup kitchen ==
After a long history of feeding the homeless, the City Council moved against St. Timothy's Episcopal Church for operating a soup kitchen. This was fueled by a feeling within the town that the soup kitchen was drawing "the wrong kind of people" to the area. After a long, drawn-out legal battle, starting in 2021 and culminating in 2024, St. Timothy's Episcopal Church was granted permission by a federal court to continue to operate the soup kitchen.

== Media ==
=== Newspaper ===
- Curry Coastal Pilot

=== Radio ===
- KURY-FM
- KSEP-FM (Brookings Seventh-day Adventist Church)
- KCIW 100.7 FM Curry Coast Community Radio

== Notable people ==
- Ethan Allen (1904–1993) – professional baseball player in Major League Baseball (MLB)
- Dom Callicrate (1885–1979) – college football player
- Ray "Crash" Corrigan (1902–1976) – actor
- Max Steineke (1898–1952) – petroleum geologist
- Elmo Williams (1913–2015) – film and television director and producer
