= Jepson Peak =

Mountain in California, United States

- Jepson Peak
- Location within California

Highest point
- Elevation: 11,209 ft (3,417 m) NAVD 88
- Prominence: 125 ft (38 m)
- Listing: Hundred Peaks Section
- Coordinates: 34°06′10″N 116°50′41″W

Geography
- Location: San Bernardino County, California
- Parent range: San Bernardino Mountains
- Topo map: USGS San Gorgonio Mountain

Climbing
- Easiest route: Strenuous hike, class 1

Jepson Peak is a summit, 1.2 miles (1.9 km) west of San Gorgonio Mountain, in the San Gorgonio Wilderness. It is the second highest summit in Southern California, but most authors would not rank this peak because it has less than 300 feet (91 m) of prominence and does not qualify as an independent peak.

The peak is named for Willis Linn Jepson, who was a University of California botanist and a charter member of the Sierra Club.
