= Bad Fish =

2024 American horror film by Brad Douglas

- Directed by: Brad Douglas
- Written by: Brad Douglas
- Produced by: Brad Douglas; Ray Nomoto Robison
- Starring: Jonny Lee; Mark Schneider; Abby Wathen
- Cinematography: Chuck Greenwood
- Music by: Francesco Tresca
- Production company: Barbed Wire Media
- Distributed by: Uncork'd Entertainment; Dark Star Pictures
- Release date: September 10, 2024
- Running time: 84 minutes
- Country: United States
- Language: English

Bad Fish is a 2024 American independent horror film written, directed, and produced by Brad Douglas. The film centers around a marine biologist investigating attacks by sea life in a small coastal town.

== Plot ==
Marine biologist Dr. John Burton (Jonny Lee) is called to the small coastal town of Harburg, Oregon, to help local sheriff Skip Porter (Mark Schneider) investigate a string of attacks by unknown sea life. Accompanied by his assistant Sandy (Sonya Davis), Burton attempts to figure out what kind of animal could mangle the bodies in such a way. While there, Burton meets the eccentric locals, including bartender Abby (Abby Wathen), a woman who may or may not know more about the attacks than she lets on. The investigation is further complicated by Burton's attraction to Abby, as well as the investigation's connection to the town's dark secret.

== Cast ==
- Jonny Lee as Dr. John Burton
- Mark Schneider as Sheriff Skip Porter
- Abby Wathen as Abby Brand
- Marlyn Mason as Phyllis Brand
- Sonya Davis as Sandy
- Ken Carpenter as Jack Brand
- Greg James as Bill Morgan
- Stephanie C. Jones as Deputy Alice Nelson

== Filming ==
Most filming took place in the town of Brookings, Oregon, and the nearby community of Harbor. Interior shots were also filmed in Crescent City, California. Although the name of the town is given as Harburg, many signs and buildings from Brookings are still shown on-screen.

Citizens of Brookings and Harbor were treated to an early screening of the film at their local theatre on Tuesday, January 16, 2024. According to local paper The Curry Coastal Pilot, the screening was packed, with many of the film's cast and crew attending, and locals often applauded as familiar sites and buildings showed up on-screen.

== Reception ==
The film received a mixed reception from critics.
