= San Bernardino Mountains =

Mountain range of the Transverse Ranges in California, United States

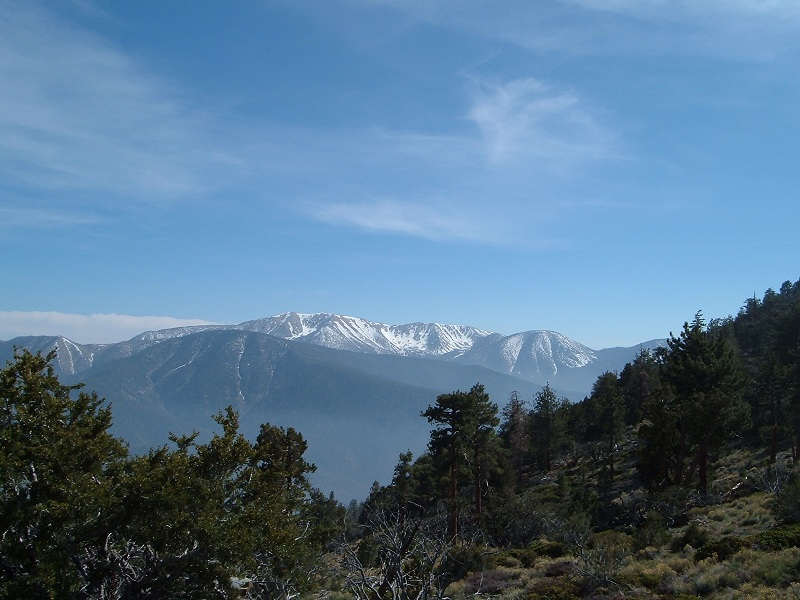
- The San Bernardinos seen from near Sugarloaf Mountain

Highest point
- Peak: San Gorgonio Mountain
- Elevation: 11,503 ft (3,506 m)
- Coordinates: 34°05′57″N 116°49′29″W

Dimensions
- Length: 60 mi (97 km)
- Width: 41 mi (66 km)
- Area: 2,063 mi^{2} (5,340 km^{2})

Geography
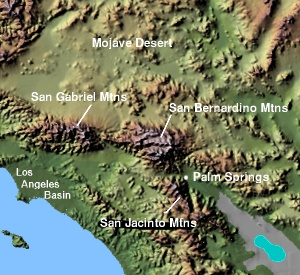
- Country: United States
- State: California
- Counties: San Bernardino; Riverside
- Settlements: San Bernardino; Crestline; Lake Arrowhead; Running Springs; Big Bear Lake
- Range coordinates: 34.2°N 117°W
- Parent range: Transverse Ranges
- Borders on: San Gabriel Mountains; San Jacinto Mountains; Little San Bernardino Mountains

Geology
- Rock ages: Miocene; Quaternary
- Rock types: Fault-block; sedimentary

The San Bernardino Mountains are a high and rugged mountain range in Southern California in the United States. The mountain range is part of the Transverse Ranges and lies north and northeast of San Bernardino and spanning two California counties, the range tops out at 11,503 feet (3,506 m) at San Gorgonio Mountain – the tallest peak in Southern California. The San Bernardinos form a significant region of wilderness and are popular for hiking and skiing.

The mountains were formed about eleven million years ago by tectonic activity along the San Andreas Fault, and are still actively rising. Many local rivers originate in the range, which receives significantly more precipitation than the surrounding desert. The range's unique and varying environment allows it to maintain some of the greatest biodiversity in the state. For over 10,000 years, the San Bernardinos and their surroundings have been inhabited by indigenous peoples, who used the mountains as a summer hunting ground.

Spanish explorers first encountered the San Bernardinos in the late 18th century, naming the eponymous San Bernardino Valley at its base. European settlement of the region progressed slowly until 1860, when the mountains became the focus of the largest gold rush ever to occur in Southern California. Waves of settlers brought in by the gold rush populated the lowlands around the San Bernardinos, and began to tap the mountains' rich timber and water resources on a large scale by the late 19th century.

Recreational development of the range began in the early 20th century, when mountain resorts were built around new irrigation reservoirs. Since then, the mountains have been extensively engineered for transportation and water supply purposes. Four major state highways and the California Aqueduct traverse the mountains today; these developments have all had significant impacts on area wildlife and plant communities.

== Geography and climate ==
The San Bernardinos run for approximately 60 miles (97 km) from Cajon Pass in the northwest – which separates them from the San Gabriel Mountains – to San Gorgonio Pass, across which lie the San Jacinto Mountains, in the southeast. The Morongo Valley in the southeast divides the range from the Little San Bernardino Mountains. Encompassing roughly 2,100 square miles (5,400 km^{2}), the mountains lie mostly in San Bernardino County, with a small southern portion reaching into Riverside County. The range divides three major physiographic regions: the highly urbanized Inland Empire to the southwest, the Coachella Valley in the southeast, and the Mojave Desert to the north. Most of the range lies within the boundaries of the San Bernardino National Forest.

Highest peaks of the San Bernardino Mountains

Peak	Elevation	
	ft	m
San Gorgonio Mountain	11,503	3,506
Jepson Peak	11,205	3,415
Big Draw Peak	11,171	3,405
Bighorn Mountain	10,997	3,352
Dragons Head	10,866	3,312
Anderson Peak	10,840	3,300
Charlton Peak	10,806	3,294
San Bernardino East Peak	10,691	3,259
Shields Peak	10,680	3,260
San Bernardino Peak	10,649	3,246
Alto Diablo	10,563	3,220

From its northwestern end, the crest of the mountains rises steadily until they are interrupted by the gorge of Bear Creek. The northern part of the San Bernardinos is a large upland plateau characterized by a series of extensive subalpine basins, including Big Bear Valley, and is home to several large water supply reservoirs. South of the Big Bear area the range is cut by the Santa Ana Canyon, the broad valley of the Santa Ana River, and rises dramatically to culminate at Mount San Gorgonio and eleven other peaks that exceed 10,000 feet (3,000 m) in elevation. The mountains feature a steep drop into the Coachella Valley and San Gorgonio Pass – the latter of which is one of the deepest mountain passes in the United States, exceeding the Grand Canyon's depth by over 2,000 feet (610 m).

Many cities lie at the base of the San Bernardino Mountains. These include San Bernardino, Redlands and Yucaipa in the south; Yucca Valley to the east; and Hesperia to the northwest. In addition, there are several mid-sized to large towns in the mountains themselves, including Big Bear Lake, Big Bear City, Crestline, Lake Arrowhead and Running Springs. Cities within the San Bernardino Mountains total a population of about 44,000, with this number sometimes increasing tenfold during peak tourist season. Several regional streams and rivers also have their headwaters in the mountains. The principal drainage is provided by the Santa Ana River, which runs westwards into the Pacific Ocean in Orange County. Other streams flowing off the mountains include the Whitewater River, flowing southeast through the Coachella Valley into the Salton Sea, and the Mojave River, which drains northwards into the Mojave Desert.

The San Bernardino Mountains (along with the adjacent San Gabriel and San Jacinto Mountains) are a humid island in the mostly semi-arid southern California coastal plain. Parts of the San Bernardino Mountains have annual precipitation totals in excess of 40 inches (1,000 mm) (e.g. Lake Arrowhead and Barton Flats areas), and provide an important water resource for the coastal plain below. Most of the precipitation falls between November and April; summers are mostly dry except for infrequent thunderstorms during late summer. During the colder winter storms, snow can fall below 1,500 feet (460 m), but most usually falls above 3,000 feet (910 m). Ski resorts (mostly in the Big Bear area) capitalize on this snowfall, the most reliable in California south of the Sierra Nevada Mountains.

== Geology ==
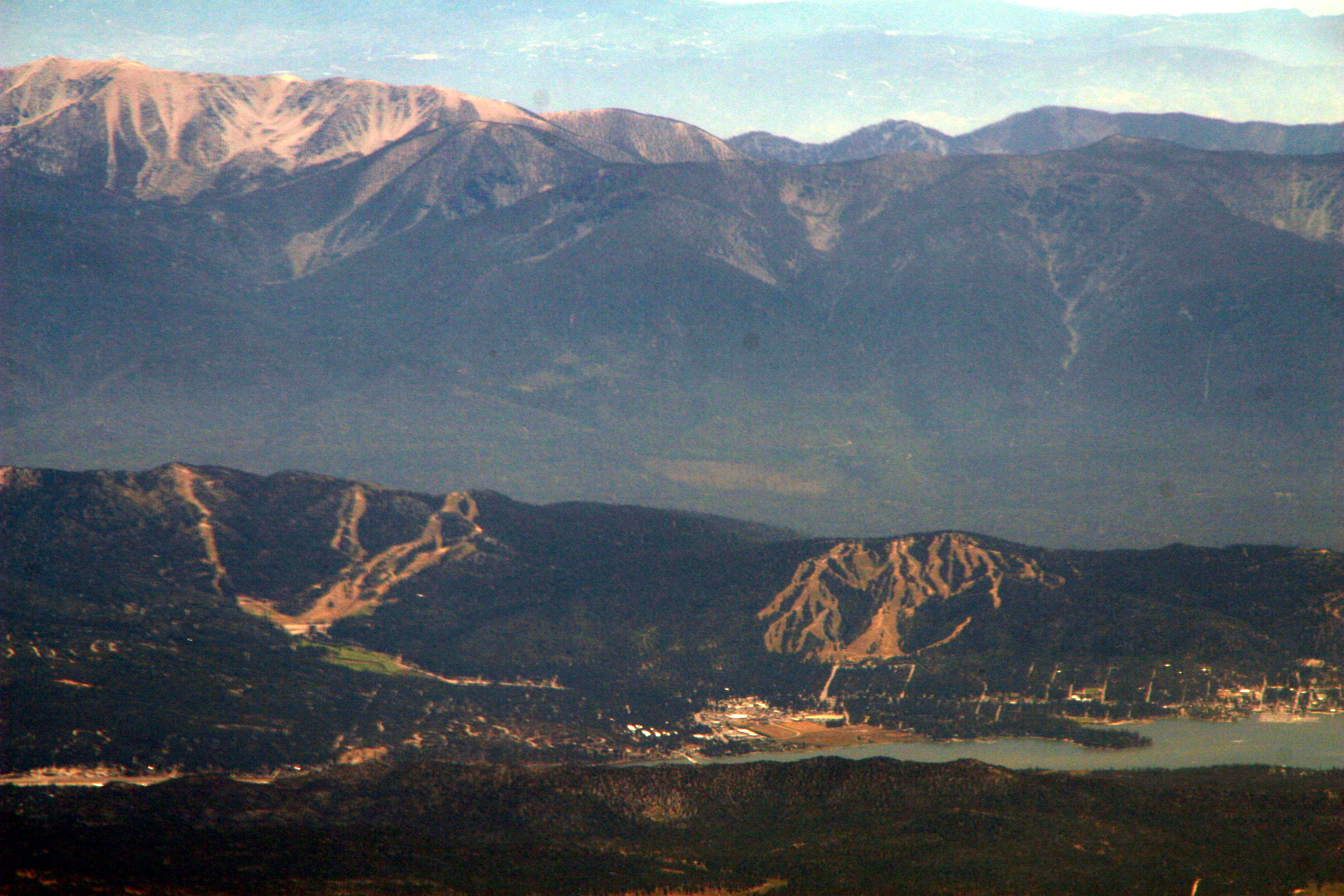
The range seen looking south from the Big Bear Valley

The San Bernardinos are part of the Transverse Ranges of Southern California, a mountain chain formed by tectonic forces between the North American and Pacific Plates along the San Andreas Fault. An early version of the range rose in the Miocene, between eleven and five million years ago, but has largely eroded. The range was shaped into its present form during the Pleistocene epoch beginning approximately two million years ago, with regional uplift continuing to the present. The rocks that make up the mountains are much more ancient than the mountains themselves – ranging from 18 million years to 1.7 billion years old. The San Andreas Fault was also responsible for the formation of both major mountain passes that mark the east and west ends of the range.

These mountains are shaped by several primary tectonic or fault blocks – the Big Bear block, which forms the large montane plateau that characterizes the northern portions of the range; and the more complex and fractured San Gorgonio, Wilson Creek and Yucaipa Ridge blocks, which form the rugged and heavily dissected southern parts of the mountains. Because of their large, steep rise above the surrounding terrain, the San Bernardinos have been subject to great amounts of erosion that have carved out numerous river gorges. Rocks and sediment from the mountains are deposited on the surrounding valley floors as massive alluvial fans. Regional alluvial deposits can reach depths of 1,000 feet (300 m) or more, and their permeable soils constitute several major groundwater basins.

== History ==
=== Indigenous peoples ===
Archaeological discoveries in the San Bernardino Valley suggest that humans have populated the region for at least 10,000-12,000 years. Several Native American groups held the lands surrounding the San Bernardinos. These included the Tongva, who occupied the Inland Empire area southwest of the mountains; the Cahuilla, who lived in the Coachella Valley and Salton Sea basin; and the Serrano and Chemehuevi peoples, whose territory comprised land north and northeast of the San Bernardinos, adjacent to the Mojave Desert. Most of these tribes did not have permanent settlements in the mountains, with the possible exception of a few groups of Serrano.

Indigenous peoples traveled into the mountains in the summer to hunt deer and rabbits, gather acorns, berries and nuts, and seek refuge from the desert heat. They established well-traveled trade routes, some of which were later used by Europeans to explore and settle the region. The precipitous Mojave Road (or Mojave Trail) crested the San Bernardinos east of Cajon Pass and permitted trade between people of the Inland Empire basin and the Mojave Desert. San Gorgonio Pass, which forms the largest natural break in the Transverse Ranges, also allowed interaction between coastal and desert tribes. River canyons, especially those of the Mojave and Santa Ana, provided the major means of entry to the mountains. Many archaeological sites have been discovered along Deep Creek, a tributary of the Mojave River, in particular.

=== History ===
During the 17th and 18th centuries, various Spanish explorers passed through coastal Southern California and claimed the area for Spain. In 1769, the Spanish government began an effort to bring what they called Alta California under their control and introduce Christianity to native peoples through the construction of missions. It was not until 1772 when the military governor of Alta California, Pedro Fages, became the first European known to reach the San Bernardino Mountains. Although the original purpose of his expedition was to pursue deserters from the Spanish army, he ended up venturing into not just the San Bernardinos but also the San Jacinto Mountains, the Mojave Desert, and eventually north into the Central Valley.

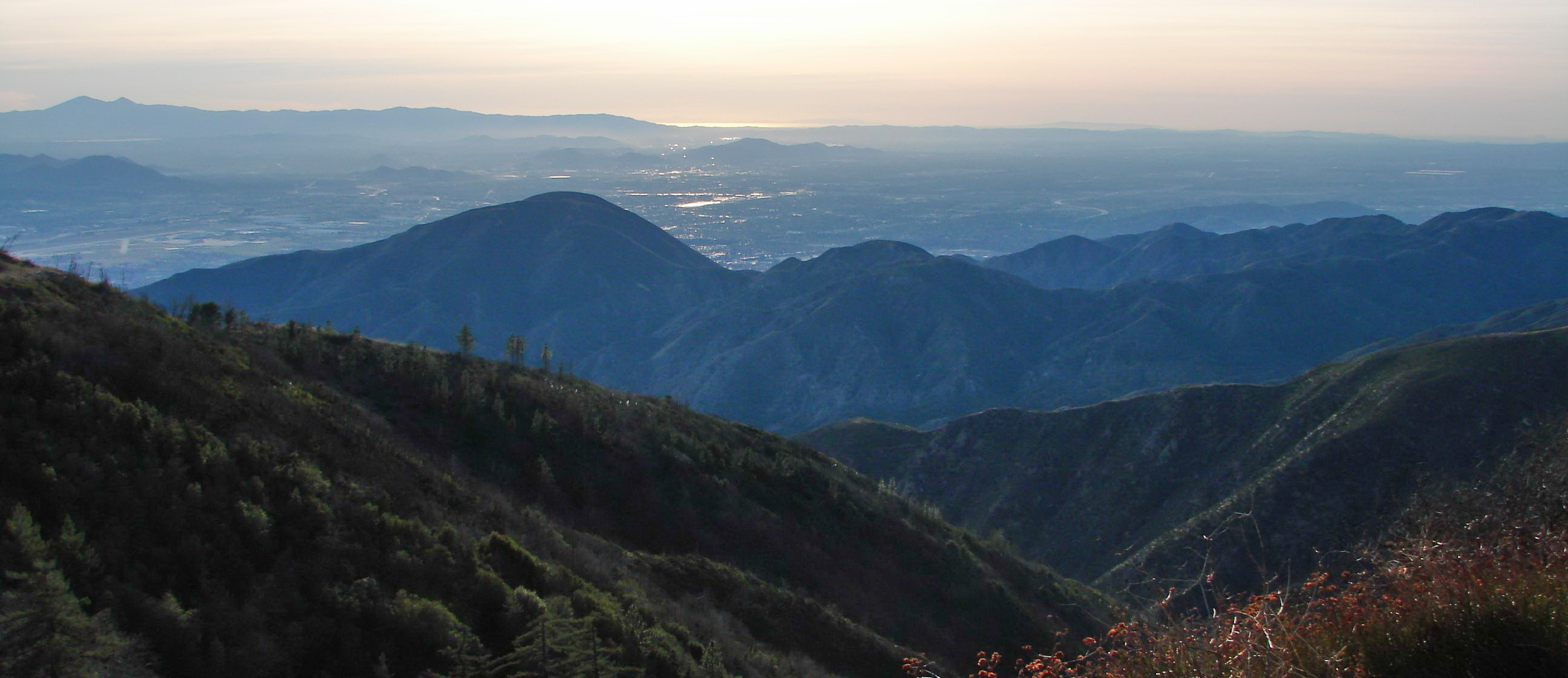
The mountains are named for the San Bernardino Valley, in turn named by the Spanish in 1810

The San Bernardinos and their surrounds were sporadically explored throughout the next 50 years or so - first by Francisco Garcés, the first known European to use the Mojave Road, in 1776, followed by José Maria de Zalvidea, who surveyed the Mojave River area in 1806. In 1810, Francisco Dumetz led a small company to build a temporary chapel near what is now Redlands. On May 20, the Feast Day of Bernardino of Siena, Dumetz named the San Bernardino Valley. This name was applied to San Bernardino Peak by 1835, and was in wide use for the entire range by 1849.

In 1819, San Bernardino de Sena Estancia was created near present-day San Bernardino as an outpost of nearby Mission San Gabriel Arcángel. Although sometimes referred to as an asistencia, or "a mission on a small scale with all the requisites for a mission, and with Divine Service held regularly on days of obligation, except that it lacked a resident priest", San Bernardino was an estancia, or cattle ranch. In 1820, a 12-mile-long (19 km) irrigation ditch or "zanja" was dug using Native American labor to furnish water from Mill Creek, a major stream flowing out of the San Bernardinos, to the estancia and surrounding croplands. For the next twenty years, the Spanish – then the Californios under newly independent Mexico – practiced agriculture and ranching at the foot of the mountains.

The high country of the mountains remained largely unexplored until 1845, when Benjamin D. Wilson led a party of 22 men from a rancho near present-day Riverside to catch several Mohave cattle rustlers who had fled into the mountains. Wilson was the first recorded European to see the Big Bear Valley, and named Bear Lake (today's Baldwin Lake) for the abundance of California grizzly in the area. The party captured and skinned more than twenty bears. Later, they found and arrested the rustlers, who were hiding along the Mojave River. Wilson's expedition opened the interior of the San Bernardinos to later exploration, and discouraged Native Americans such as the Mohave from staging similar raids over the mountains.

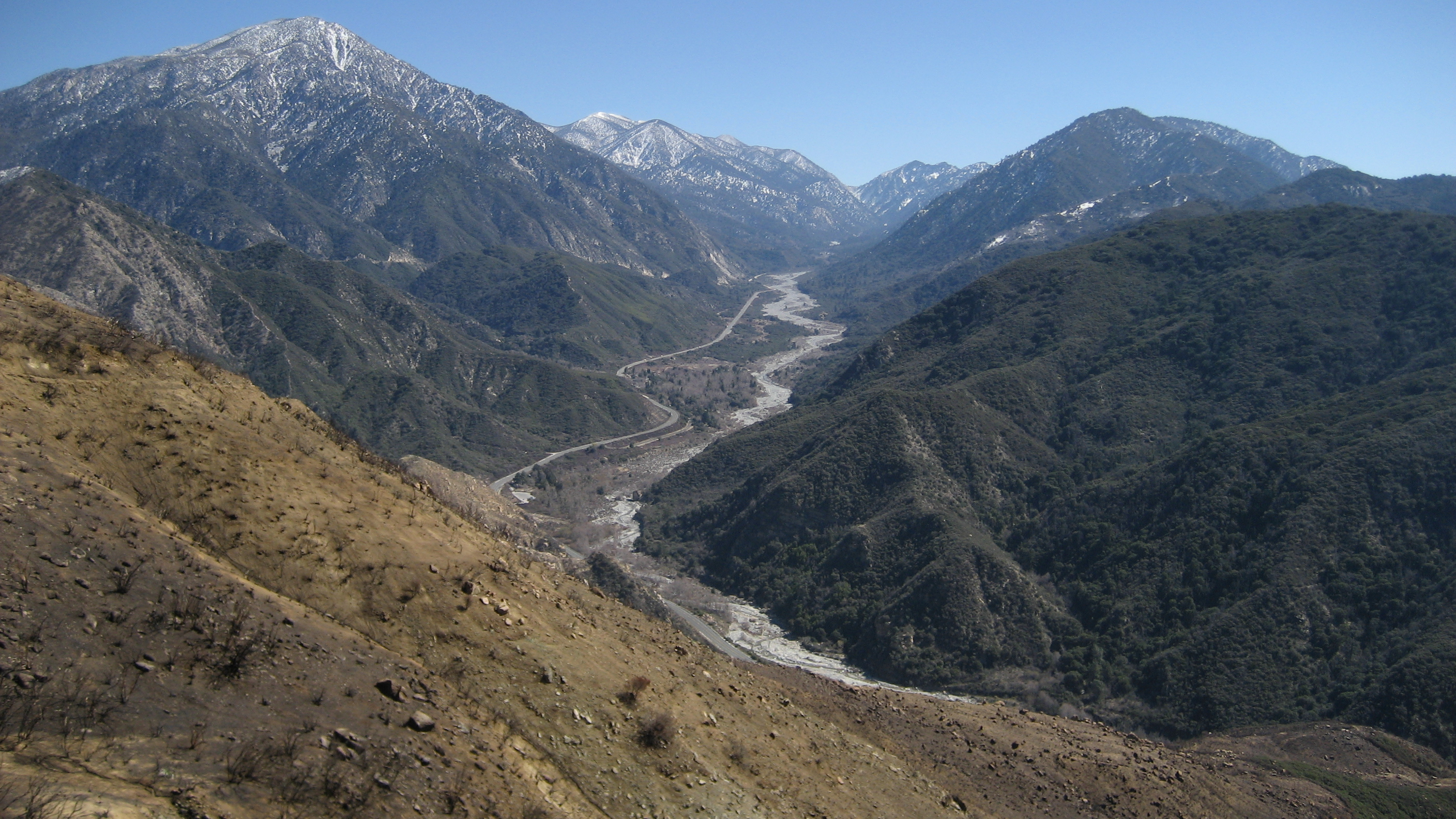
The Mill Creek valley was the first area of the mountains to be logged.

Beginning in 1851, Mormon colonists began emigrating to the San Bernardino Valley. The Mormons bought and subsequently split up Rancho San Bernardino, and greatly improved the area's agricultural production by bringing in thousands of head of livestock and overhauling the local irrigation network. In order to obtain lumber for their settlements, they also began the first large-scale logging operations in the San Bernardino Mountains, starting in the Mill Creek valley. Luis Vignes built the first sawmill in the range sometime between 1851 and 1853. By 1854, six lumber mills were in operation in the mountains, some as high as the crest of the range three-quarters of a mile above San Bernardino, accessed by a twisting road through Waterman Canyon. Some of these mills were driven by waterwheels, although most were steam powered. This activity is memorialized by the Mormon Lumber Road monument.

The largest logging operation by far was that of Brookings Lumber & Box Company. Beginning in 1899, the company produced 10-12 board feet of lumber annually on 8,000 acres in the Running Springs area. It built a logging railroad from Heaps Peak to Green Valley Lake to bring logs to its mill at Fredalba.

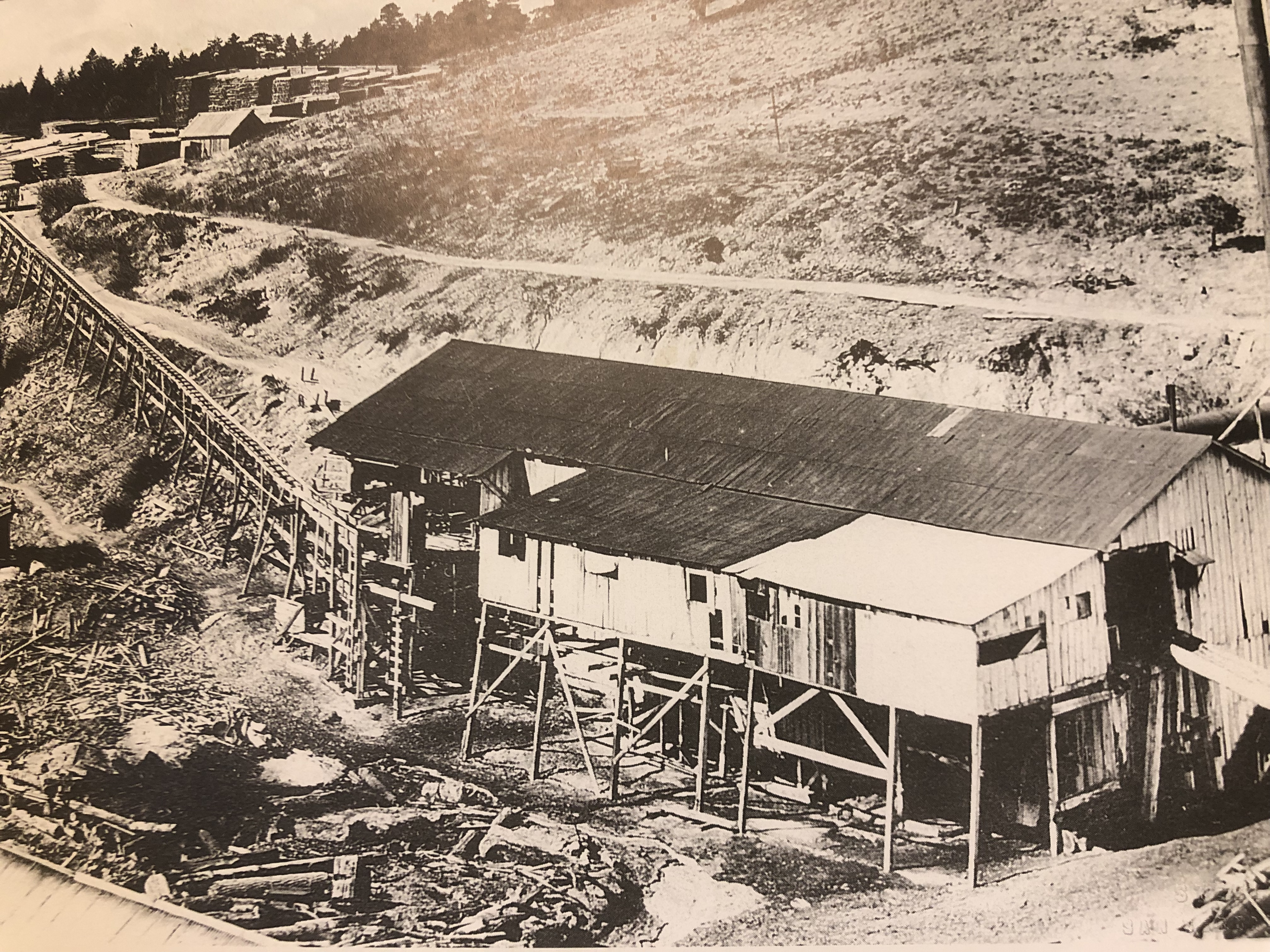
Brookings Lumber & Box Company sawmill at Fredalba. The drying yard is at left, and the mill pond is at right (out of the photo).

Prospectors William F. Holcomb and Ben Choteau's 1860 discovery of gold on Holcomb Creek kicked off a flood of gold seekers to the San Bernardino Mountains. Mining boomtowns, including Belleville, Clapboard Town, Union Town, Bairdstown and Doble, were established almost overnight. Belleville even exceeded the population of San Bernardino itself for a short time and narrowly lost to the latter city for election as the county seat. Numerous mills and processing plants were constructed in the area, which became known as Holcomb Valley. In 1873, Eli "Lucky" Baldwin built California's largest stamp mill in Holcomb Valley. Although another major gold strike was made in that same year, area deposits petered out by the 1880s, and the mountains were quickly depopulated, with most of the miners settling down in the San Bernardino Valley and the Mojave Desert near present-day Hesperia. Many structures built by miners, including chutes, sluices and a few cabins, can still be found in the area today.

=== Reservoirs and recreation ===
In 1880, Frank Elwood Brown designed the first dam in the Big Bear Valley, forming Big Bear Lake – the world's largest artificial reservoir at the time – to supply water to citrus farms around San Bernardino. By 1910, a new dam had been built, increasing the size of the lake threefold. An unintended effect of the lake was to dramatically increase tourism in the San Bernardino Mountains, and its shores were developed with lodges and visitor facilities by the 1920s. The old logging camp of Big Bear Lake was expanded to accommodate increasing numbers of tourists from all over Southern California.

Originally proposed in 1891 by the Arrowhead Reservoir and Power Company – and reportedly inspired by the success of the Big Bear Lake project – Lake Arrowhead was to be one of a series of three reservoirs that would divert water draining off the northwestern San Bernardino Mountains into the San Bernardino Valley, and furnish water to a 260 kW hydroelectric plant. Although the project was never completed to full extent, Arrowhead became one of the most popular fishing destinations in Southern California. In the early 20th century, John Baylis built the Pinecrest Resort on Lake Arrowhead. This was followed by several other tourist developments, including the Skyland Inn and Thousand Pines Camp. Most early tourists arrived by stagecoach, though in time the old Mormon logging road through Waterman Canyon was overhauled, allowing for the passage of automobiles.

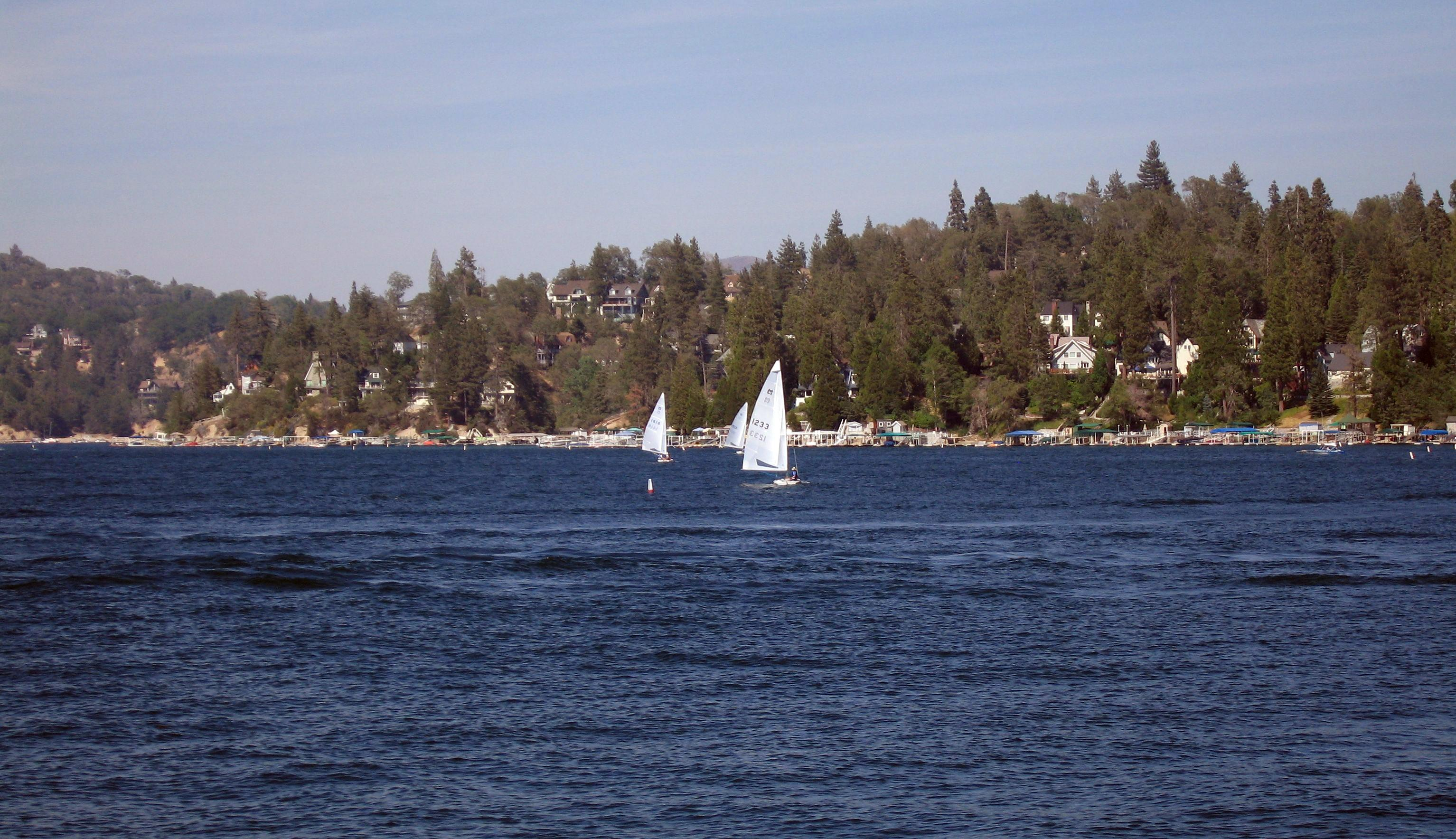
Lake Arrowhead in July 2007.

Development of resorts also proliferated on rivers and high mountain valleys. The Seven Oaks Camp was established on the banks of the Santa Ana River in 1890, and resorts also grew up at Crestline and Running Springs in higher regions of the San Bernardino Mountains. Snow in the San Bernardinos was seen as an obstacle before the 1920s and practically shut down recreation in the winter. However, more and more Southern Californians braved the dangers of winter travel in the mountains, and Lake Arrowhead became a sought-after winter destination by the 1930s.

Skiing did not become a popular recreational activity in the mountains until a simple sling lift was built at Big Bear in 1938. By 1949, a 3,000-foot-long (910 m) chair lift was built, hugely increasing the amount of skiers the area's resorts could accommodate. Known as the Lynn Lift, it operated until 1970, but was demolished in 1981 due to its limited capacity. Tommi Tyndall, who founded ski schools at Big Bear, Mill Creek, Snow Summit and Sugarloaf Mountain, is widely credited for introducing and later advocating the sport in the San Bernardino Mountains, as well as for bringing snowmaking technology, without which the present-day ski industry would be severely crippled during dry winters.

== Infrastructure ==
=== Transportation ===
During the early 20th century, the roads that serviced the San Bernardino Mountains were steep and narrow. Conflicts occurred between those who believed that the automobile could provide fast and cheap transportation up the steep grades of the mountains, and those who worried that cars were dangerous and would cause accidents with the stagecoaches then in use. In 1908, W.C. Vaughan drove up the Waterman Canyon road to Lake Arrowhead in protest of county restrictions, with police in hot pursuit. In spite of a total ban on automobiles imposed by the county the following year, Jack Heyser took a car down the narrow stage roads around modern-day Crestline in 1910, proving that the mountains could be safely serviced by automobiles.

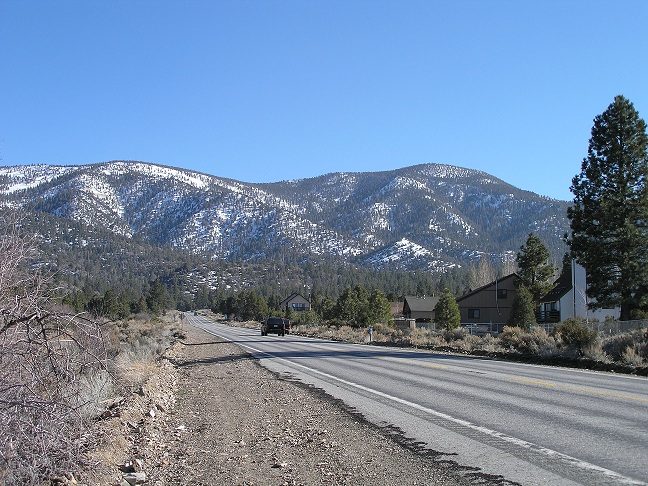
State Route 38 in Santa Ana Canyon, with Sugarloaf Mountain rising in the distance

By 1911, cars had largely replaced horse-drawn carts as the primary mode of transport in the mountains, and new toll roads were constructed through the range to service them. Among the first were roads through Cajon Pass, City Creek Canyon (SR 330), and Mill Creek and Santa Ana Canyons (SR 38). The largest and most famous road through the San Bernardinos – California State Route 18, more popularly known as the Rim of the World Highway for 107 miles (172 km) as it winds through the mountains – was dedicated on July 18, 1915. Traveling from Crestline through Big Bear City and north into the Mojave Desert, the Rim of the World Highway is one of the most spectacular roads in Southern California, affording motorists wide views of the San Bernardino Valley, Santa Ana Canyon, and Big Bear Lake.

=== Water management ===
In the late 1950s, work began on the California Aqueduct, a massive system of canals and pipelines designed to bring water from Northern California to growing cities in the parched south. The East Branch of the aqueduct passes over the San Bernardino Mountains through a complex arrangement of pumping stations, reservoirs and power stations. The aqueduct feeds Silverwood Lake, a large reservoir created by the construction of a dam on the northern flank of the San Bernardinos in 1973. From Silverwood, the water passes through the mountains via the San Bernardino Tunnel, and drops down to the Devil Canyon Power Plant in the San Bernardino Valley, using the enormous hydraulic head afforded by the mountains to generate up to 276 MW of power.

The streams of the San Bernardino Mountains are also prone to flash floods, a danger that has prompted the construction of numerous flood control dams throughout the range. The largest of these is Seven Oaks Dam – the sixth highest dam in the United States – on the Santa Ana River. In 1969, the U.S. Army Corps of Engineers deemed the Santa Ana the greatest flood threat in the United States west of the Mississippi River because of its course through heavily developed areas. Completed in 1999, the dam is designed to completely contain a 350-year flood. Many other dams, including Mojave Forks Dam on the Mojave River and various retention basins and check dams on smaller drainages, provide more localized flood and sediment control.

== Ecology and wildlife ==
The San Bernardino Mountains, along with the nearby San Gabriel and San Jacinto ranges, is considered a sky island – a high mountain region whose plants and animals vary dramatically from those in the surrounding semi-arid lands. The San Bernardinos in particular comprise the largest forested region in Southern California, and support some 1,600 species of plants. Foothill regions are primarily composed of chaparral and evergreen oak woodland communities, with a transition to forests of deciduous oak, yellow pine, Jeffrey pine, incense cedar and several fir species at elevations above 5,000 feet (1,500 m). Deeper within the mountains, perennial streams fed by springs and lakes nourish stands of alders, willows and cottonwoods.

About 440 species of wildlife inhabit the mountains, including many endangered species such as the San Bernardino flying squirrel, California Spotted Owl, Mountain yellow-legged frog, Southern rubber boa, and Andrew's marbled butterfly. The mountains once had an abundant population of California grizzly, but hunting eliminated their populations by 1906. Black bears roam the highlands today, but they are not native to the region: they were imported from the Sierra Nevada by the California Department of Fish and Game in the 1930s, in part to attract tourists to the mountains.

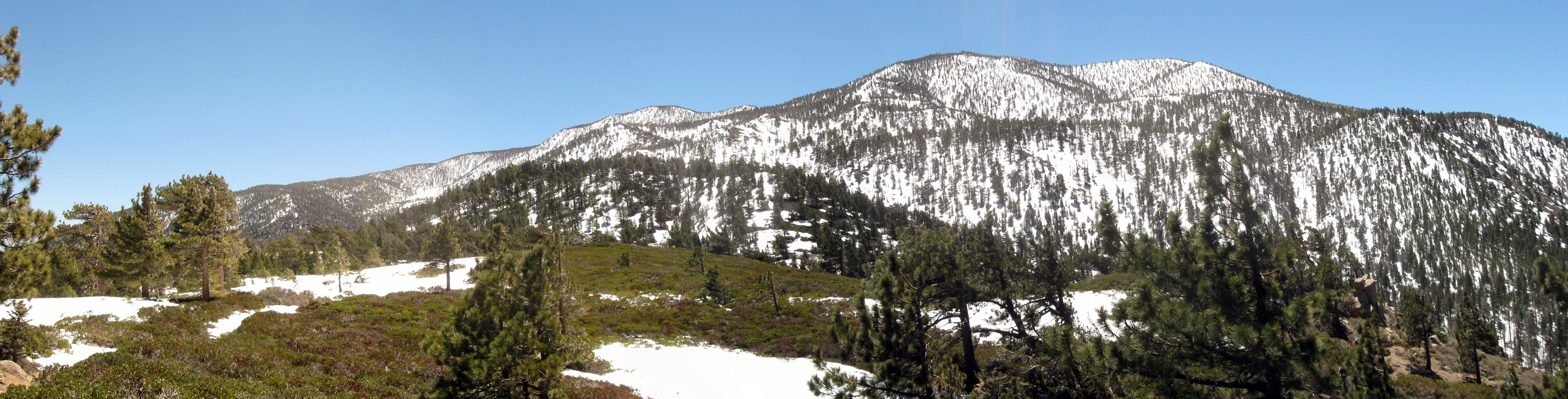
Panorama of San Bernardino Peak, a subsidiary peak of San Gorgonio Mountain

== See also ==
- List of mountain ranges of California
- San Gorgonio Wilderness
- Santa Ana Mountains

== Works cited ==
- Brewer, Chris (2001). Historic Kern County: An Illustrated History of Bakersfield and Kern County. HPN Books. ISBN 1-893619-14-1.
- Gudde, Erwin G.; Bright, William (2004). California Place Names: The Origin and Etymology of Current Geographical Names. University of California Press. ISBN 0-520-24217-3.
- Guinn, James Miller (1902). Historical and biographical record of southern California. Chapman Publishing Co.
- Gunther, Vanessa Ann (2006). Ambiguous justice: Native Americans and the law in Southern California, 1848-1890. MSU Press. ISBN 0-87013-779-4.
- Grinnell, Joseph (1908). The biota of the San Bernardino Mountains. The University Press.
- Hall, Clarence A. (2007). Introduction to the Geology of Southern California and its Native Plants. University of California Press. ISBN 978-0-520-24932-5.
- Hatheway, Roger G. (2007). Rim of the World Drive. Images of America. Arcadia Publishing. ISBN 978-0-7385-4770-1.
- Holtzclaw, Kenneth M. (2006). San Gorgonio Pass. Images of America. Arcadia Publishing. ISBN 0-7385-3097-2.
- Hoover, Mildred Brooke; Kyle, Douglas E. (2002). Historic spots in California. Stanford University Press. ISBN 0-8047-4482-3.
- Keller, Russell L. (2008). Big Bear. Images of America. Arcadia Publishing. ISBN 978-0-7385-5912-4.
- Lancaster, Nicholas (2003). Paleoenvironments and Paleohydrology of the Mojave and Southern Great Basin Deserts. Geological Society of America. ISBN 0-8137-2368-X.
- Massey, Peter; Wilson, Jeanne (2006). Backcountry Adventures Southern California: The Ultimate Guide to the Backcountry for Anyone with a Sport Utility Vehicle. Adlers Publishing. ISBN 1-930193-26-2.
- Olander, Ann (2005). Call of the Mountains: The Beauty and Legacy of Southern California's San Jacinto, San Bernardino and San Gabriel Mountains. Stephens Press. ISBN 1-932173-46-3.
- Robinson, John; Harris, David Money (2006). San Bernardino Mountain Trails: 100 Hikes in Southern California (6 ed.). Wilderness Press. ISBN 0-89997-409-0.
- Storer, Tracy Irwin; Tevis, Lloyd Pacheco (1996). California Grizzly. University of California Press. ISBN 0-520-20520-0.
- Tetley, Rhea-Frances (2005). Lake Arrowhead. Images of America. Arcadia Publishing. ISBN 0-7385-2918-4.
- Weber, Francis J., ed. (1988). El Caminito Real: A Documentary History of California's Estancias. Archdiocese of Los Angeles.
