= Brookings Lumber & Box Company =

Brookings Lumber & Box Company was founded in 1899. It purchased the Highland Box & Lumber Company, and expanded the operation. It was by far the largest timber company in the San Bernardino Mountains of Southern California, producing 10-12 million board feet annually from 1899 to 1912.

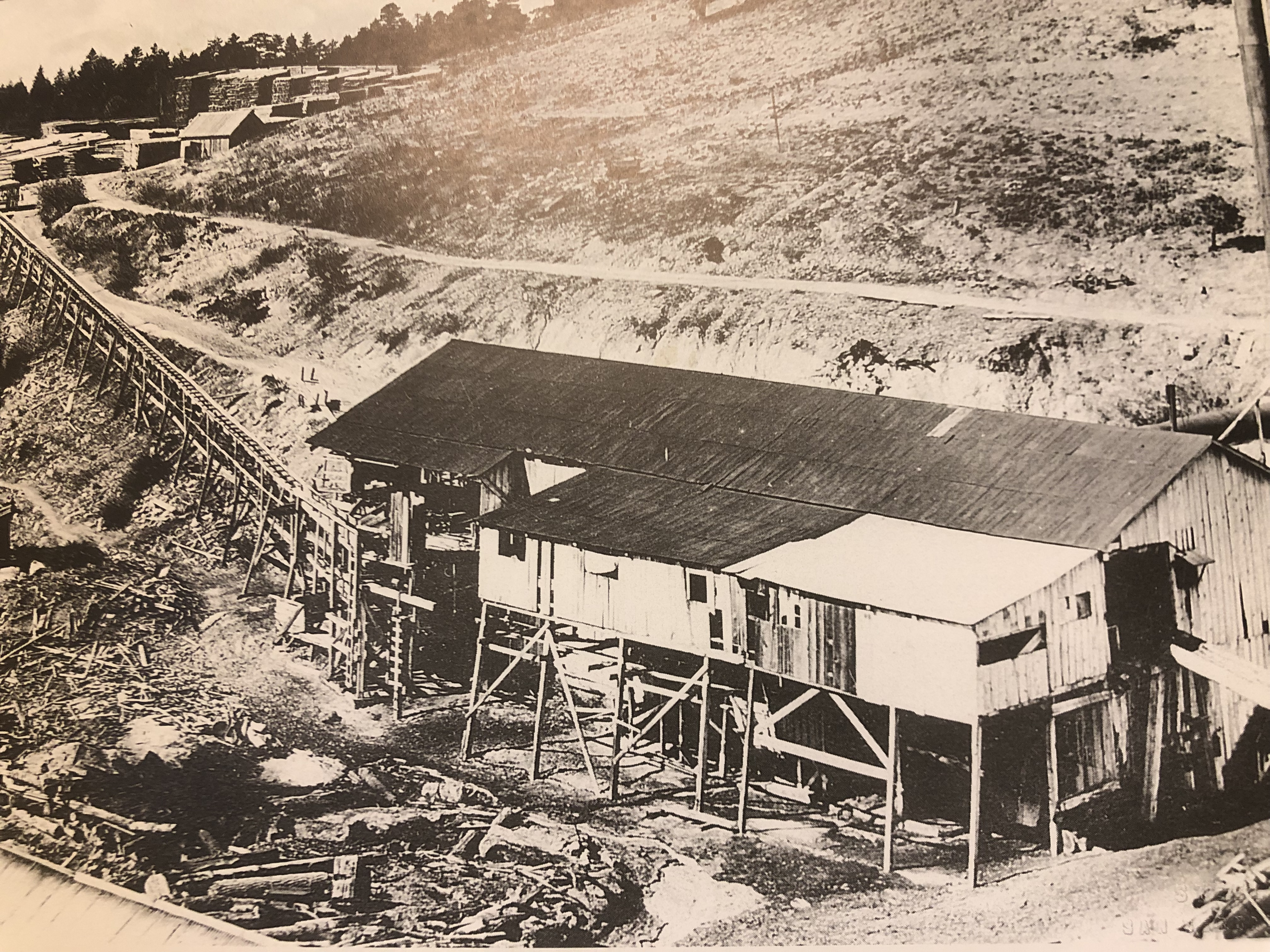
Brookings sawmill at Fredalba, California. The drying yard is at the left, and the mill pond is to the right (out of the photo).

== History ==
Logging in the San Bernardino Mountains goes back to 1819 in the Spanish period of California history. In 1892, Highland Box & Lumber Company began operations there in the City Creek area. Growing to a firm with several hundred employees, it operated an open-air sawmill at Fredalba, California, and also a box factory at Molino (just east of Highland, California), which was served by the Santa Fe Railway, as well as a 10-mile toll road connecting the two.

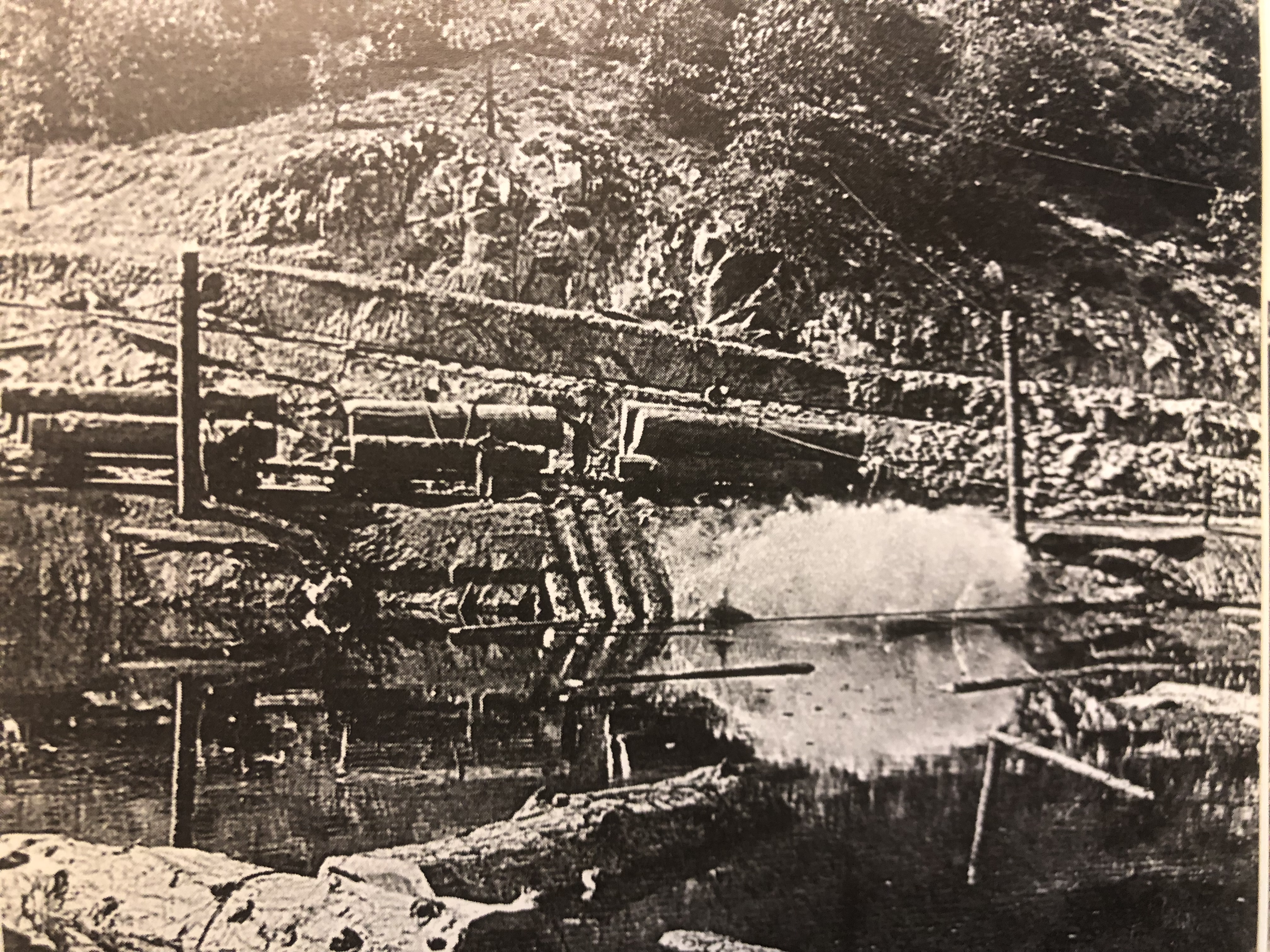
Logs brought by rail from the woods were dumped into the mill pond at Fredalba.

In 1898, J. E. Brookings made a deal to purchase the Highland operation, and the Brookings Lumber & Box Company was formed. The company leased an additional 3,000 acres of timber from the federal government, bringing its total to 8,000 acres.

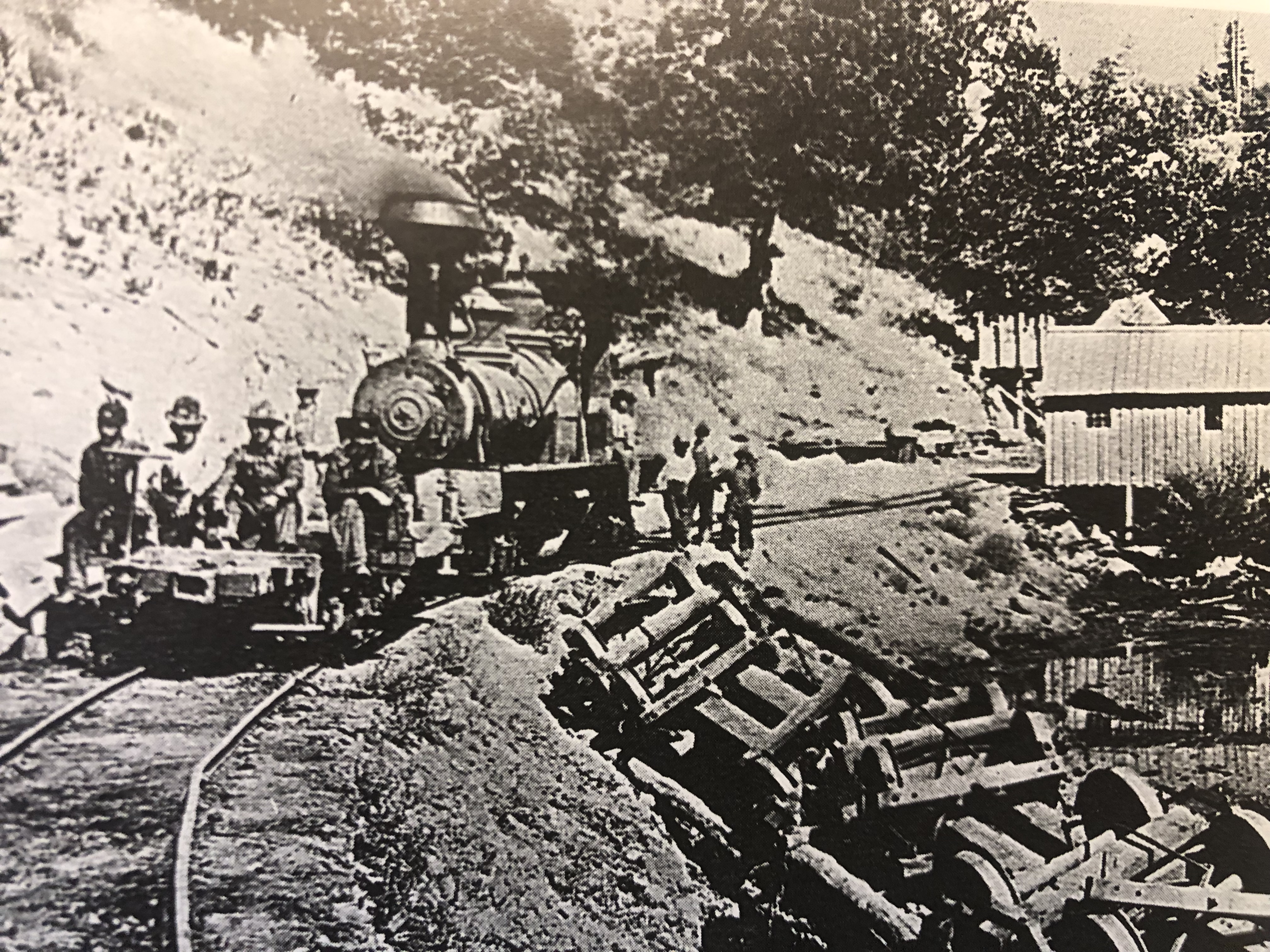
Occasionally accidents occurred when unloading logs into the mill pond. Note the overturned log cars.

The company built a narrow-gauge railroad in the high country that ran from Heaps Peak in the west to Green Valley Lake in the east, and to the company's mill at Fredalba in the south. The railroad hauled logs from the woods to the mill, but did not connect with any other railroad. The logs were dumped into the mill pond, then sawn into boards, and dried. The finished lumber was transported down the mountain on the firm's City Creek toll road by wagon. The grades on the road were 25% in places.

The company's railroad was built on a route that is roughly the same as today's Rim of the World Highway in the area of Running Springs, California. The railroad began with one Shay locomotive and 20 log cars, and later purchased two more Shays. Shays were geared engines that ran at slow speeds (four miles per hour, but could operate on steep grades).

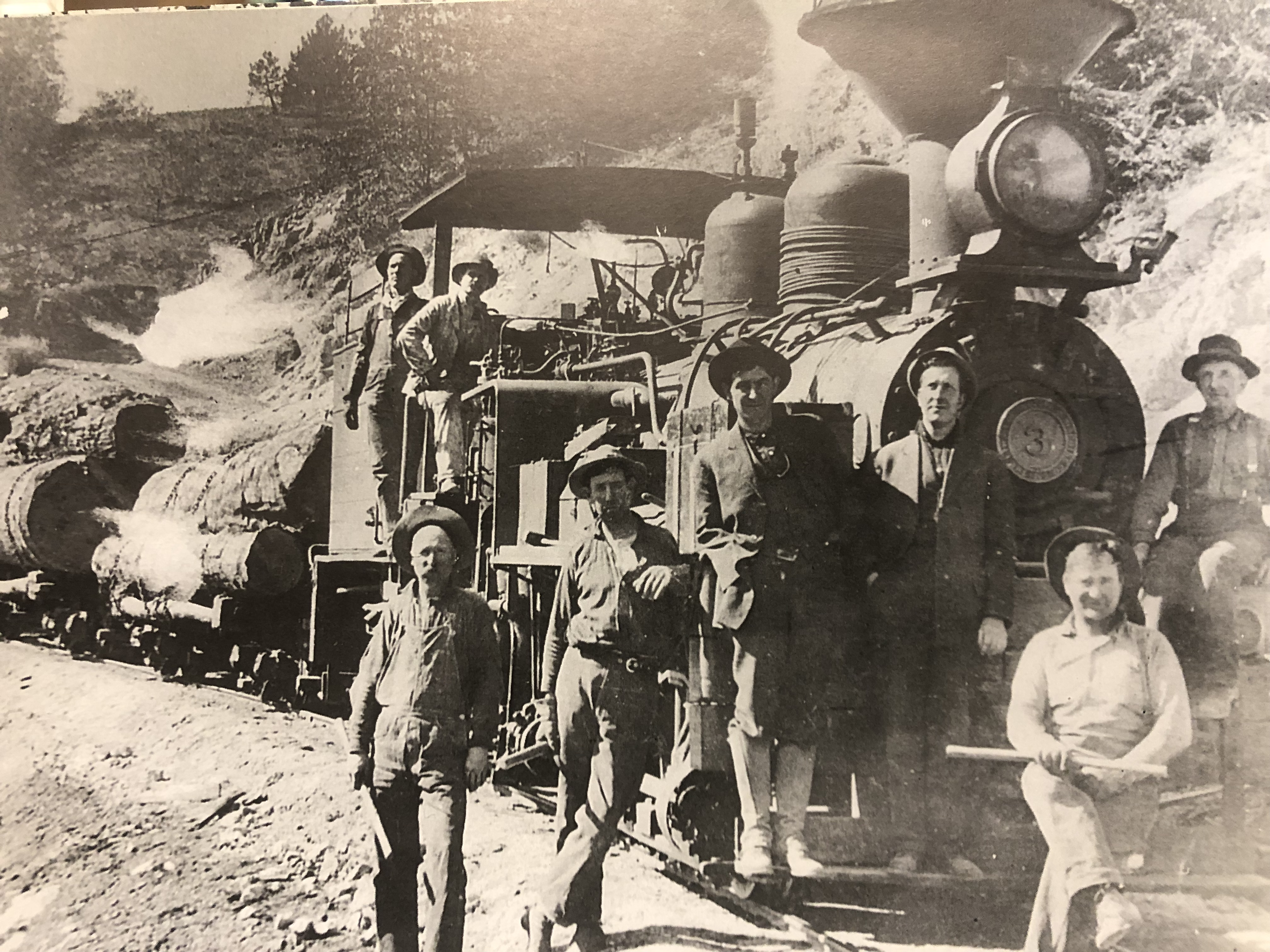
Engine #3 at the mill site at Fredalba.

About 60% of the company's lumber production went to its box factory at Molino which produced “shook.” Shook was used for making citrus crates, and was shipped “knocked down” to packing houses in Southern California, which assembled it into crates. The remaining 40% of the company's production went into molding, flooring and other finished lumber which was sold at its retail lumber yard in San Bernardino, California.

In 1907, Brookings took over a sawmill in Oregon, and the town there was named Brookings in 1908. By 1912, the company had logged most of the timber on its lands in the San Bernardino Mountains, and focused more on the Oregon operations. In 1914, it closed its Southern California facilities and shipped most of the equipment to Oregon.

In 1912, Brookings started construction of the first railroad in Curry County, Oregon, as well as a mill, and deep-water harbor. In 1913, Brookings Timber & Land Company was formed to operate the Oregon property. In 1915, the company merged with the owner of a large block of redwood timber land in northern Del Norte County, California, and formed into the California & Oregon Lumber Company.
