= Beverly Law =

Forest ecologist

Beverly Elizabeth Law
- Born: St. Paul, Minnesota
- Education: Oregon State University
- Scientific career
- Workplaces: Oregon State University
- Thesis: Remote sensing of radiation intercepted by vegetation to estimate aboveground net primary production across western Oregon (1994)
- Doctoral advisor: Richard Waring

Beverly Law is an American forest scientist. She is professor emeritus at Oregon State University known for her research on forest ecosystems, especially with respect to carbon cycling, fire, and how human actions impact future climate.

== Early life and education ==
Law was born in St. Paul, Minnesota and grew up on a lake where her grandfather taught her about the woods. His professional experience in preserving nature spaces within the Twin Cities and working with Minnesota state parks influenced her interests in forest ecology. She describes herself as someone who loved birds, forests, and being outdoors. Going to college, she was split between marine biology and forest ecology, but decided on forest ecology after taking a class from Katherine Ewel. She earned her B.S. in forest management from the University of Florida in 1980. After college she worked at multiple places including AT&T, the University of Florida, and the Environmental Protection Agency in Oregon before going to Oregon State University where she earned her PhD. in forest science from Oregon State University in 1993.

== Career ==
Following her Ph.D., Law was a postdoc at Oregon State University in the College of Oceanic & Atmospheric Sciences until 1998 when she joined the faculty of the College of Forestry at Oregon State University. In 2006 she was promoted to professor; as of 2021 Law is professor emeritus at Oregon State University.

In a 2018 oral history interview, Law noted that she was always interested in a policy component to her research because the research is funded by tax payer dollars, and this is evident when she discusses retaining large, old growth trees that can capture carbon through presentations to Congress, presentations at websites, and newspapers.

== Research ==
Law's research combines direct measurements of forest data, remote sensing, and modeling that spans from regional to global scales. Her Ph.D. research established the metrics needed to estimate aerial coverage of different types of vegetation from space and then used that information to assess net primary production in Oregon. At Oregon State, she quantified temporal changes in respiration in a pine forest through measuring changes in carbon dioxide levels. While building the equipment needed to measure photosynthesis in this project she realized that the spikes in carbon dioxide were caused by cars waiting at a nearby traffic light which she described as an "ah-ha" moment that expanded her interest in global change research.

Law's research has examined the flux of gases between the land and the atmosphere. She is the lead investigator for the Oregon site of the Ameriflux project, one of the global network of sites within FLUXNET that use eddy covariance to measure carbon, water, and energy fluxes from terrestrial ecosystems. Law's research has revealed that allowing old-growth forests to live longer increases carbon storage by forests relative to planting of new forests. A 2020 investigation by ProPublica revealed that the Oregon Forest Resources Institute, a state-funded agency, was acting as a lobbying arm for the timber industry while discrediting this research despite the fact that the paper passed peer review. More recently, Law contributed to an article looking at the relationship between the wildfires caused by climate change and their impact on human health, particularly the exposure to wildfire particulate matter across the United States.

In 2006 a paper was published on the role of logging in the recovery of an area after the 2002 Biscuit Fire; a series of lightning-caused fires in the Siskiyou National Forest burning nearly half a million acres of forest. The paper was controversial (e.g., Biscuit Fire publication controversy) and resulted in a series of articles following up the initial publication. Subsequent research by Law and colleagues revealed carbon emissions from the fire was 16 times higher than the region's annual production in the years prior to the fire.

=== Selected publications ===
- Law, Beverly E.; Ryan, Michael G.; Anthoni, Peter M. (1999). "Seasonal and annual respiration of a ponderosa pine ecosystem". Global Change Biology. 5 (2): 169–182. Bibcode:1999GCBio...5..169L. doi:10.1046/j.1365-2486.1999.00214.x. ISSN 1365-2486. S2CID 39050007.
- Baldocchi, Dennis; Falge, Eva; Gu, Lianhong; Olson, Richard; Hollinger, David; Running, Steve; Anthoni, Peter; Bernhofer, Ch; Davis, Kenneth; Evans, Robert; Fuentes, Jose; Goldstein, Allen; Katul, Gabriel; Law, Beverly; Lee, Xuhui; Malhi, Yadvinder; Meyers, Tilden; Munger, William; Oechel, Walt; U, K. T. Paw; Pilegaard, Kim; Schmid, H. P.; Valentini, Riccardo; Verma, Shashi; Vesala, Timo; Wilson, Kell; Wofsy, Steve (1 November 2001). "FLUXNET: A New Tool to Study the Temporal and Spatial Variability of Ecosystem-Scale Carbon Dioxide, Water Vapor, and Energy Flux Densities". Bulletin of the American Meteorological Society. 82 (11): 2415–2434. Bibcode:2001BAMS...82.2415B. doi:10.1175/1520-0477(2001)082<2415:FANTTS>2.3.CO;2. ISSN 0003-0007. S2CID 29768827.
- Law, B.E; Falge, E; Gu, L; Baldocchi, D.D; Bakwin, P; Berbigier, P; Davis, K; Dolman, A.J; Falk, M; Fuentes, J.D; Goldstein, A; Granier, A; Grelle, A; Hollinger, D; Janssens, I.A; Jarvis, P; Jensen, N.O; Katul, G; Mahli, Y; Matteucci, G; Meyers, T; Monson, R; Munger, W; Oechel, W; Olson, R; Pilegaard, K; Paw U, K.T; Thorgeirsson, H; Valentini, R; Verma, S; Vesala, T; Wilson, K; Wofsy, S (December 2002). "Environmental controls over carbon dioxide and water vapor exchange of terrestrial vegetation". Agricultural and Forest Meteorology. 113 (1–4): 97–120. Bibcode:2002AgFM..113...97L. doi:10.1016/S0168-1923(02)00104-1. S2CID 28609146.
- Luyssaert, Sebastiaan; Schulze, E.-Detlef; Börner, Annett; Knohl, Alexander; Hessenmöller, Dominik; Law, Beverly E.; Ciais, Philippe; Grace, John (September 2008). "Old-growth forests as global carbon sinks". Nature. 455 (7210): 213–215. Bibcode:2008Natur.455..213L. doi:10.1038/nature07276. ISSN 1476-4687. PMID 18784722. S2CID 4424430.
- Law, Beverly E.; Hudiburg, Tara W.; Berner, Logan T.; Kent, Jeffrey J.; Buotte, Polly C.; Harmon, Mark E. (2018-04-03). "Land use strategies to mitigate climate change in carbon dense temperate forests". Proceedings of the National Academy of Sciences. 115 (14): 3663–3668. Bibcode:2018PNAS..115.3663L. doi:10.1073/pnas.1720064115. PMC 5889652. PMID 29555758.

== Awards and honors ==
- Fellow, American Geophysical Union (2014)
- Aldo Leopold Leadership Fellow (2004)
- Norbert Gerbier-MUMM International Award, World Meteorological Organization for Law et al. (2002) paper, awarded 2004
