= Pearsoll Peak =

Mountain in Oregon, United States

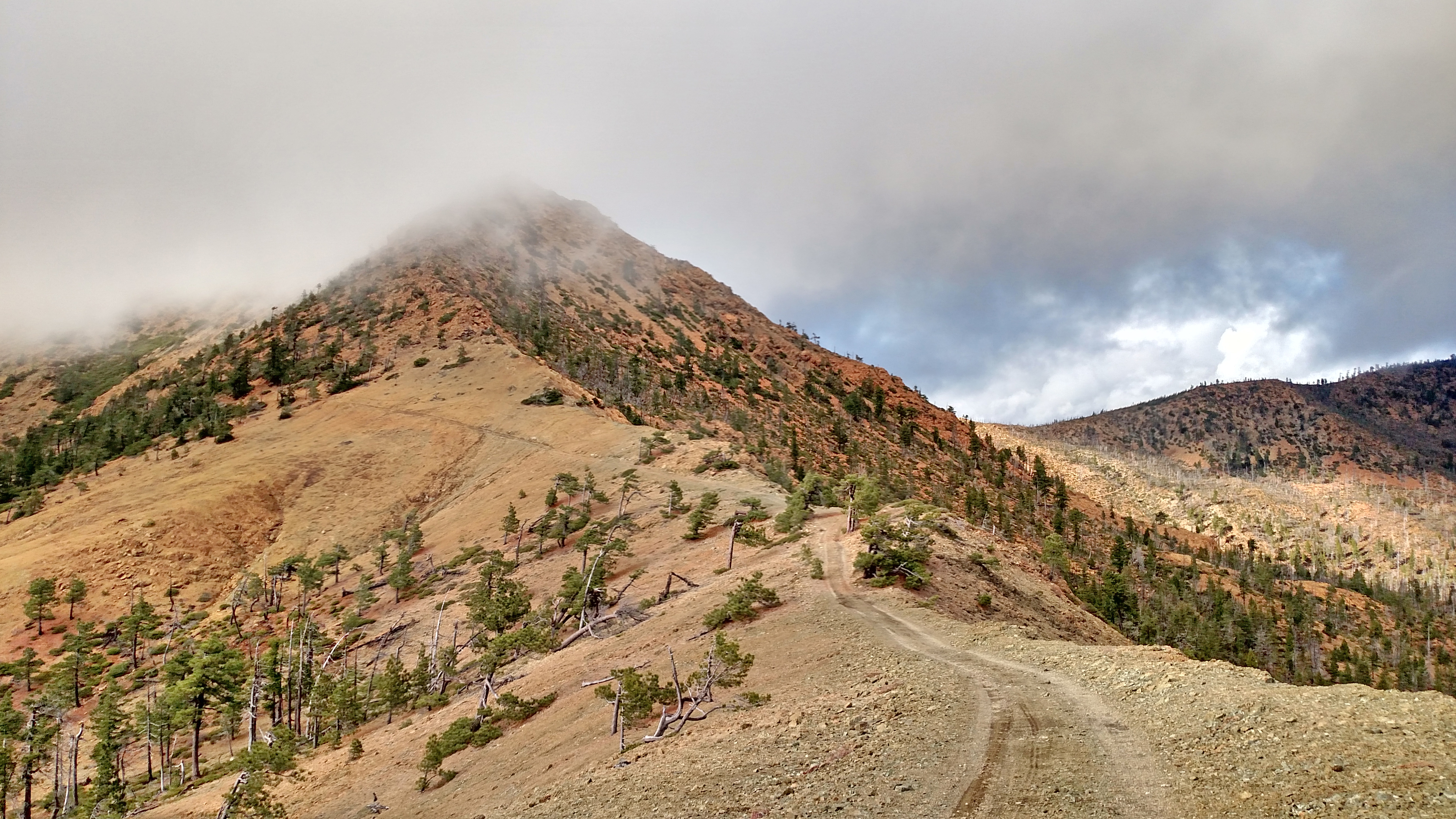

Highest point
- Elevation: 5,098 ft (1,554 m) NAVD 88
- Prominence: 2,600 ft (792 m)
- Coordinates: 42°17′55″N 123°50′47″W

Geography
- Location within Oregon Location within the United States
- Location: Curry / Josephine counties, Oregon, U.S.
- Parent range: Klamath Mountains
- Topo map: USGS Pearsoll Peak

Climbing
- Easiest route: high clearance vehicle or hike

Pearsoll Peak is a mountain in the Klamath Mountains of southwestern Oregon in the United States. It is located in the northern Kalmiopsis Wilderness in southeastern Curry County and western Josephine County in the extreme southwest corner of the state, approximately 20 miles (32 km) from the Pacific Ocean and 20 miles (32 km) north of the California state line. It is the highest point in the Kalmiopsis Wilderness and has a historic fire lookout on a false summit a short distance east of the Wilderness Boundary which overlooks the Illinois River Valley. The current lookout structure replaced the original cupola-style building in 1954 and was actively staffed as a fire lookout into the early 1970s. After that, the building fell into disrepair until the Sand Mountain Society, an all-volunteer nonprofit based in Portland, OR, stepped in to restore the L-4 Model lookout cabin in 1991. The group has done meticulous maintenance on the building, starting in 1991. The most recent major Sand Mountain Society effort is still in progress, having been interrupted by recent fire closures and other commitments.

Remarkably, the fire lookout was spared in three catastrophic fires so far this century: the Biscuit Fire of 2002; the Chetco Bar Fire of 2017 (with trees torching within 100 feet of the building), and; the Klondike Fire of 2018.
