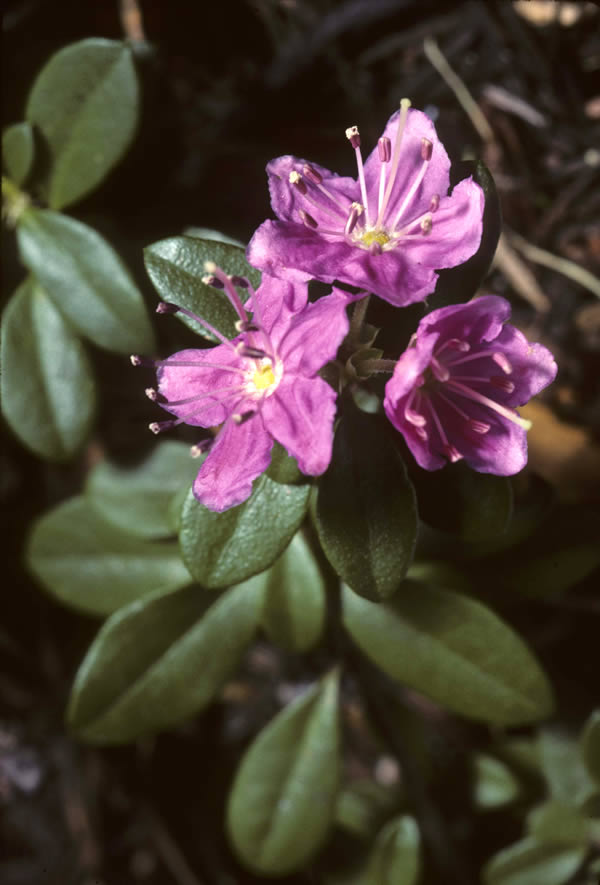

Conservation status
- Imperiled (NatureServe)

Scientific classification
- Kingdom: Plantae
- Clade: Tracheophytes
- Clade: Angiosperms
- Clade: Eudicots
- Clade: Asterids
- Order: Ericales
- Family: Ericaceae
- Genus: Kalmiopsis
- Species: K. fragrans

Binomial name
- Kalmiopsis fragrans Meinke & Kaye

= Kalmiopsis fragrans =

Species of flowering plant

Kalmiopsis fragrans is a rare species of flowering plant in the heath family known by the common name North Umpqua kalmiopsis. It is endemic to Oregon in the United States, where there are just a few known populations, all within Douglas County.

This plant has been known since the 1950s but it was generally treated as a form of Kalmiopsis leachiana. In 2007 it was separated and described as a new species. It differs slightly from K. leachiana in the size and shape of the flower.

== Description ==
Kalmiopsis fragrans is a shrub which grows 1 to 3 metres (3.3 to 9.8 feet) tall. The aromatic, glandular green leaves are oval or oblong in shape and variable in size, up to about 4.5 centimetres (1.8 inches) at the largest. The inflorescence bears 2 to 12 showy pink flowers each 1.6 to 3.2 centimetres (0.63 to 1.26 inches) in diameter. The protruding stamens are tipped with purple anthers and have tufts of yellow hairs around the bases. The plant is distylous, some individuals having long stamens and a short pistil, and some having short stamens and a long pistil.

== Distribution and habitat ==
The range of K. fragrans is limited to a small strip of territory along the North and South Umpqua River in the Cascade Range of southwestern Oregon. It grows in rocky habitat, such as scree slopes and piles of boulders, and can take hold in areas with very little soil. The rock type frequently associated with the shrub is tuff.

Other plants in the area include several types of conifers as well as Oregon-grape (Mahonia nervosa), ocean spray (Holodiscus discolor), salal (Gaultheria shallon), redwood sorrel (Oxalis oregana), western sword fern (Polystichum munitum), twinflower (Linnaea borealis), wood rose (Rosa gymnocarpa), pinedrops (Pterospora andromedea), fringed pinesap (Pleuricospora fimbriolata), sugar stick (Allotropa virgata), Pacific rhododendron (Rhododendron macrophyllum), vine maple (Acer circinatum), poison oak (Toxicodendron diversilobum), western rattlesnake plantain (Goodyera oblongifolia), false lupine (Thermopsis montana), yellowleaf iris (Iris chrysophylla), white-veined wintergreen (Pyrola picta), northern sanicle (Sanicula graveolens), calypso orchid (Calypso bulbosa), cream fawnlily (Erythronium citrinum), and field woodrush (Luzula campestris).

The total population of this plant is estimated to be no more than 2500 individuals. Threats to the rare plant include logging and road construction, but because the plant grows in steep, inaccessible habitat, often in protected areas, some populations may not be affected. Herbivory by animals such as deer may be a threat. The plant may not reproduce efficiently, as evidenced by the apparent lack of seedlings, but it probably spreads via vegetative reproduction.
