= Silver Fire (1987 Oregon wildfire) =

1987 Oregon wildfire

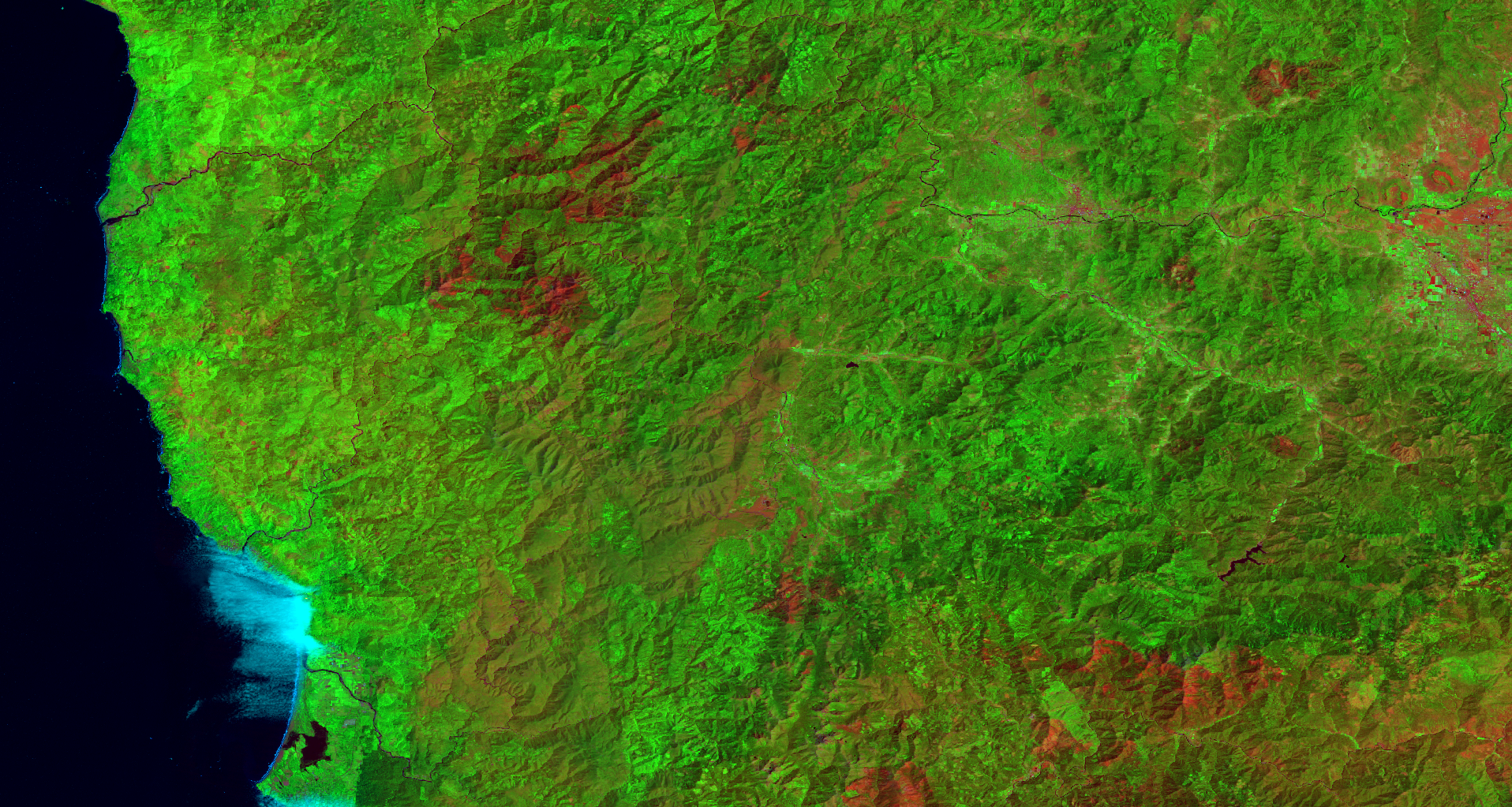
- Area burned by the Silver Fire, July 30, 1988, Landsat 5 TM, false color, infrared, bands 642, satellite image
- Date: August 30, 1987 – November 2, 1987
- Location: Siskiyou National Forest, Oregon, United States

Statistics
- Burned area: 96,240 acres (389 km^{2})

Ignition
- Cause: Lightning

The Silver Fire was a 1987 wildfire in the Siskiyou National Forest (now part of the Rogue River–Siskiyou National Forest) in Oregon. It burned 96,240 acres (389 km^{2}), of which 42,350 acres (171 km^{2}) was located in the Kalmiopsis Wilderness. Parts of its burned area were re-burned in the Biscuit Fire and the Chetco Bar Fire. It was started by a lightning strike near Silver Creek on August 30, and was contained on November 2 after a dry summer in the area, with relative humidity as low as 4% at times in certain places (very low for the area), was ended by heavy rain. Firefighters from across the country, as far away as Virginia, went to Oregon to fight the fire. Nearly 4,000 people were involved in the effort.

== Timeline ==
- August 30, 1987: A "severe dry lightning storm" in southern Oregon and northern California starts the Silver Fire, along with several other fires. Lightning and smoke are reported by fire lookouts.
- August 31: A bomb threat is made against a United States Forest Service office, delaying mobilization efforts. No bomb is found after a thorough investigation.
- September 1: Firefighting response begins in the early morning, but is assigned relatively low priority, as other fires started by the storm posed a more immediate threat to life and property. Initial response includes smokejumpers, surveillance aircraft, and fire retardant dumpers. The smokejumpers were quickly overwhelmed and had to be evacuated, leaving aircraft as the primary means of fighting the fire
- September 3: The Silver Fire combines with another fire sparked by the storm, the Lazy Fire, and rapidly expands by drawing air into the Silver Creek canyon. The combined fire reaches 18,000 acres (73 km^{2}).
- September 4: The fire is directly north of the Kalmiopsis Wilderness. It is less than one mile from the Illinois River. It is not possible to see much of the fire, because old-growth forests of Douglas fir trees are burning and blocking the view of other areas. A meeting is held to form task forces for evacuation, public information, intelligence and strategy, and logistics.
- September 5: The Forest Service uses aerial infrared photography to obtain a better view of the fire than was previously possible. The fire was determined to have burned 22,000 acres (89 km^{2}) acres. The fire is too hot for significant firefighting efforts, but major preparation work is being done. It is burning approximately 10 miles (16 km) from Agness, Oregon and 25 miles (40 km) from Grant's Pass. Town meetings were held in both of these places, informing the public of what the dangers were and how they were being handled.
- September 6: The Longwood and Galice fires, which had been given higher priority than the Silver Fire, are mostly contained, allowing the use of more resources to fight the Silver Fire. Approximately 1,200 acres (4.9 km^{2}) acres within the Kalmiopsis Wilderness are burning. No structures are threatened; the most significant hazard is heavy smoke in Gold Beach and Brookings.
- September 7–11: The fire continues to spread, despite heavy firefighting efforts. Steep, rocky terrain hinders ground-based efforts.
- September 8: Progress has been made. 9,000 firefighters are working on the Silver Fire, which has burned 22,000 acres (89 km^{2}), and the Galice Fire, which has burned 10,500 acres (42 km^{2}).
- September 10: Military firefighters who had been working on the Longwood Fire are reassigned to the Silver Fire. The fire is primarily a crown fire at this point.
- September 12: The fire has burned 28,100 acres (114 km^{2}), but still has not destroyed any structures or caused any fatalities. However, the fire continues to spread unpredictably due to changing wind, which made it very difficult for firefighters to work safely. Aerial water drops and firebreaks are used to help fight the fire; unlike in previous days, the fire does not burn past the lines made this day.
- September 13: The Galice Fire is contained.
- September 14: The fire reaches 30,000 acres (120 km^{2}); 1,800 firefighters are currently fighting it. Firebreaks have been made around about a quarter of the fire. Rain and cooler weather on this day aids firefighting efforts.
- September 16: The fire has been spreading less than usual for the last few days, so more progress is made on firelines. A "heavy duty Vertol helicopter" is made available for firefighting, and is soon a "major factor in the rising hopes towards full-containment." East winds cause the fire to spread faster than it has the last few days, but progress is still being made by firefighters. Permission to use fire retardant near and, if necessary, in the Kalmiopsis Wilderness is obtained from the Forest Service.
- September 19: The fire has burned 38,800 acres (157 km^{2}). It still has not caused any fatalities or serious injuries.
