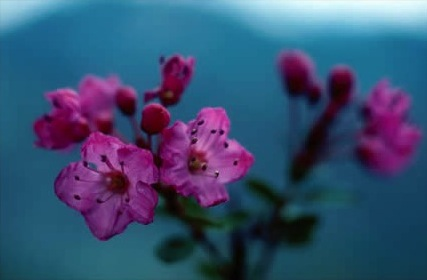
- Kalmiopsis leachiana

Scientific classification
- Kingdom: Plantae
- Clade: Embryophytes
- Clade: Tracheophytes
- Clade: Spermatophytes
- Clade: Angiosperms
- Clade: Eudicots
- Clade: Asterids
- Order: Ericales
- Family: Ericaceae
- Subfamily: Ericoideae
- Tribe: Phyllodoceae
- Genus: Kalmiopsis; Rehder

Species
- 2, see text

= Kalmiopsis =

Genus of flowering plants

Kalmiopsis is a small genus of flowering plants in the family Ericaceae.

== Species ==
It contains two species, which are endemic to Oregon in the United States. This was a monotypic genus containing only Kalmiopsis leachiana until 2007, when a form of it was elevated to species status, Kalmiopsis fragrans.

Image	Scientific name	Common name	Distribution
A photo of the flower in question. Small pink flowers with five petals each.	Kalmiopsis leachiana	Kalmiopsis	Siskiyou Mountains of southwest Oregon
	Kalmiopsis fragrans	North Umpqua kalmiopsis	Douglas County, Oregon.
