= Oregon Forest Resources Institute =

American forestry trade organization

- Established: 1991
- Type: State agency
- Purpose: Forest management education
- Headquarters: Portland, Oregon
- Funding: Forest products harvest tax
- Website: oregonforests.org

The Oregon Forest Resources Institute (OFRI) is a state agency that according to Oregon Public Broadcasting and The Oregonian operates as the timber industry's de facto lobbying organization in Oregon.

== History ==
OFRI was created by the Oregon Legislative Assembly in 1991 and is funded by a dedicated forest-products harvest tax. According the Oregon Public Broadcasting, it was created to "support the timber industry by educating the public about forests and wood products, and by helping private landowners manage their forests in ways that protect the environment". Its board of directors consists entirely of representatives from the timber industry.

According to OFRI, its forestry education programs reach more than 100,000 students and more than 1,000 educators annually.

OFRI manages the Rediscovery Forest together with the Oregon Garden, in Silverton. It is a forested area that "educates visitors on the practices and importance of Oregon's forestry industry".

OFRI has purchased several prominent advertising campaigns in the state of Oregon benefiting the timber industry. These campaigns are paid for with taxpayer dollars. In 2015 OFRI spent $1.05 million in taxpayer funds.

== Lobbying ==
A 2020 investigation by Oregon Public Broadcasting (OPB) and The Oregonian revealed that OFRI has acted as "public-relations agency and lobbying arm for Oregon's timber industry." The reporting showed that OFRI promotes the timber industry and suppresses dissemination of legitimate research conducted by reputable scientists including Beverly Law, a professor at Oregon State University.

On August 31, 2020, Gov. Kate Brown requested an audit of OFRI as a result of OPB's investigation. OFRI had not been audited since 1996. Secretary of State Bev Clarno was to conduct the audit. In June 2021, the state house voted to cut the majority of its funding HB 2357 B, reducing it to $1.7 million from a $4 million annual budget. That bill failed in the senate.

The audit was completed by July 2021, finding breaches of authority. OFRI agreed with all audit findings and OFRI's director, Erin Isselmann, agreed to change its practices. In 2022 OFRI announced that they were taking steps to address the issues raised by the audit. As of 2023 they had made several changes and continue to work with state officials while creating a Public Review Process to realign the organization with the will of Oregonians.

== See also ==
- List of Oregon state forests
