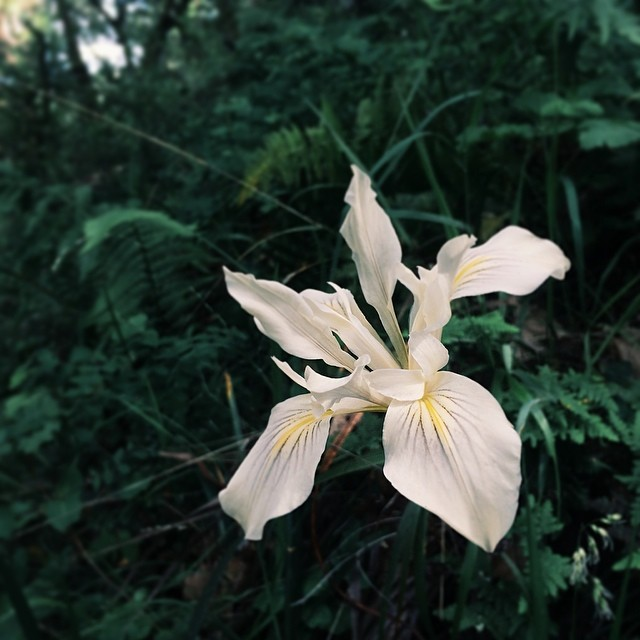
- Yellowleaf/Pacific Coast iris (Iris chrysophylla) from Phoenix Lake. Near Ross California

Conservation status
- Apparently Secure (NatureServe)

Scientific classification
- Kingdom: Plantae
- Clade: Embryophytes
- Clade: Tracheophytes
- Clade: Spermatophytes
- Clade: Angiosperms
- Clade: Monocots
- Order: Asparagales
- Family: Iridaceae
- Genus: Iris
- Subgenus: Iris subg. Limniris
- Section: Iris sect. Limniris
- Series: Iris ser. Californicae
- Species: I. chrysophylla

Binomial name
- Iris chrysophylla Howell

Synonyms
- Iris tenax subsp. chrysophylla (Howell) Q.D.Clarkson; Limniris chrysophylla (Howell) Rodion.

= Iris chrysophylla =

Yellowleaf iris

Species of flowering plant

Iris chrysophylla, the yellowleaf iris, is a wildflower which ranges from midwestern and southern Oregon west of the Cascades and south to the crest of the Siskiyou Mountains in northern California. The yellowleaf iris grows up to 5,500 feet (1,700 m) elevation, most commonly in open, coniferous forests.

== Description ==
This herbaceous perennial grows from compact, dark brown and slender rhizomes. The leaves are linear, finely ribbed, and light green, 25–50 cm long, and may be reddish colored at the base. The flowering stems are simple, solid, and slender, 3–20 cm. The flowers are cream to pale yellow, with dark golden to reddish-brown or lavender veins. The plant flowers from April through June.
