= Biscuit Fire publication controversy =

2006 academic and political controversy

The Biscuit Fire publication controversy was an academic and political controversy in the United States in January 2006 about publication of an academic paper titled "Post-wildfire logging hinders regeneration and increases fire risk". The U.S Forest Service and a group of professors, including six at the Oregon State University College of Forestry, wrote a letter to the prestigious scientific journal Science requesting that publication of a short forestry paper written by an OSU Forestry graduate student and others be delayed until the letter's authors could respond to the paper, arguing the article was "short on qualifiers and context". The group requested alternatively that Science publish a sidebar illustrating their concerns alongside the paper. Science refused, and the paper, which had already undergone peer review and been approved for publication, appeared in the January 20, 2006 issue. The paper had been published in the online edition of Science before the letter was written.

== Science article ==
The paper, written by graduate student Dan Donato and several colleagues, concerned the effects of logging in the aftermath of the 2002 Biscuit Fire, a massive wildfire which burned nearly a half million acres (2,000 km^{2}) in southwestern Oregon. Some forestry scientists, and the Bush administration, proposed that salvage logging—removal of dead trees, many still usable as timber, after a fire—was necessary for fire safety and forest regeneration. Donato et al.'s research provided some evidence contradicting this view. They compared sections of the burn which were burned severely and then salvage-logged to sections which had only been burned. They found the unlogged portions had significantly more conifer seedlings than were found in the logged portions. The paper suggested that soil disturbance and materials left over from the logging process may have disturbed the growth of seedlings. The paper also reported elevated surface fuels in the logged sites, which they concluded elevated the risk of future fire.

== Political involvement ==
The incident and its aftermath had significant repercussions in the forestry community, and highlighted the political obstacles surrounding much of forestry science and research. When the letter first came to light the College of Forestry was subjected to heavy criticism from both within and outside for what many perceived as an unwarranted attack on academic freedom. Accusations of politically motivated bias were made by both sides, and critics of the incident noted that the College received 10% of its funding from a tax on logging, and that many professors had ties with the Forest Service and the logging industry. Defenders of the college noted that the vast majority of research in the college was funded by competitive grants, and that collaboration with government agencies and relevant industries is common across the sciences. Hal Salwasser, the dean of the College of Forestry, eventually survived a vote of confidence, apologized for his part in the controversy (but not for calling environmentalists "goons"), and reaffirmed OSU's support for academic freedom.

The letter's primary author, OSU forestry engineering professor John Sessions, claimed that the paper's publication constituted a failure of the peer review process, and that he would appeal the matter to the board of Science. Science editor-in-chief Donald Kennedy said in a letter to The Oregonian that it "would be foolish to argue that no consideration of the political extensions of this finding could have entered the decision" regarding publication; however, he believes that the paper would have "made it (to publication) on its own".

== Ongoing research and discussion ==
The August 4, 2006 issue of Science contained comments by the OSU professors, congressman Brian Baird, and a response from Donato and his colleagues. Evergreen Magazine, a publication that describes itself as "the voice of American forestry and science-based forest policy" subsequently dedicated an entire issue to a discussion of the controversy.

In the following year two new papers partially substantiated Donato's findings. Natural conifer regeneration following severe fires in the Siskiyou Klamath region was common, and stocking standards were always exceeded without planting, although natural regenerated conifers grew slower than planted conifers. Thompson and others found that the Biscuit Fire severity was higher in areas that had been burned and salvaged fifteen years earlier (1987) than it was in comparable areas that were burned in 1987 but left unmanaged.
