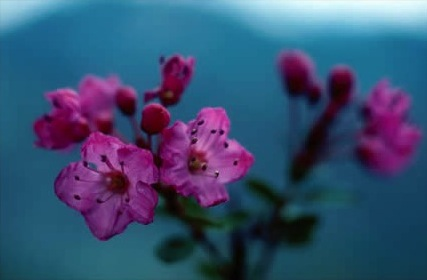

Conservation status
- Vulnerable (NatureServe)

Scientific classification
- Kingdom: Plantae
- Clade: Tracheophytes
- Clade: Angiosperms
- Clade: Eudicots
- Clade: Asterids
- Order: Ericales
- Family: Ericaceae
- Genus: Kalmiopsis
- Species: K. leachiana

Binomial name
- Kalmiopsis leachiana (Henderson) Rehd.

= Kalmiopsis leachiana =

Species of plant

Kalmiopsis leachiana, commonly referred to as Siskiyou kalmiopsis, is a rare flowering plant endemic to the Siskiyou Mountains of southwest Oregon, where it is specially protected in the 179,755-acre (727.4 km^{2}) Kalmiopsis Wilderness reserve. It was discovered in 1930 by Lilla Leach in the Gold Basin area.

It is related to Kalmia in the family Ericaceae.

== Description ==
Kalmiopsis leachiana is an evergreen shrub growing to 10–30 centimetres (0.33–0.98 ft) tall, with erect stems bearing spirally arranged simple leaves 2–3 cm long and 1 cm broad.

The flowers are pink-purple, in racemes of 6–9 together, reminiscent of small Rhododendron flowers but flatter, with a star-like calyx and five conjoined petals; each flower is 1.5–2 cm diameter. The fruit is a five-lobed capsule, which splits to release the numerous small seeds.
