= Katherine Ewel =

American ecologist

Katherine Carter Ewel (born September 30, 1944) is a Professor Emeritus at the University of Florida's School of Forest Resources and Conservation. She is an ecosystem, forest, and wetlands ecologist who has worked in Florida for much of her career, focusing much of it on cypress swamps, pine plantations, and mangrove forests in the Pacific. Ewel served as the vice-president of the Society of Wetland Scientists in 2003, becoming president in 2004 and now since 2005, a past president. She has now retired and lives near Gainesville, Florida.

== Early life ==
Ewel was born on September 30, 1944, in Glens Falls, a small town in the foothills of the Adirondacks in New York State. The outdoors always drew her, often visiting a cabin on Lake George, hiking and exploring with family members. At first, Ewel sought to be a journalist, but after taking a biology course in her high school, her new goal was set, and was guided towards ecology by her classwork at Cornell.

== Career ==
Ewel graduated from Cornell University in 1966 with a degree in zoology, and completed her PhD in zoology at the University of Florida in 1970. She became a professor at University of Florida's School of Forest Resources and Conservation, working there for over 20 years, making research contributions in wetland, upland forest, and lake ecology and management, until she was hired by the USDA Forest Service's Institute of Pacific Islands in Honolulu, Hawaii in 1994. While in charge of the institute's Wetlands Team, she led research projects on mangrove forests and other wetlands in the Pacific Micronesia. As a result of the extent of her work, she became a Fellow of the Society of Wetlands Scientists, serving as its vice-president in 2003, before becoming president in 2004.

She retired from the Forest Service in 2005 and moved back to the Gainesville, Florida area, but never left her work in the Pacific behind, continuing to write academic articles on her work and data collected in the Pacific, and becoming a Society of Wetland Scientists' past president in 2005.

== Major research contributions ==
Ewel has worked on a range of ecosystems, but a large part of her career was focused on cypress swamps and mangrove forests in the pacific. She was a big proponent of the application of computer models/simulations in ecology to predict what may affect the studied ecosystems in the future.

=== Cypress swamps ===
Wetlands were the focus of most of Ewel's career, but much of her early work revolved around cypress swamps, culminating in the release of her book Cypress Swamps in 2001. Her work on cypress swamps began in 1972, she evaluated the possibility of cypress swamps being used as treatment wetlands for municipal sewage, combining and analyzing the results of her work with studies done throughout wetlands swamps in the southeastern U.S.

Her book, Cypress Swamps, describes the characteristics of cypress swamps as a whole, but incorporated her research and others' to examine their usefulness in human society and their broader ecological context. Her research presented in this book was novel in the way it used computer simulations in coordination with field and lab data to predict what may affect wetlands such as these in the future.

=== Pine plantations ===
Another focus of her career while at the University of Florida were pine plantations, a major land use in Florida with approximately 32% of forested lands in the state being pine plantations. Ewel used computer models throughout her research and it has been a focus of her career, eventually teaching a class on it at the University of Florida, and this hold true for her research on pine plantations. Ewel constructed a model to predict leaf area of slash pine stands through climate conditions in the previous spring and the stand's basal area, which is useful for determining the light penetration in pine plantations that might be seen depending on various climatic conditions that a plantation could encounter in the future. Furthermore, she modeled CO_{2} evolution in the soils of pine plantations, discovering that by far, live root respiration was the most significant factor in soil CO_{2} evolution of these plantations. Ewel contributed to the making of the book, Agroforestry: Realities, Possibilities, and Potentials, published in 1987. She continues to use the things she learned in her research today, as in retirement she owns a pine plantation in northern Alachua County, Florida.

=== Mangroves and other tropical wetland forests ===
When she joined the USDA Forest Service's Institute of Pacific Islands Forestry, she led the Wetlands team's research on mangrove forests and forested peatlands in the Pacific. While working in the Pacific, Ewel researched and described the structure of mangrove forests and trees in Micronesia, publishing an academic paper on it in 1999. Furthermore, she studied the effect the formation of gaps in the forest canopy in pacific islands's mangrove forests would have on the ecosystem, finding that large gaps may have large impacts in dryer mangrove forests. One of her most cited papers, "Different kinds of mangrove forests provide different goods and services", discusses three types of mangrove forests; fringe forest, riverine forest, and basin forest, each with their own unique ecological service. Ewel wrote that fringe forests provide storm protection for ecosystems and land along coasts, while riverine forests are most valuable for plants and animals as it has the highest productivity, and basin forests are an important nutrient sink. Ewel also wrote about the importance of monitoring the effects of anthropogenic processes and climate change on the invertebrate, plant, and fungi that are so important in the maintenance of marine critical zones such as estuaries and coastal wetlands as their diversity is important for keeping the ecosystems functioning and supporting a much larger range of biota.

Ewel continues to write academic papers on Pacific wetlands after retiring in 2005, and her most cited academic contribution "A World Without Mangroves" was published in 2007, and highlights the danger of losing the mangrove ecosystem in the future as, when the journal article was written, 1-2% of mangroves were being lost every year.

== Notable publications ==
- Duke, N.C.; Meynecke, J.-O.; Dittmann, S.; Ellison, A M.; Anger, K.; Berger, U.; Cannicci, S.; Diele, K.; Ewel, K. C. (2007-07-06). "A World Without Mangroves?". Science. 317 (5834): 41–42.
- Ewel, Katherine C.; Odum, Howard T., eds. (2001-01-01). Cypress Swamps. Gainesville, FL: University Press of Florida.
- Ewel, Katherine; Twilley, Robert; Ong, Jin (1998-01-01). "Different kinds of mangrove forests provide different goods and services". Global Ecology and Biogeography Letters. 7 (1).
- Levin, Lisa A.; Boesch, Donald F.; Covich, Alan; Dahm, Cliff; Erseus, Christer; Ewel, Katherine C.; Kneib, Ronald T.; Moldenke, Andy; Palmer, Margaret A. (2001-08-01). "The Function of Marine Critical Transition Zones and the Importance of Sediment Biodiversity". Ecosystems. 4 (5) 430–451.
- Ewel, Katherine C.; Cropper Jr., Wendell P.; Gholz, Henry L. (1987-04). "Soil CO_{2} evolution in Florida slash pine plantations. I. Changes through time". Canadian Journal of Forest Research. 17 (4): 325-329
- Ewel, Katherine C.; Cropper Jr., Wendell P.; Gholz, Henry L. (1987-04). "Soil CO_{2} evolution in Florida slash pine plantations. II. Importance of root respiration". Canadian Journal of Forest Research. 17 (4): 330-333
- Williams, Kimberlyn; Ewel, Katherine C.; Stumpf, Richard P.; Putz, Francis E.; Workman, Thomas W. (1999-09) "Sea-level Rise and Coastal Fores Retreat on the West Coast of Florida, USA". Ecology. 80 (6): 2045-2063
- Benstead, Jonathan P.; March, James G.; Fry, Brian; Ewel, Katherine C.; Pringle, Catherine M. (2006-02). " Testing Isosource: Stable Isotope Analysis of a Tropical Fishery with Diverse Organic Matter Sources". Ecology. 87(2): 326-333
- Chimner, Rodney A.; Ewel, Katherine C. (2005–12). "A Tropical Freshwater Wetland: II. Production, Decomposition, and Peat Formation". Wetlands Ecology and Management. 13 (6): 671-684
- Daily, Gretchen Cara (1997-02). "Nature's Services: Society's Dependence on Natural Ecosystems, Chapter 18; Water Quality Improvement by Wetlands by Dr. Katherine Ewel" Island Press.
- Ewel, Katherine C. (2001–12). "Natural Resource Management: The Need for Interdisciplinary Collaboration". Ecosystems. 4 (8): 716–722.
- Krauss, Ken W.; Cahoon, Donald R.; Allen, James A.; Ewel, Katherine C.; Lynch, James C.; Cormier, Nicole (2010-01). "Surface Elevation Change and the Susceptibility of Different Mangrove Zones to Sea Level Rise on Pacific High Islands of Micronesia". Ecosystems. 13 (1): 129–143.
