= Chetco Bar Fire =

2017 wildfire in the U.S. state of Oregon

- Part of the 2017 Oregon wildfires
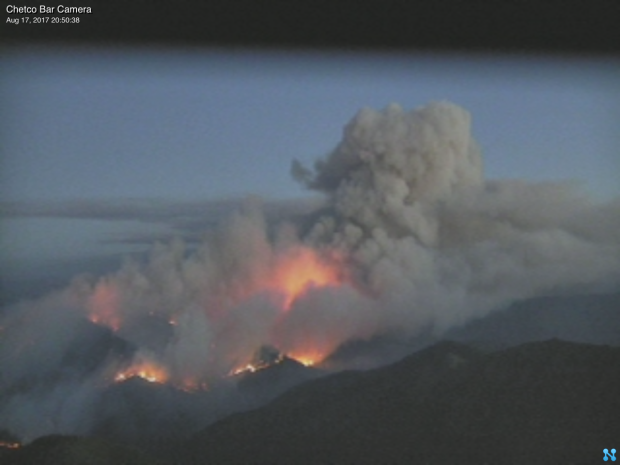
- Date: July 12, 2017 – November 2, 2017
- Location: Kalmiopsis Wilderness, Oregon, United States
- Coordinates: 42.297°N 123.954°W

Statistics
- Burned area: 191,125 acres (773 km^{2})

Ignition
- Cause: Lightning

Map
- Location of fire in Oregon.

The Chetco Bar Fire was a wildfire in the Kalmiopsis Wilderness, Oregon, United States. The fire, which was caused by a lightning strike and first reported on July 12, 2017. It burned 191,125 acres (773 km^{2}) as of November 4, when it was declared 100% contained. The Chetco Bar Fire area is subject to warm, dry winds known as the Brookings effect (also known as Chetco Effect), driven by high pressure over the Great Basin. The fire re-burned portions of the 2002 Biscuit Fire and the 1987 Silver Fire. The fire directly impacted communities surrounding it, causing mandatory evacuations.

== Events ==
The Chetco Bar Fire was started by a lightning strike in the Kalmiopsis Wilderness near the Chetco River. It was reported on July 12, 2017 at 1:45 PM. By July 15, it was primarily burning in the scar of the 2002 Biscuit Fire and had only burned 45 acres (0 km^{2}). At this time, fire crews expressed concerns about accessing the fire due to difficult and dangerous terrain.

By July 20, it was determined that the fire had actually burned over 300 acres (1 km^{2}). Up until this day, the crews were not using technology to gather acreage data, but estimates. As a precautionary response, the Rogue River – Siskiyou National Forest closed select forest service roads and trails.

As of August 2, the fire had expanded to 2,907 acres (12 km^{2}). Fears of an upcoming heatwave led to the creation of public use restrictions on fires in the area. By August 9, three additional trails were closed and on August 12, additional use restrictions were put in place regarding campfires and smoking.

On August 19, the fire, in Brookings effect wind, had spread 22,042 acres (89 km^{2}) and the first mandatory evacuations were put in place - for the top of Gardner Ridge Road and Cate Road past Hazel Camp area, Wilson Creek area, and along the Chetco River 3 miles up the North Bank Chetco River Road from Social Security Bar to the Wilderness Retreat area. Another mandatory evacuation was put in place, on August 21, for areas between Highway 101 and Carpenterville Road, north to the Pistol River.

Six days later, on August 24, the fire had burned 102,333 acres (414 km^{2}), burning in steep and rugged terrain about five miles north of Brookings, Oregon. The smoke from the fire began impacting visibility along Highway 101 and creating dramatic hazes in Gold Beach and in Brookings. By August 30, the National Guard had joined the fire fighting efforts.

Entering September, the fire continued to burn with mandatory evacuations being put in place all residents on Illinois River Road within US Forest Service Boundaries, including the Oak Flat community.

As of September 10, the fire was at 182,284 acres (738 km^{2}) and was 5% contained. The fire had spread into Curry County. In Josephine County, crews began structure assessments of the communities of O'Brien, Cave Junction, and Selma. Governor Kate Brown, US Forest Service Chief Tony Tooke, Senator Ron Wyden, Major General Michael Stencel, and House Representative Peter DeFazio visited the fire camp.

The fire was announced as being 100% contained on November 2.

== Impact ==
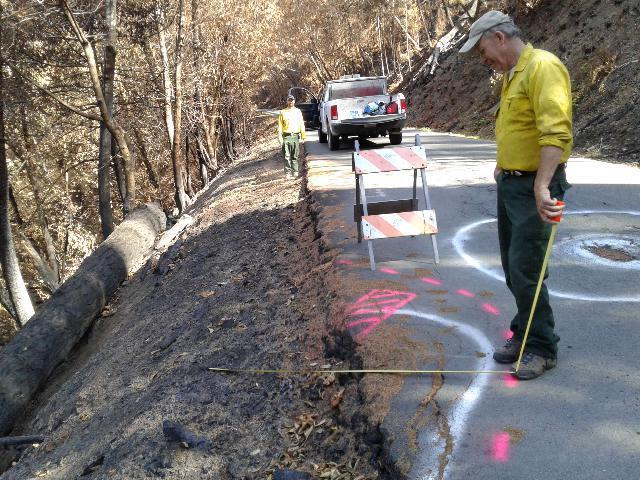
Member of the Burned Area Emergency Response team inspecting a forest road damaged by the fire.

The Checto Bar Post-Fire Burned Area Emergency Response (BAER) team completed their evaluation of the fire's impact on October 11, 2017. The Chetco Bar Fire damaged over 191,000 acres (773 km^{2}) of land, the majority of which was US Forest Service land and private land. The fires burned 190 acres (1 km^{2}) of redwood tree stands, with 6 acres (0 km^{2}) being 75 to 100 percent completely destroyed.

BAER reported that the probability of damage and loss of soil resources is "very high and high," due to the high soil burn severity in 1,621 acres (7 km^{2}) and substantial loss of stored carbon, which serves as the long term nutrient supply for vegetation and microfauna. Geological hazards are also of concern, including rock falls, landslides, debris flows, slope failures, and soil erosion. Hillslopes have lost much of their overstory, ground cover, and roughness causing a decline in water storage, which increases the likelihood of flooding. Coho salmon habitats have seen increases in debris.

Regarding human risk, BAER reported concerns with roads and rivers, streams and creeks. 136 miles of roads received fire treatment, including debris removal and repairing water culverts. 18.5 miles of trails received fire treatment, primarily to assist with water drainage. Recreational sites saw signage placement for warning the public about safety concerns, tree removal, hazardous waste clean up and some properties have been closed. The highest concern recreation areas are SF Chetco, Mineral Hill Fork Creeks, Eagle Creek and Panther Creek.

Cultural values were found to be at risk after the fire, with heritage sites experiencing low to high intensity effects to the surrounding vegetation. Sites impacted include the Wheeler Ridge Japanese Bombing Site, the Quail Prairie Mountain Lookout and a prehistoric Native American site.

The Chetco Bar Fire's impacts on wildlife has been reported as "high" in the Eagle Creek area of the Chetco River. Forest wide, 26 nest patches of northern spotted owls were impacted with 85 percent sustaining moderate to high burn intensities. 37 percent of suitable marbled murrelet nesting habitat was burned at moderate to high severity.

BAER reported concerns with municipal water supplies in Brookings and Harbor, primarily with intakes experiencing channel scour during high peak flow events. Port of Brookings Harbor experienced increased debris and sediment during winter 2017.

It also impacted local viewing of the solar eclipse of August 21, 2017.

== Gallery ==
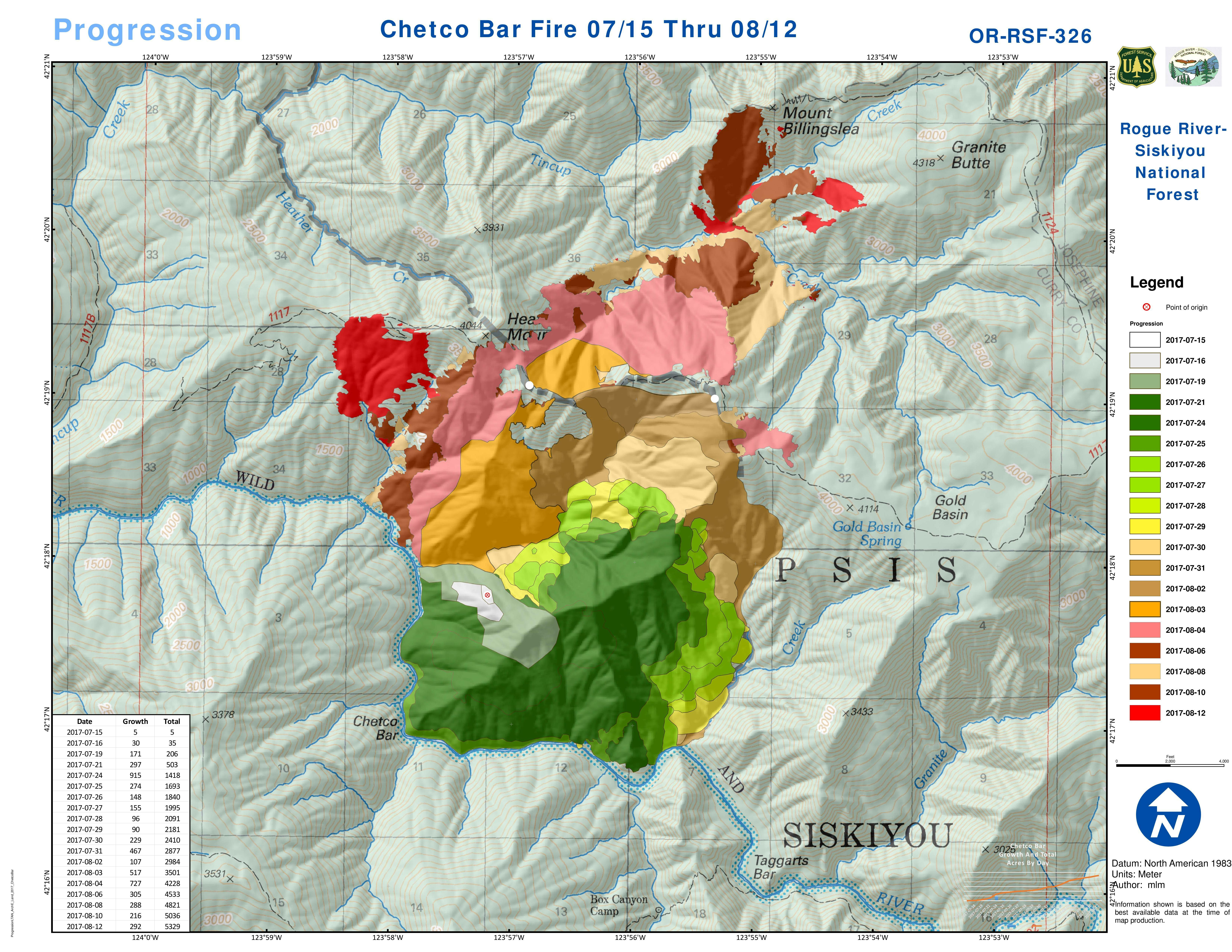
Chetco Bar Fire, Progression, July 15 to August 12, 2017

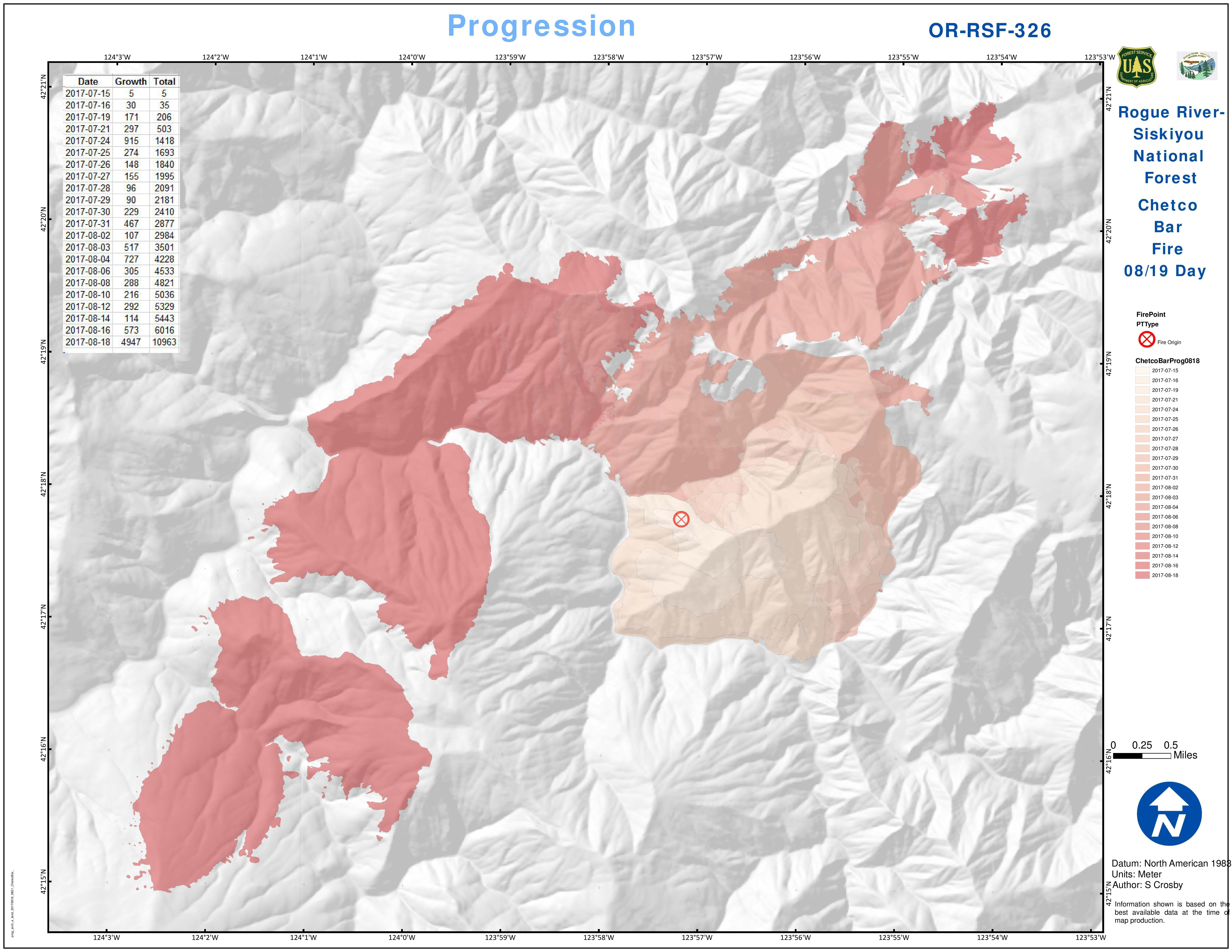
Chetco Bar Fire Progression, July 15 to August 18, 2017

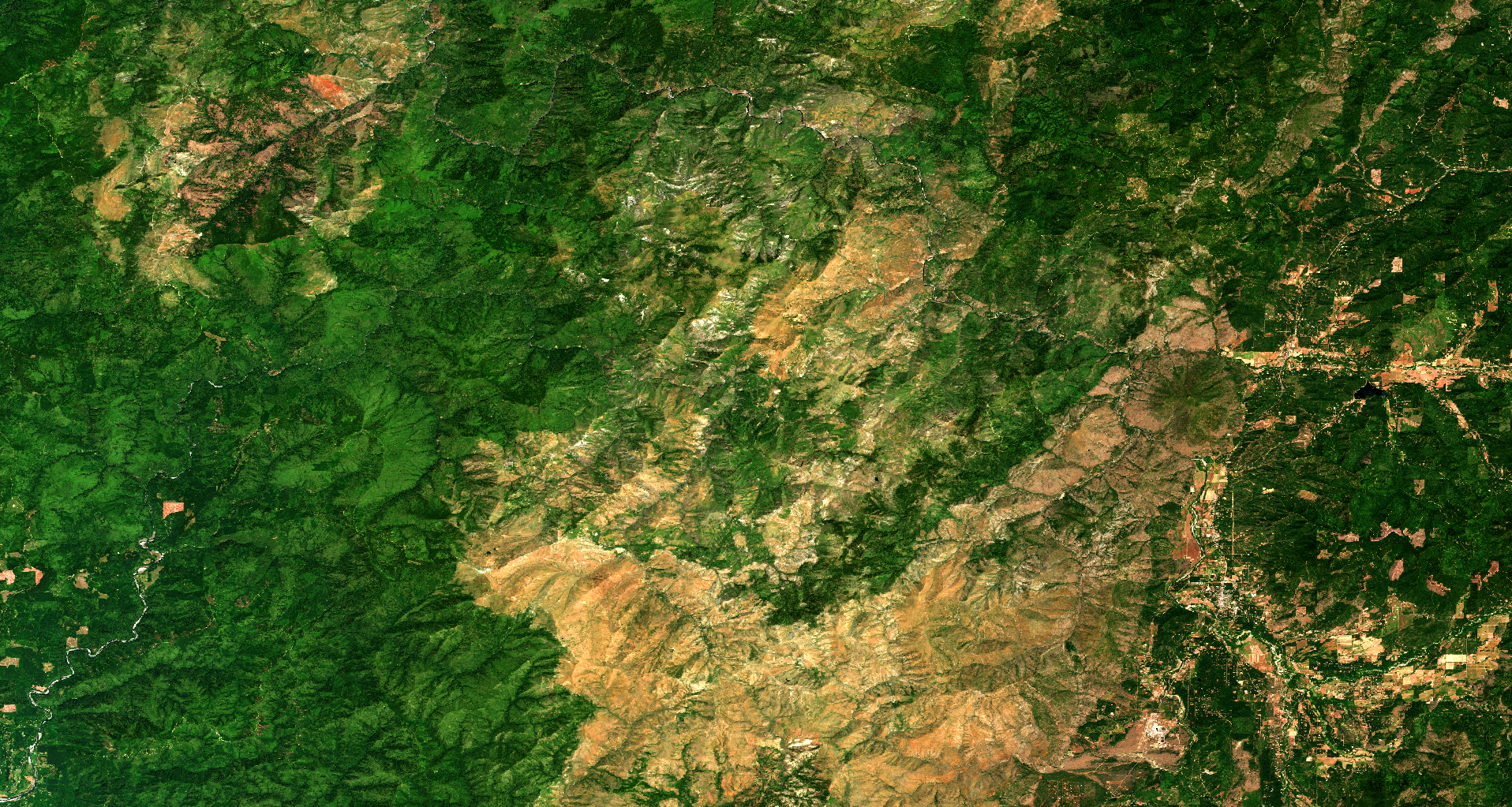
Before Chetco Bar Fire, 2 July 2017, Sentinel-2 true-color satellite image, scale 1:81,000

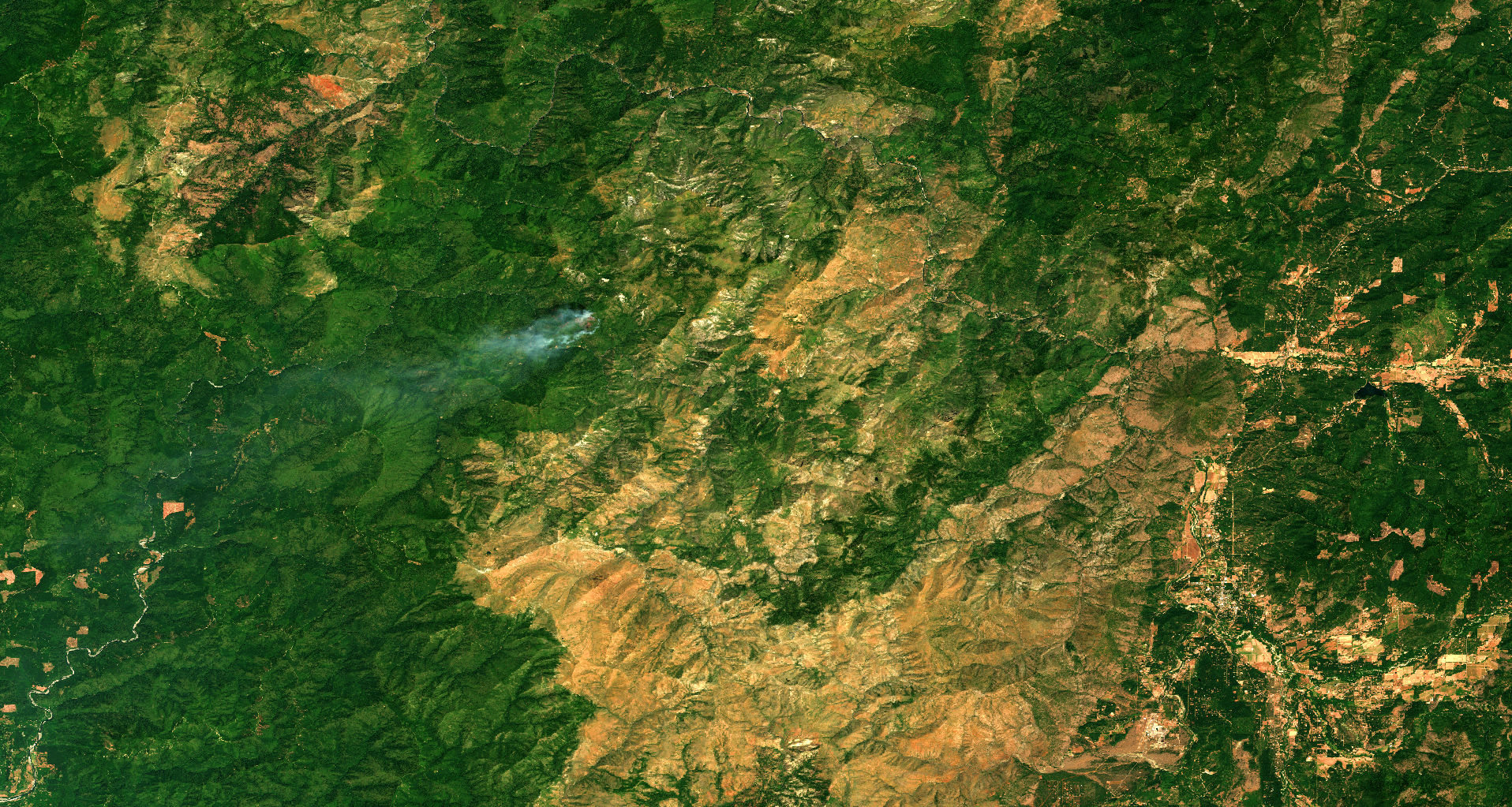
Chetco Bar Fire, 22 July 2017, Sentinel-2 true-color satellite image, scale 1:81,000

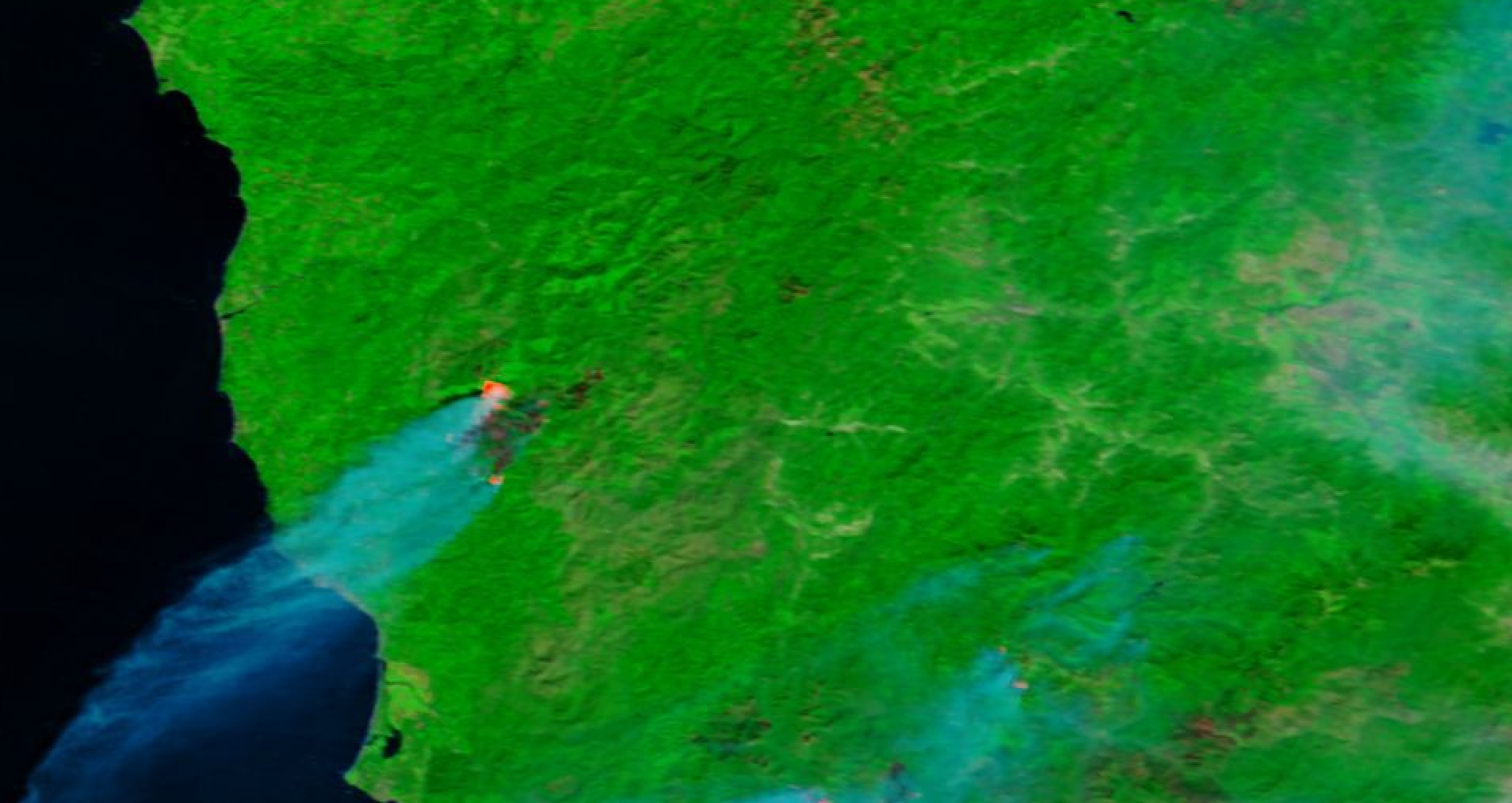
Chetco Bar Fire in Brookings effect wind on August 19, 2017, MODIS Terra 721 false color, infrared satellite image.

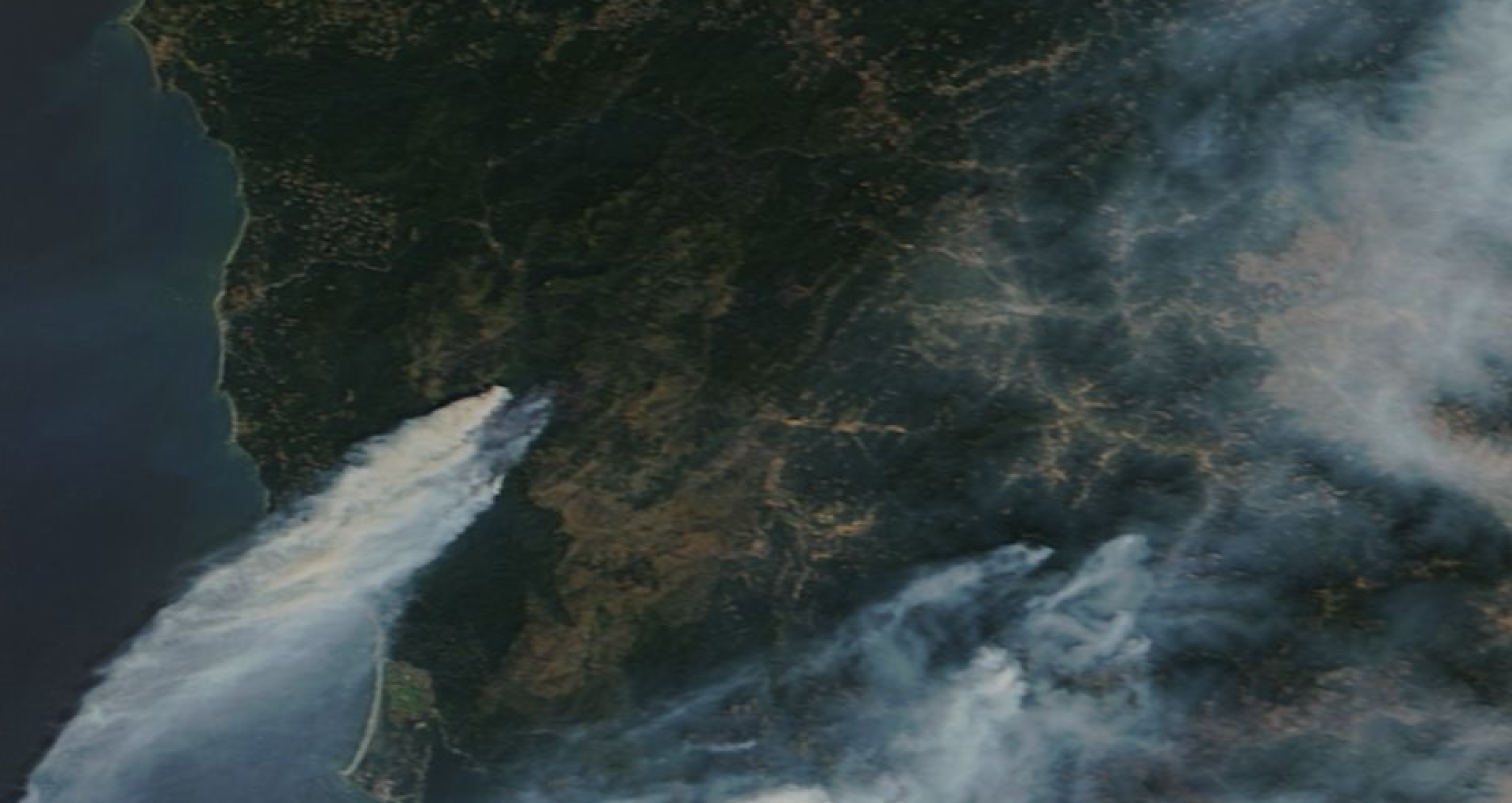
Chetco Bar Fire in Brookings effect wind on August 19, 2017, MODIS Terra visible satellite image.

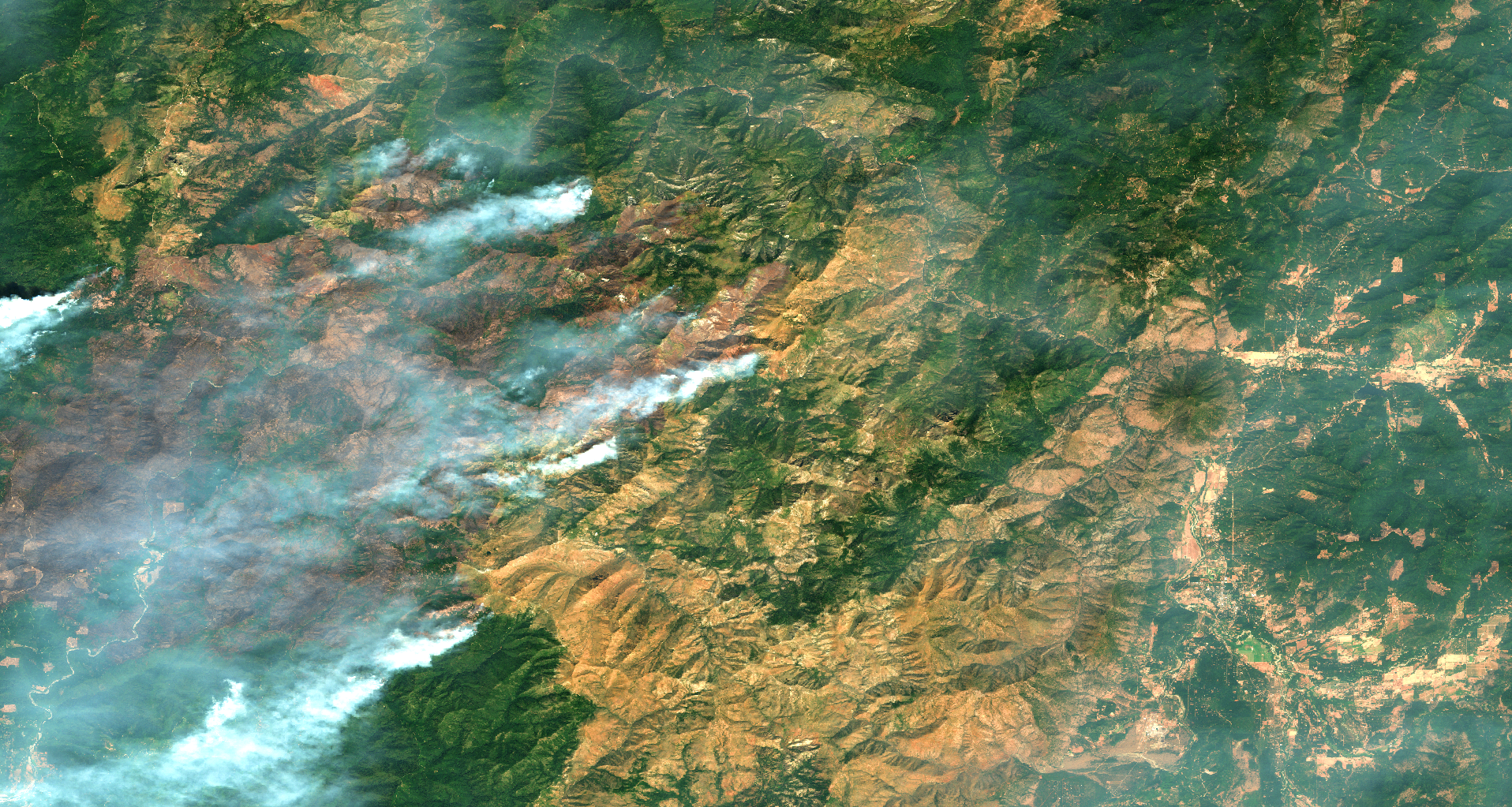
Chetco Bar Fire, 31 August 2017, Sentinel-2 true-color satellite image, scale 1:81,000

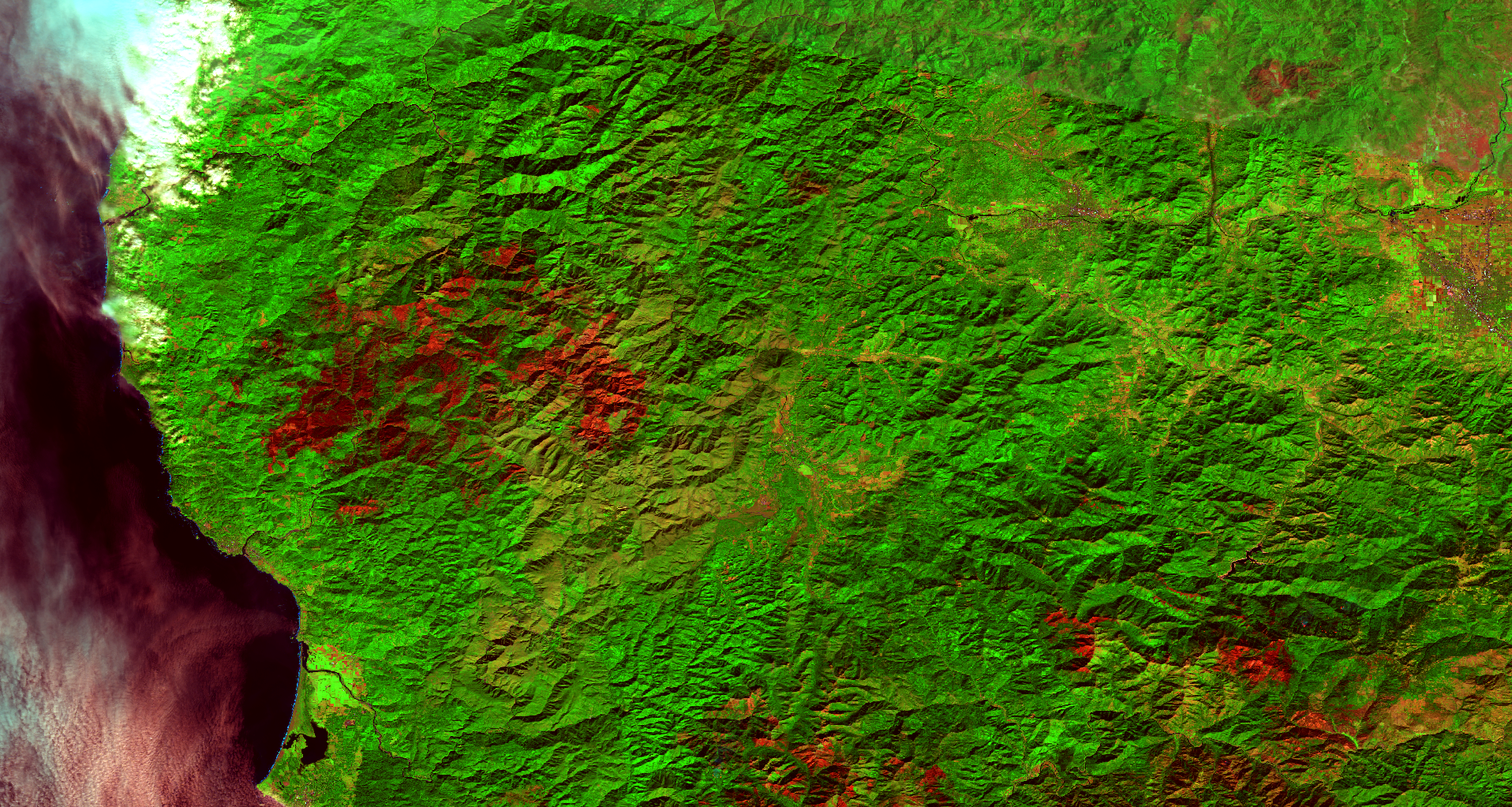
Chetco Bar Fire, 18 October 2017, Landsat 8 OLI, false color, infrared, bands 758 satellite image.

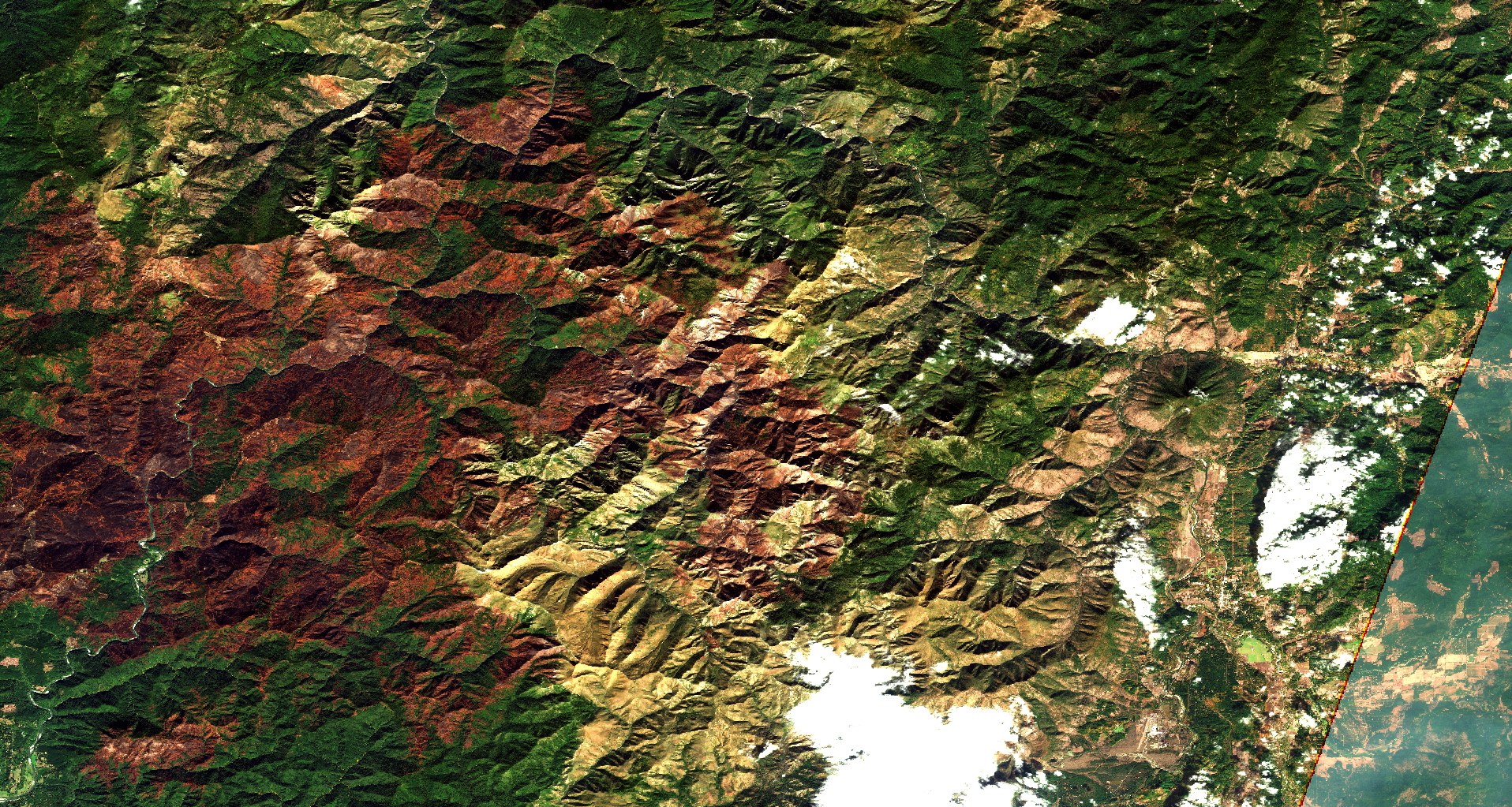
Chetco Bar Fire, 23 October 2017, Sentinel-2 true-color satellite image, scale 1:81,000

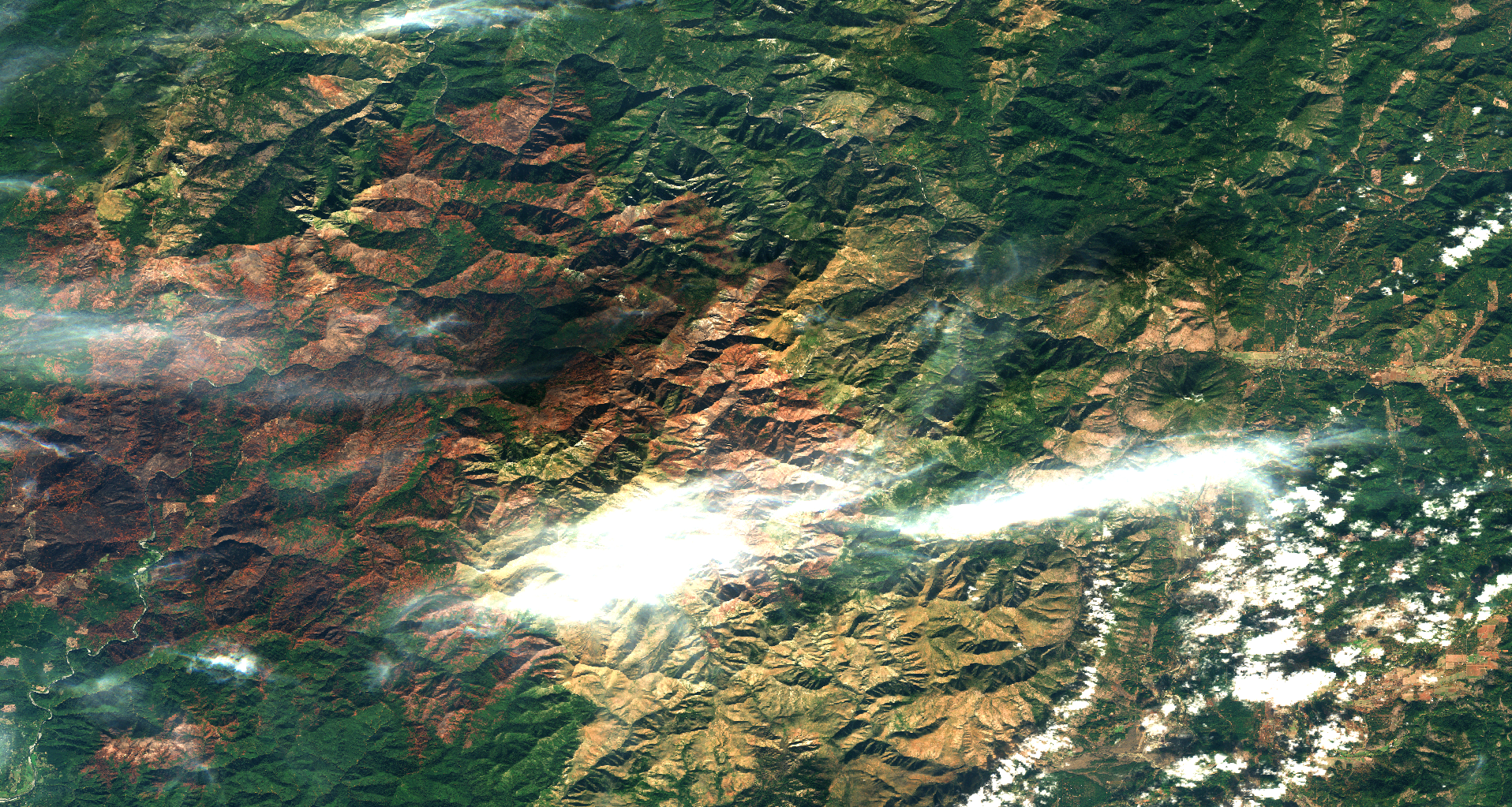
After Chetco Bar Fire, 30 October 2017, Sentinel-2 true-color satellite image, scale 1:81,000

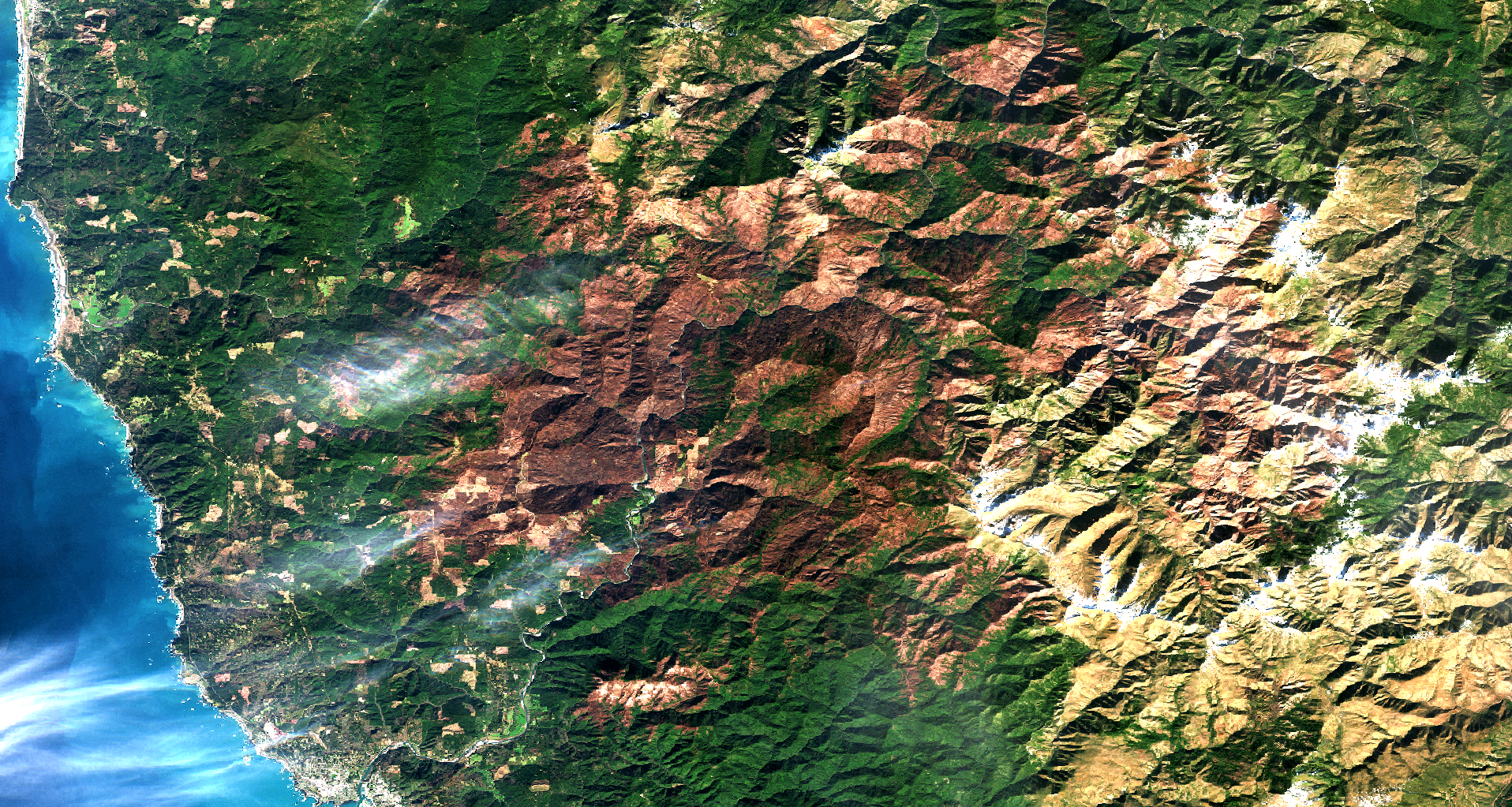
Chetco Bar Fire, 7 February 2018, Sentinel-2 true-color satellite image, scale 1:31,000

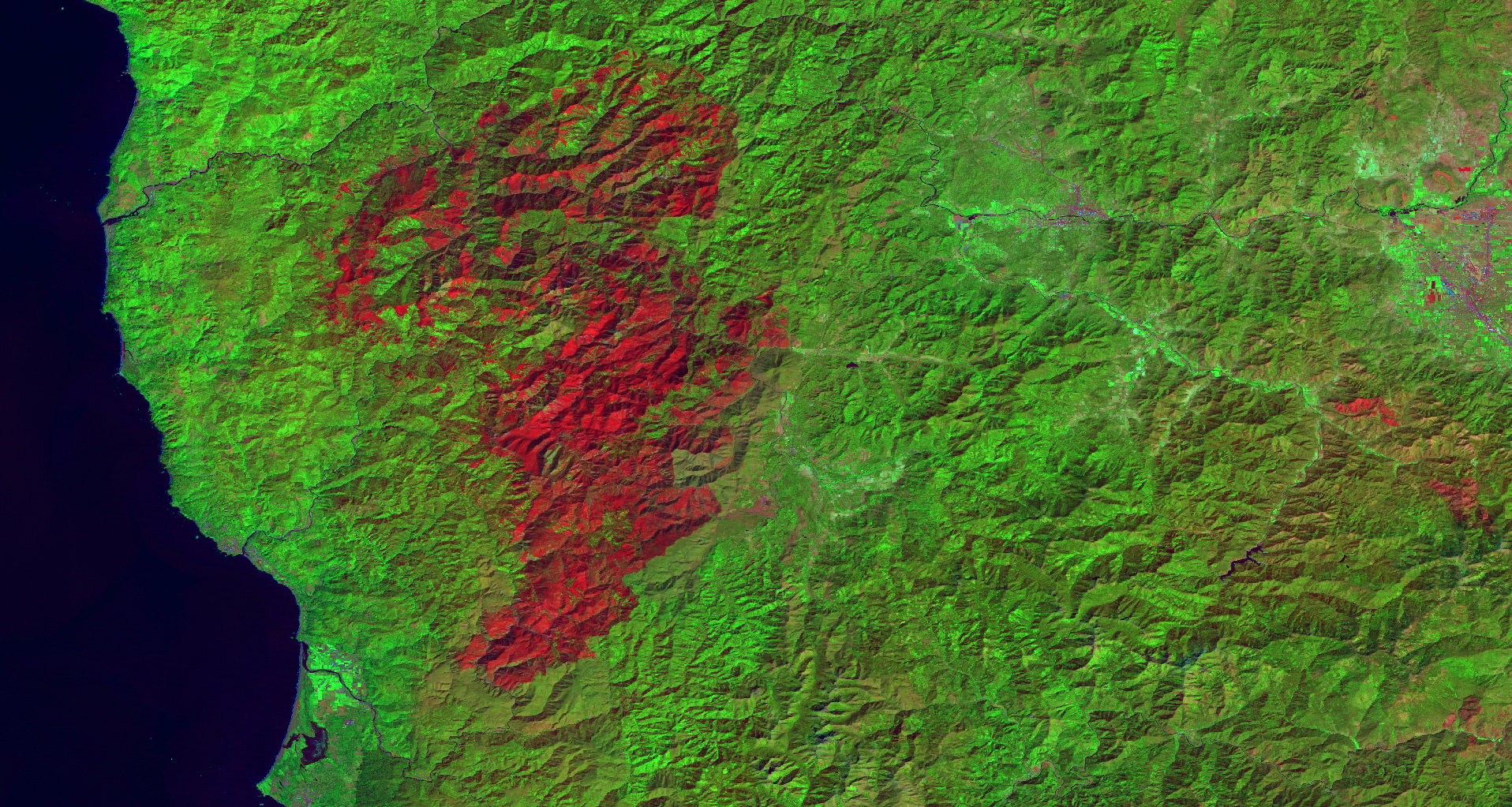
Biscuit Fire, 23 September 2002, Landsat 5 TM, false color, infrared, bands 642, satellite image.

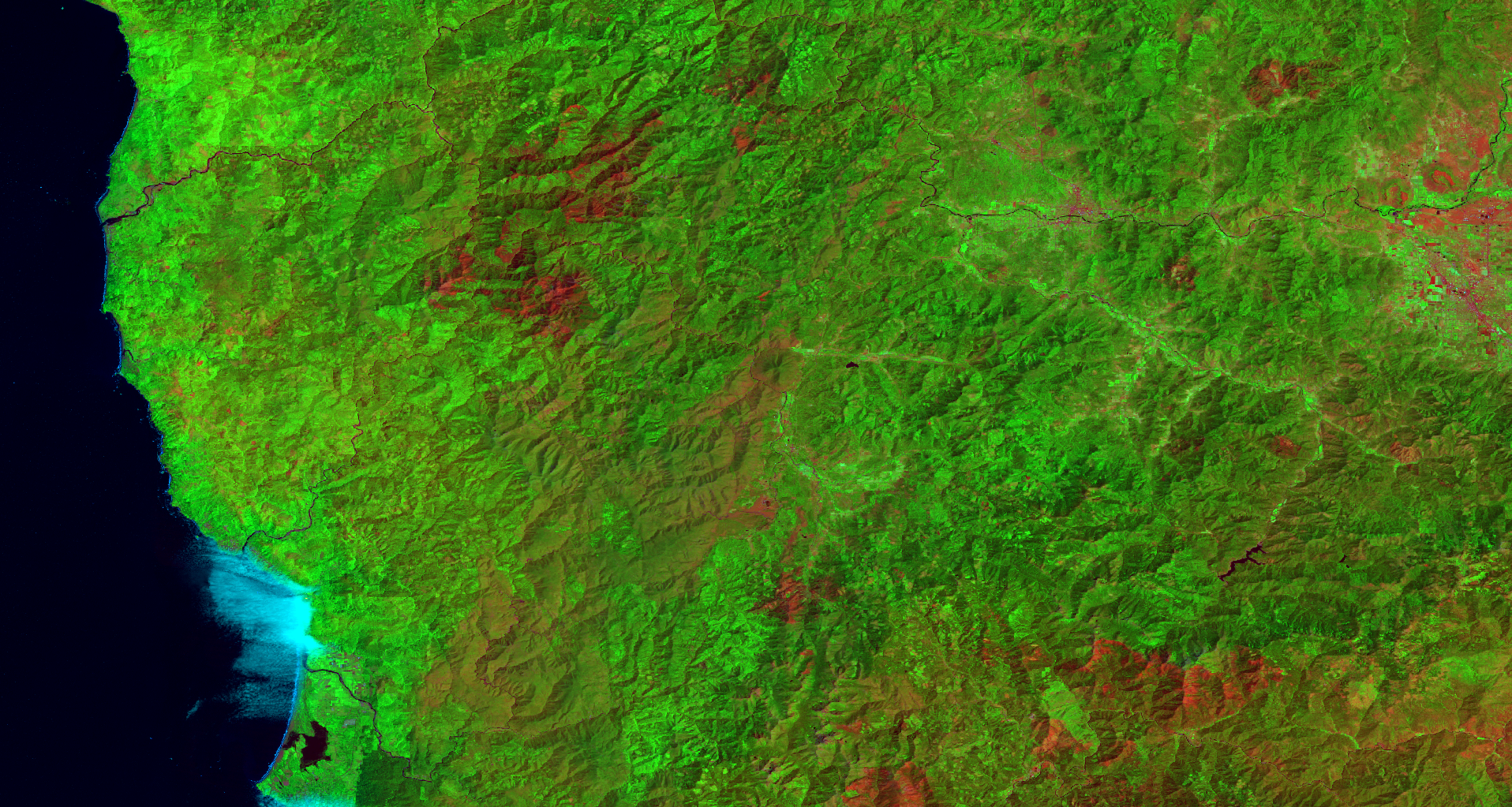
Silver Fire, 30 July 1988, Landsat 5 TM, false color, infrared, bands 642, satellite image.
