= Kalmiopsis Wilderness =

Wilderness area in Oregon, United States

- IUCN category Ib (wilderness area)
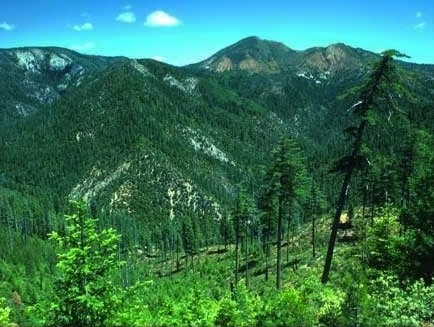
- Interactive map of Kalmiopsis Wilderness
- Location: Curry / Josephine counties, Oregon, United States
- Nearest city: Cave Junction, Oregon
- Coordinates: 42°16′57″N 123°57′48″W
- Area: 179,755 acres (72,744 ha)
- Established: 1964
- Governing body: United States Forest Service

Kalmiopsis Wilderness is a wilderness area in the Klamath Mountains of southwestern Oregon, within the Rogue River – Siskiyou National Forest. It was designated wilderness by the United States Congress in 1964 and now comprises a total of 179,755 acres (72,744 ha). There are approximately 153 miles (246 km) of trails on 24 established hiking trails in the area.

The Kalmiopsis Wilderness was named for Kalmiopsis leachiana, a slow-growing plant related to the rhododendron, which was discovered in the area in 1930.

== History ==
Historically, the Kalmiopsis Wilderness was a mining district. Gold was discovered about 1850, causing a gold rush into the area. A number of mining towns were built and more than a dozen hard rock mines were started. Many people lived there up into the mid-1940s. In 1962, many of the homes and stores were still habitable and all the mining equipment and buildings were still in place.

The wilderness area was established in 1964. In 2002, lightning started the Biscuit Fire that burned much of the area and damaged many of the hiking trails. Some of the trails destroyed in the fire re-opened in 2015.

== Topography ==
Elevations in Kalmiopsis Wilderness range from 500 to 5,098 feet (152 to 1,554 m), at Pearsoll Peak. The area is characterized by deep, rough canyons, sharp rock ridges, and clear, rushing mountain streams and rivers. The wilderness includes the headwater basins of the Chetco, North Fork Smith Rivers, as well as part of the Illinois River canyon. All three of these rivers have been designated Wild and Scenic.

== Geology ==
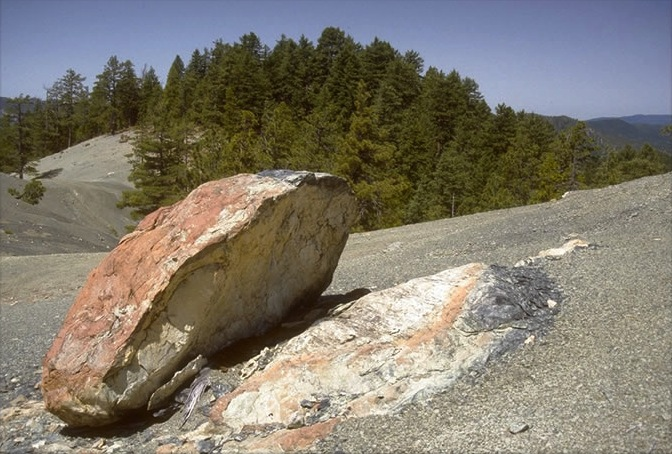
Serpentine Ridge.

The Kalmiopsis Wilderness is part of the Klamath Mountain geologic province of northwestern California and southwestern Oregon. The eastern half is part of the Josephine "ultramafic" sheet, meaning it has a very high iron and magnesium content. The western half of the Wilderness is underlain by the sedimentary rocks of the Dothan formation and by the igneous intrusive rocks of the Big Craggies. Most of the rocks in this province were formerly parts of the oceanic crust, and include serpentine, submarine volcanic flow rocks, intrusive granite-like rocks, and sedimentary rocks such as shale and sandstone. Historic mine sites for gold and chromite can still be found in the form of cabin sites, mines, and ditches.

== Vegetation ==
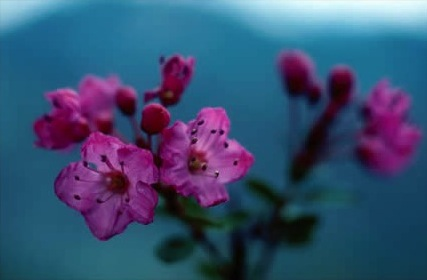
Kalmiopsis leachiana.

Diversity of topography and geology provide excellent habitat for a wide variety of botanical species. The Kalmiopsis leachiana plant was discovered in 1930 by Lilla Leach in the Gold Basin area. The plant is a relict of the pre-ice age and the oldest member of the Ericaceae Family, and is the namesake of the Kalmiopsis Wilderness. In 2002, the nearly 500,000-acre (200,000 ha) Biscuit Fire burned the entire wilderness area. The environment has changed dramatically and provides a unique opportunity to observe a natural response to fire disturbance through plant succession, erosional and depositional occurrences and changed habitat for flora and fauna. The Chetco Bar Fire re-burned large portions of the area in 2017.

== See also ==
- List of Oregon Wildernesses
- List of U.S. Wilderness Areas
- Wilderness Act
