= Biscuit Fire =

2002 Oregon wildfire

- Part of the 2002 California wildfires
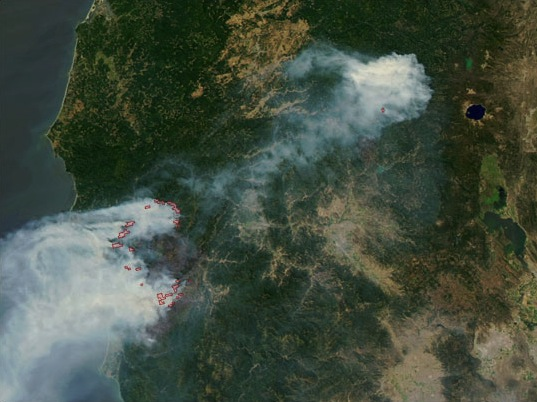
- NASA satellite image of the Biscuit Fire, on August 12, 2002
- Date: July 12, 2002 –; December 31, 2002; (173 days)
- Location: Siskiyou National Forest, Oregon and California, USA
- Coordinates: 42.05°N 123.883333°W

Statistics
- Burned area: 500,000 acres (2,000 km^{2}): 28,772 acres (116.44 km^{2}) in California; 471,228 acres (1,906.99 km^{2}) in Oregon
- Land use: Mixed, residential and wildlands

Impacts
- Deaths: None
- Injuries: Unknown
- Cost: Millions of dollars

Ignition
- Cause: Lightning

Map
- Location within California

The Biscuit Fire was a massive wildfire in 2002 that burned nearly 500,000 acres (780 sq mi; 2,000 km^{2}) in the Rogue River–Siskiyou National Forest, in southern Oregon and northern California, in the Western United States. The fire was named after Biscuit Creek in southern Oregon. The Biscuit Fire was the second-largest wildfire in the modern post-1900 history of Oregon. Oregon's largest fires are actually believed to have taken place in the 1800s. The Silverton Fire of 1865 is listed as Oregon's largest at over 900,000 acres. The Biscuit Fire area is subject to warm, dry winds known as the Brookings effect (also known as Chetco effect), driven by high pressure over the Great Basin. The fire re-burned portions of the 1987 Silver Fire, and much of its area was re-burned in the 2017 Chetco Bar Fire.

== The wildfire ==
The fire season in 2002 was an especially active one that started early with major fires in Arizona, Colorado, and New Mexico, pulling resources from the Pacific Northwest. Between July 12 and July 15, a series of lightning storms occurred in California and Oregon starting hundreds of small wildfires. During this period, five such fires were started within a 20-mile (32 km) radius of each other near the state border. Due to the fires already burning in other areas, insufficient numbers of fire crews and smokejumpers were available to combat these fires and they began to burn out of control. The large Florence Fire, which had started approximately 30 miles (48 km) north of the border, eventually joined what was known as the Sour Biscuit Fire, which was burning very close to the border. Once the massive Biscuit Fire was created, it ended up burning a total of 500,000 acres (2,000 km^{2}), and the fire was unable to be fully contained until December 31, 2002.

=== Damages ===
The fire destroyed 4 primary residences and 10 other structures, put 15,000 residents on evacuation notice and burned most of the 180,000-acre (730 km^{2}) Kalmiopsis Wilderness. Despite the level of destruction, there were no deaths attributed to the fire.

== Aftermath ==
Since the fire, the United States Forest Service has been trying to log most of the severely burnt area, despite ecologists' concerns about the Port Orford Cedar, which is threatened from a root-attacking fungal-like organism that is most commonly spread on car tires and shoes. This will be the largest recorded timber sale in U.S. history, and a landmark case setting the future for all fires in national forests. The cost of salvage logging far outweighed the proceeds from sales ($1.9 million).

In 2006, a research paper on the effects of post-wildfire salvage logging caused a controversy within the forest sciences community.

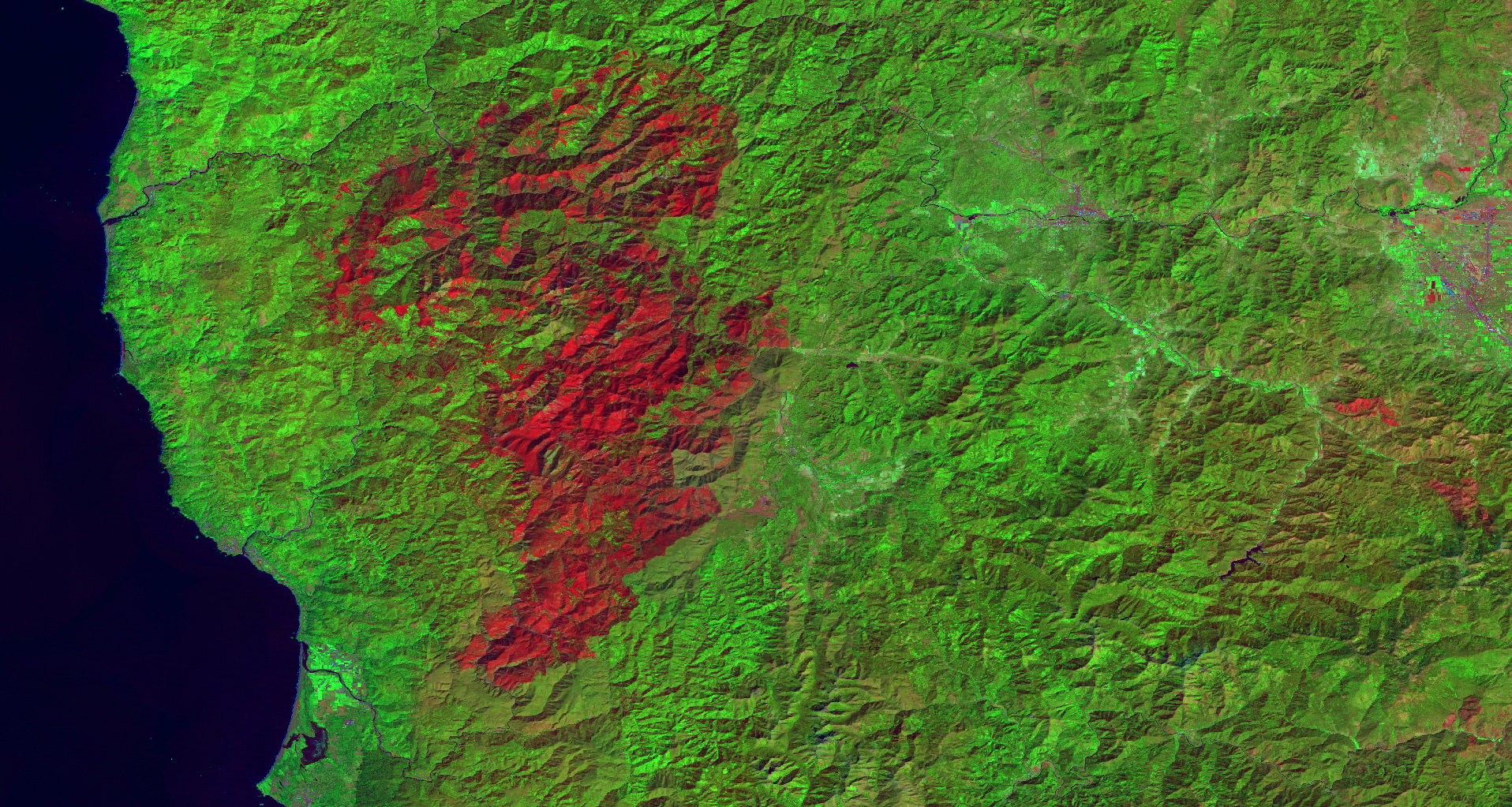
Biscuit Fire, 23 September 2002, Landsat 5 TM, false color infrared, bands 642. Data source: https://earthexplorer.usgs.gov/

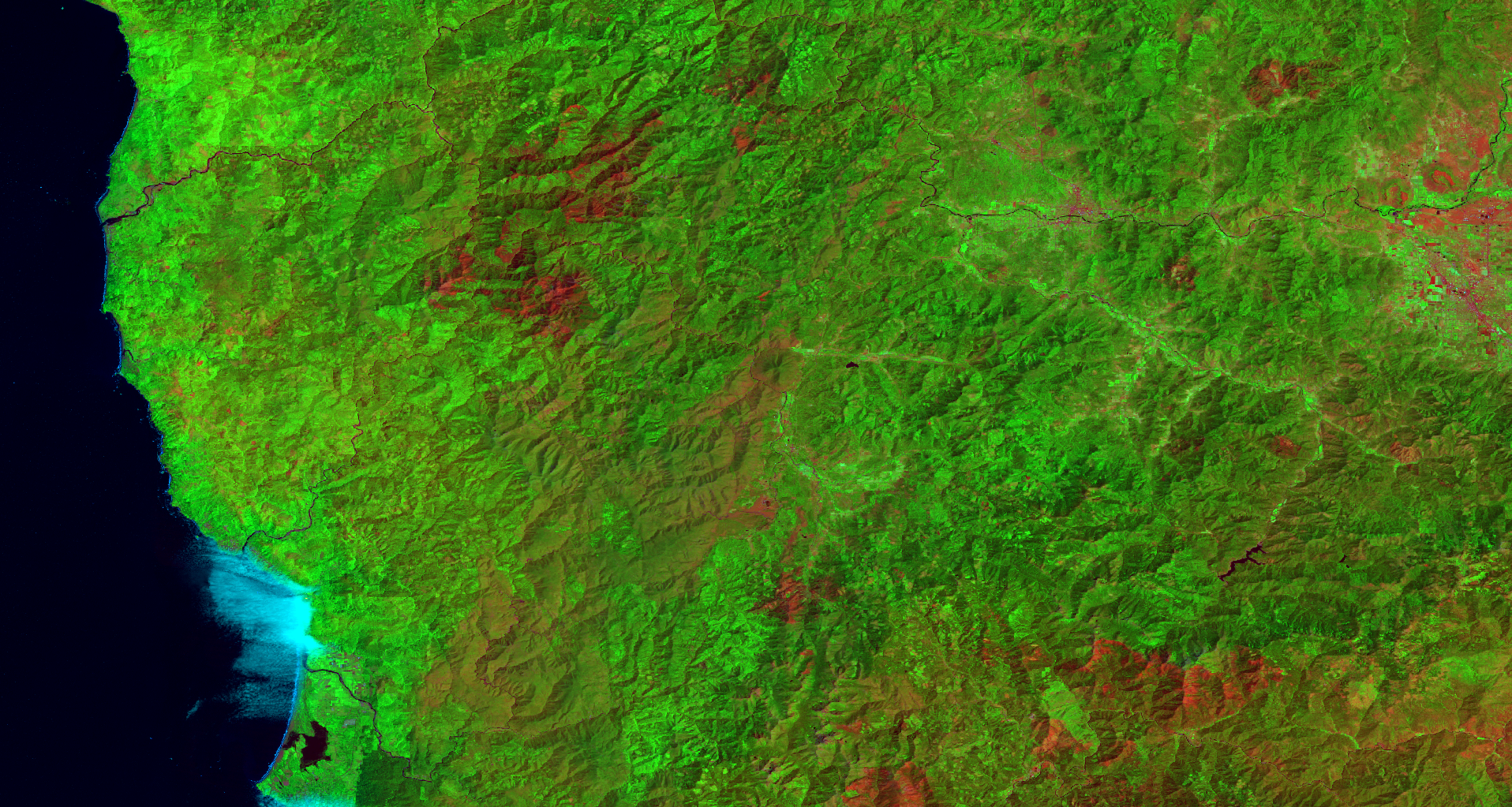
Silver Fire, 30 July 1988, Landsat 5 TM, false color infrared, bands 642. Data source: https://earthexplorer.usgs.gov/

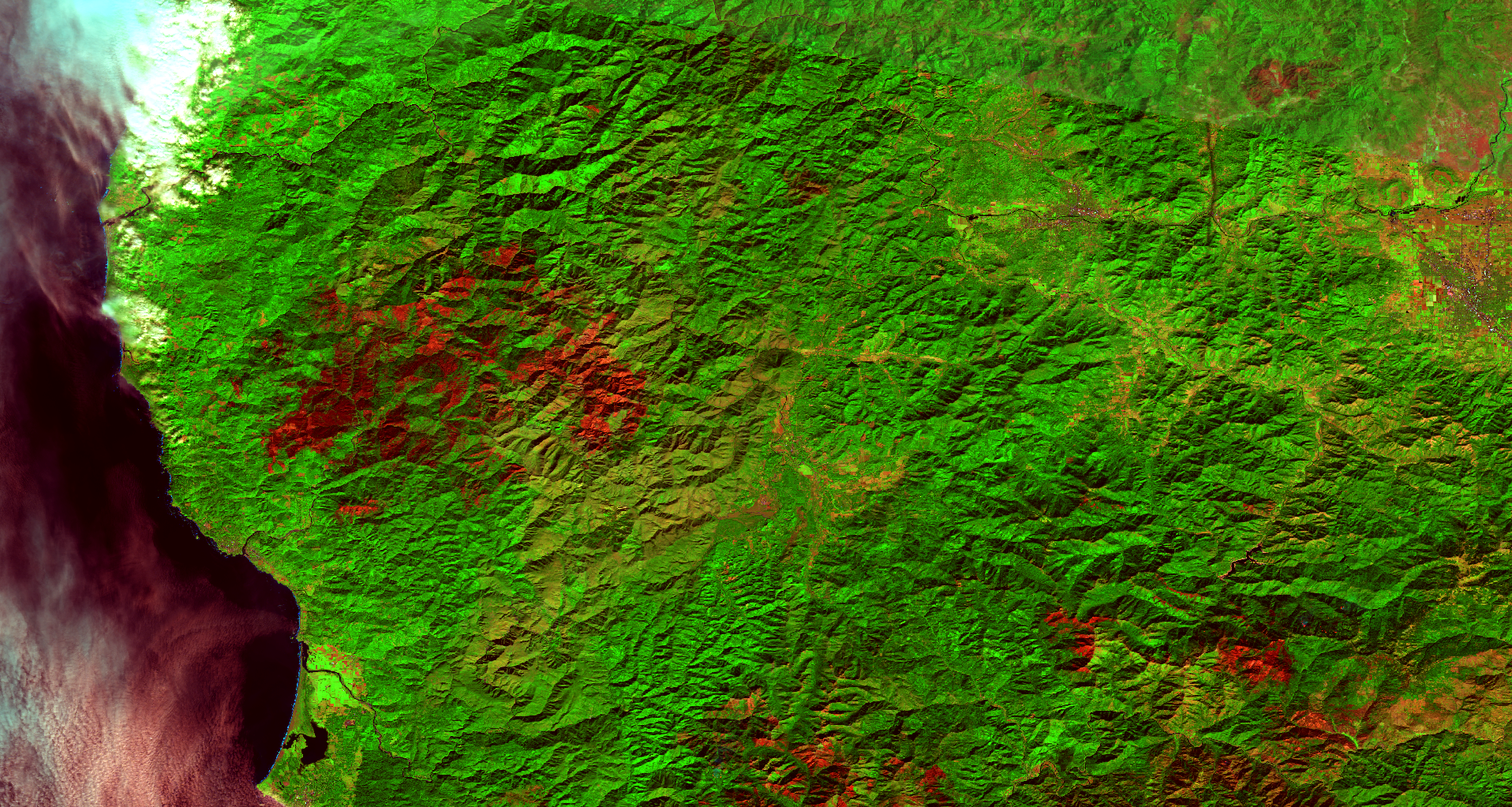
Chetco Bar Fire, 18 October 2017, Landsat 8 OLI, false color infrared, bands 758. Data source: https://earthexplorer.usgs.gov/

== See also ==
- 2002 California wildfires
- Fire ecology
- List of California Wildfires
- Wildfire suppression
