= Course of the Rogue River (Oregon) =

Rogue River
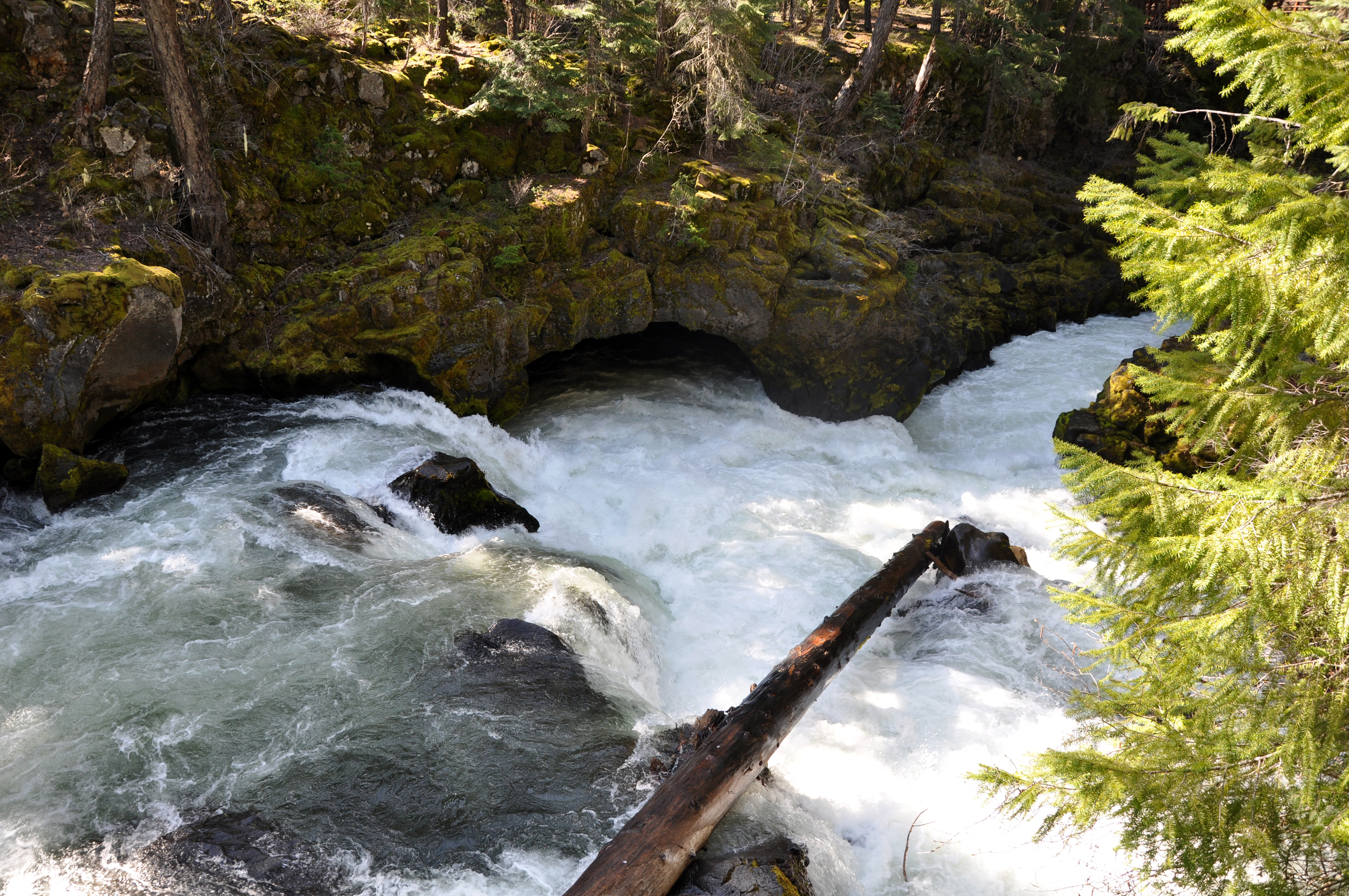
- Below Natural Bridge along the upper Rogue River

- Mouth of the Rogue River in Oregon
- Etymology: Coquins (rogues), used by early French visitors to the region to describe the local Indians

Location
- Country: United States
- State: Oregon
- County: Klamath, Douglas, Jackson, Josephine, and Curry
- City: Grants Pass

Physical characteristics
- Source: Boundary Springs in Crater Lake National Park
  - location: Cascade Range, Klamath County, Oregon
  - coordinates: 43°3′57″N 122°13′56″W
  - elevation: 5,320 ft (1,620 m)
- Mouth: Pacific Ocean
  - location: Gold Beach, Curry County, Oregon
  - coordinates: 42°25′21″N 124°25′45″W
  - elevation: 0 ft (0 m)
- Length: 215 mi (346 km)
- Basin size: 5,175 sq mi (13,400 km^{2})
- Discharge
  - location: near Agness, 29.7 miles (47.8 km) from the mouth
  - average: 6,622 cu ft/s (187.5 m^{3}/s)
  - minimum: 608 cu ft/s (17.2 m^{3}/s)
  - maximum: 290,000 cu ft/s (8,200 m^{3}/s)

The Rogue River in the U.S. state of Oregon begins at Boundary Springs on the border between Klamath and Douglas counties near the northern edge of Crater Lake National Park. The Rogue River flows generally west for 215 miles (346 km) from the Cascade Range through the Rogue River – Siskiyou National Forest and the Klamath Mountains to the Pacific Ocean at Gold Beach. Communities along its course include Union Creek, Prospect, Trail, Shady Cove, Gold Hill, and Rogue River, all in Jackson County; Grants Pass, and Galice in Josephine County, and Agness, Wedderburn and Gold Beach in Curry County. Significant tributaries include the South Fork Rogue River, Elk Creek, Bear Creek, the Applegate River, and the Illinois River. Arising at 5,320 feet (1,622 m) above sea level, the river loses more than 1 mile (1.6 km) in elevation by the time it reaches the Pacific.

Of the river's total length, 124 miles (200 km), or about 58 percent, is designated as National Wild and Scenic River – part on the upper Rogue and part on the lower Rogue. The Rogue is one of only three rivers that start in or east of the Cascade Mountain Range in Oregon and reach the Pacific Ocean. The others are the Umpqua River and Klamath River. These three Southern Oregon rivers drain the mountains south of the Willamette Valley. The Willamette River drains rivers to the north into the Columbia River, which starts in British Columbia rather than Oregon.

== Boundary Springs to Lost Creek Lake ==
Flowing out of Klamath County and into Douglas County at the headwaters spring, the river runs north for about 0.5 miles (0.8 km) before leaving the national park and entering the national forest. Crossing under National Forest Development Road (NFD) 9281, also known as Old Diamond Lake Road, the river turns west parallel to the Upper Rogue River Trail, which is on the right. Parallel to the river and slightly north of the trail is Oregon Route 230, also known as the West Diamond Lake Highway. Shortly thereafter, the stream goes over a waterfall, receives Cascade Creek from the right and then Mazama Creek from the left at about river mile (RM) 211 or river kilometer (RK) 340. Two more waterfalls occur in the next 2 miles (3.2 km) before the stream turns to the south, passes under NFD 4901 just before receiving Minnehaha Creek from the left near Minnehaha Campground. The stream then meanders through Hamaker Meadows and receives Hamaker Creek from the left before passing Hamaker Campground, which is on the right. At this point, the Upper Rogue River Trail crosses the stream on a footbridge and continues parallel to the river along the left bank. Muir Creek enters from the right at Muir Campground, at RM 204 (RK 328). Soon the Rogue receives Hurryon Creek from the left, Meadow and Lost creeks from the right, and National Creek from the left. Shortly thereafter, NFD 6530 crosses the road and so does the Upper Rogue River Trail, which continues parallel to the river on the right bank. About 1 mile (1.6 km) later, the river leaves Douglas County and enters Jackson County near RM 198 (RK 319).

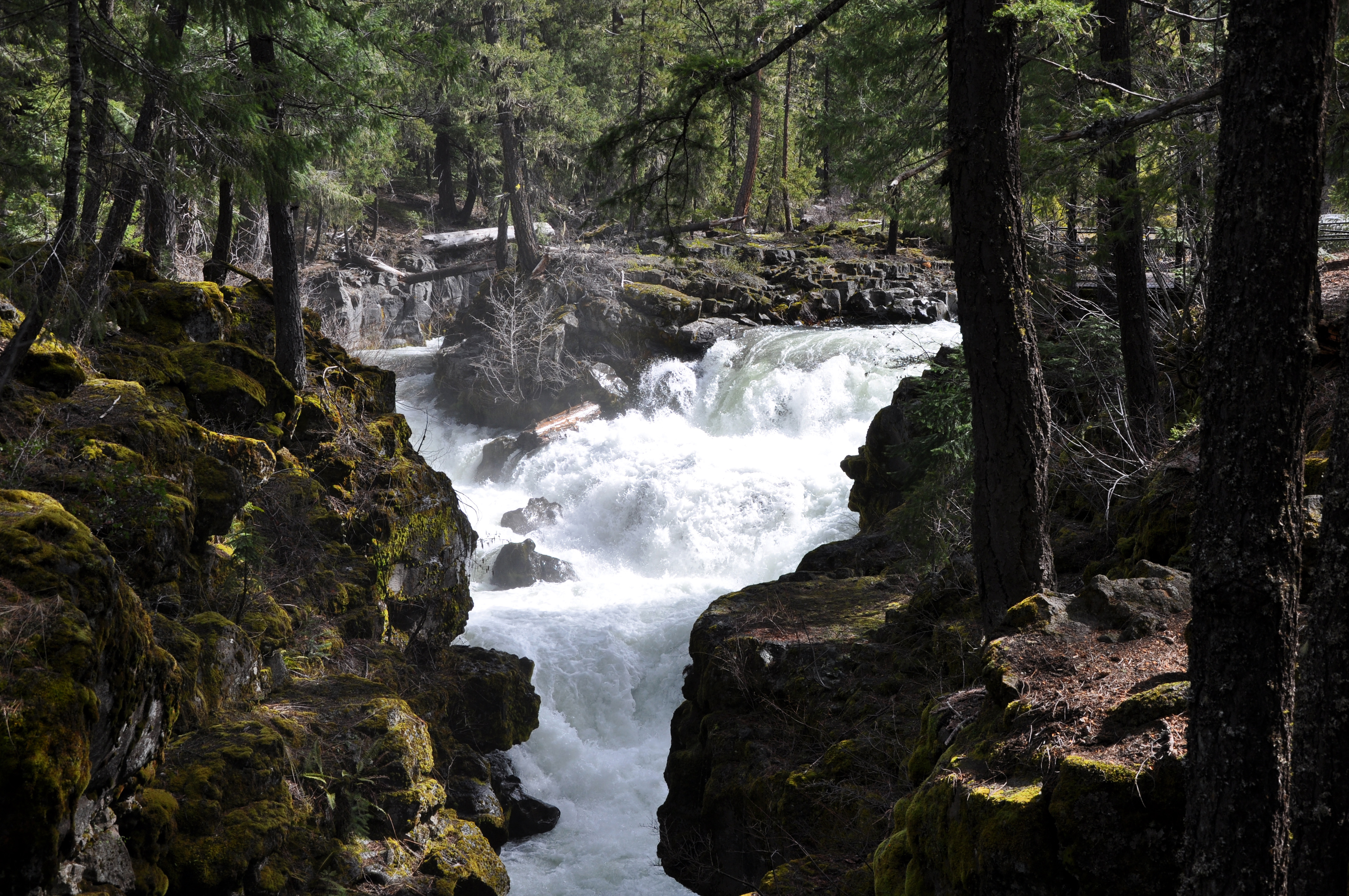
The upper Rogue plunges into Rogue River Gorge at Union Creek, Oregon.

Soon the river receives Wizard and Copeland creeks from the left and passes under Oregon Route 230, which continues roughly parallel to the river along the left bank. Next, Foster and Prairie creeks enter from the left, Bridge, and Brown creeks from the right, and Bybee and Castle creeks from the left. NFD 6510 crosses the river between the latter two creeks, and Route 230 ends shortly thereafter where it meets Oregon Route 62, also known as the Crater Lake Highway. This highway continues roughly parallel to the river on its left bank. Turning southwest at Farewell Bend Campground, on the right at RM 188 (RK 303), the river enters Rogue River Gorge, receiving Union Creek from the left near the unincorporated community of Union Creek and the Union Creek Historic District and Flat Creek from the right shortly thereafter. Below Flat Creek, the Upper Rogue River Trail crosses the river on a footbridge at RM 185 (RK 298), just above Natural Bridge Campground and Natural Bridge. Passing over a waterfall about 1 mile (1.6 km) later, the river passes under Woodruff Bridge, which carries Abbot Creek Road, at the Woodruff Bridge Picnic Area, which lies to the left. The river receives Abbott Creek from the right shortly thereafter and turns south. The stream then flows through Takelma Gorge and passes River Bridge Campground, which is on the left. At this point, NFD 64 crosses the river. Between here and the unincorporated community of Prospect at about RM 172 (RK 277), the river receives Kiter, Latson, Deep, Lund, Graham, and Schoolma'am creeks, all from the right. At Prospect, the river enters a reservoir behind a diversion dam that receives water from a canal on the left and releases water via a canal on the right to hydroelectricity projects. Below the dam, Route 62 and, shortly after, Mill Creek Drive, cross the river and continue parallel to it along the right bank. The average stream gradient over the 43 miles (69 km) between the headwaters and Prospect is very high, about 62 feet per mile (12 m/km).

Just below Prospect, the Rogue, flowing southwest, passes Prospect State Scenic Viewpoint, which is on the left, and receives Mill and Barr creeks from the left, both as waterfalls. Thereafter, water from the lower end of the Prospect diversion-dam canal enters from the right, and the river passes a United States Geological Survey (USGS) stream gauge about 169 miles (272 km) from the mouth. Skookum Creek soon enters from the right and the South Fork Rogue River from the left. About 2 miles (3.2 km) downstream, the river receives Cold Spring Creek from the left and then Hole in the Ground Creek from the right. Soon the river enters Lost Creek Lake and passes under Route 62, which continues parallel to the lake on the left. At this point, Joseph H. Stewart State Recreation Area is also on the left. While part of the lake, the river receives Blue Gulch from the right, Lost and Rumley creeks from the left, and a second Lost Creek from the right before reaching the dam spillway at about RM 157 (RK 253).

== Lost Creek Lake to the Applegate River ==
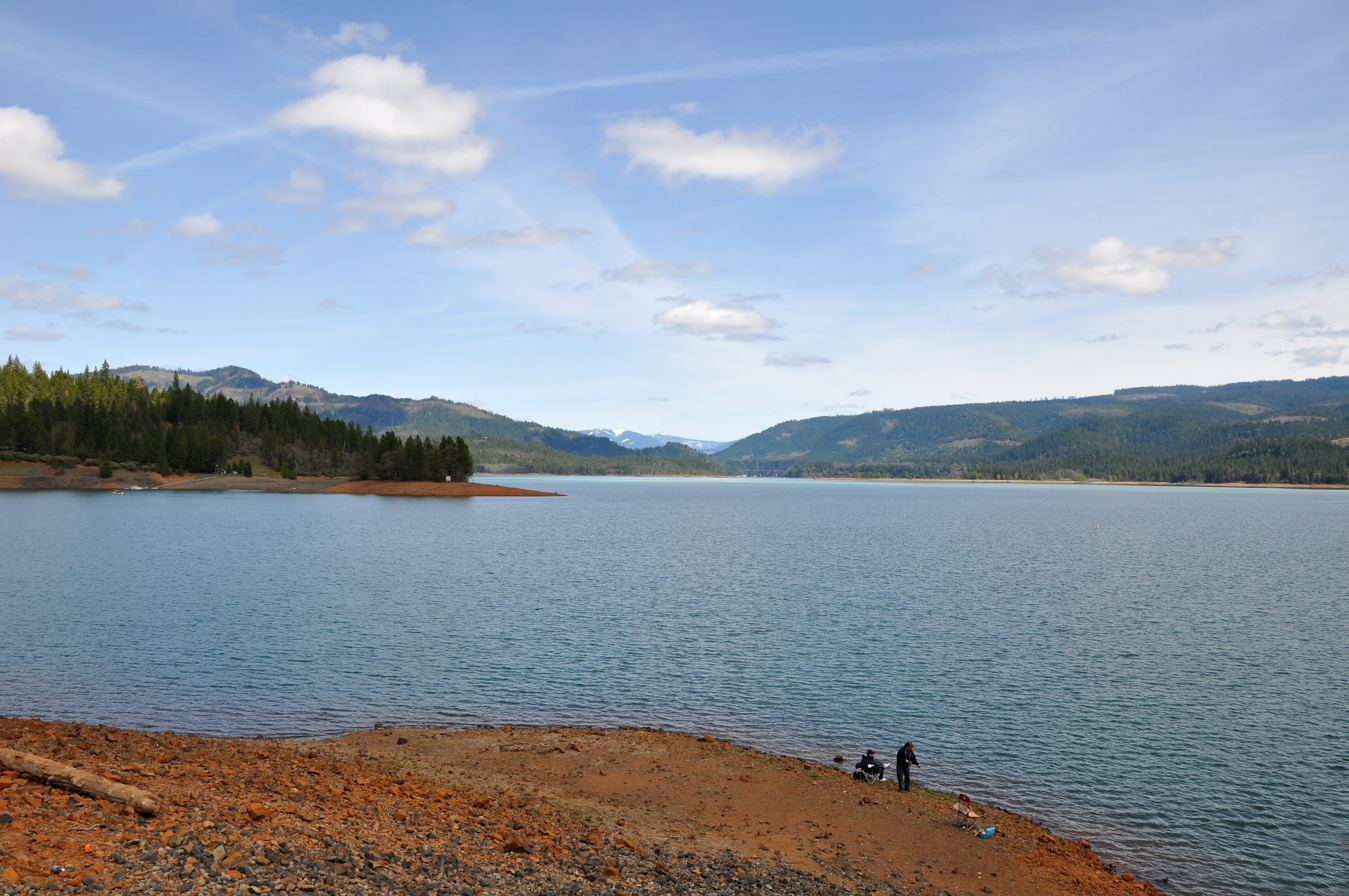
View of Lost Creek Lake, looking east from the top of the William L. Jess Dam

About 2 miles (3.2 km) later, the river passes under Route 62 again, receives Big Butte Creek from the left, and enters Casey State Recreation Site. Flowing west, about 3 miles (4.8 km) downstream, the river receives Elk Creek from the right. Over the next stretch, the Rogue River receives Bush Creek from the right, Brush Creek from the left, Lewis Creek from the right, passes the unincorporated community of Trail, receives Trail and Cricket creeks from the right, passes under Route 62 again and through the city of Shady Cove. Below the city, the river flows parallel to Route 62 on its left and Rogue River Drive on its right. The stream receives Indian Creek from the left, Branch Creek from the left, passes Takelma County Park, receives Langel Creek from the left and Dry Creek from the right before reaching the Dodge Bridge gauging station at about RM 139 (RK 224) and passing under Oregon Route 234, also known as Sams Valley Highway.

Over the next stretch, the river receives Hog Creek from the left, passes Rattlesnake Rapids at RM 136 (RK 219), receives Little Butte Creek from the left, flows through Denman Wildlife Area and by TouVelle State Recreation Site, which is on its left. As it leaves TouVelle, it passes under Table Rock Road. Over the next few miles, the river flows by several gravel pits on the left and right near the Agate Desert and Kelly Slough. Whetstone and Bear creeks enter from the left as the river approaches the site of the former Gold Ray Dam, which was removed in 2010, and a USGS gauge at about 126 miles (203 km) from the mouth. The river then passes Fishers Ferry Park, which is on the left, and receives Sams Creek and Water Gulch from the right.

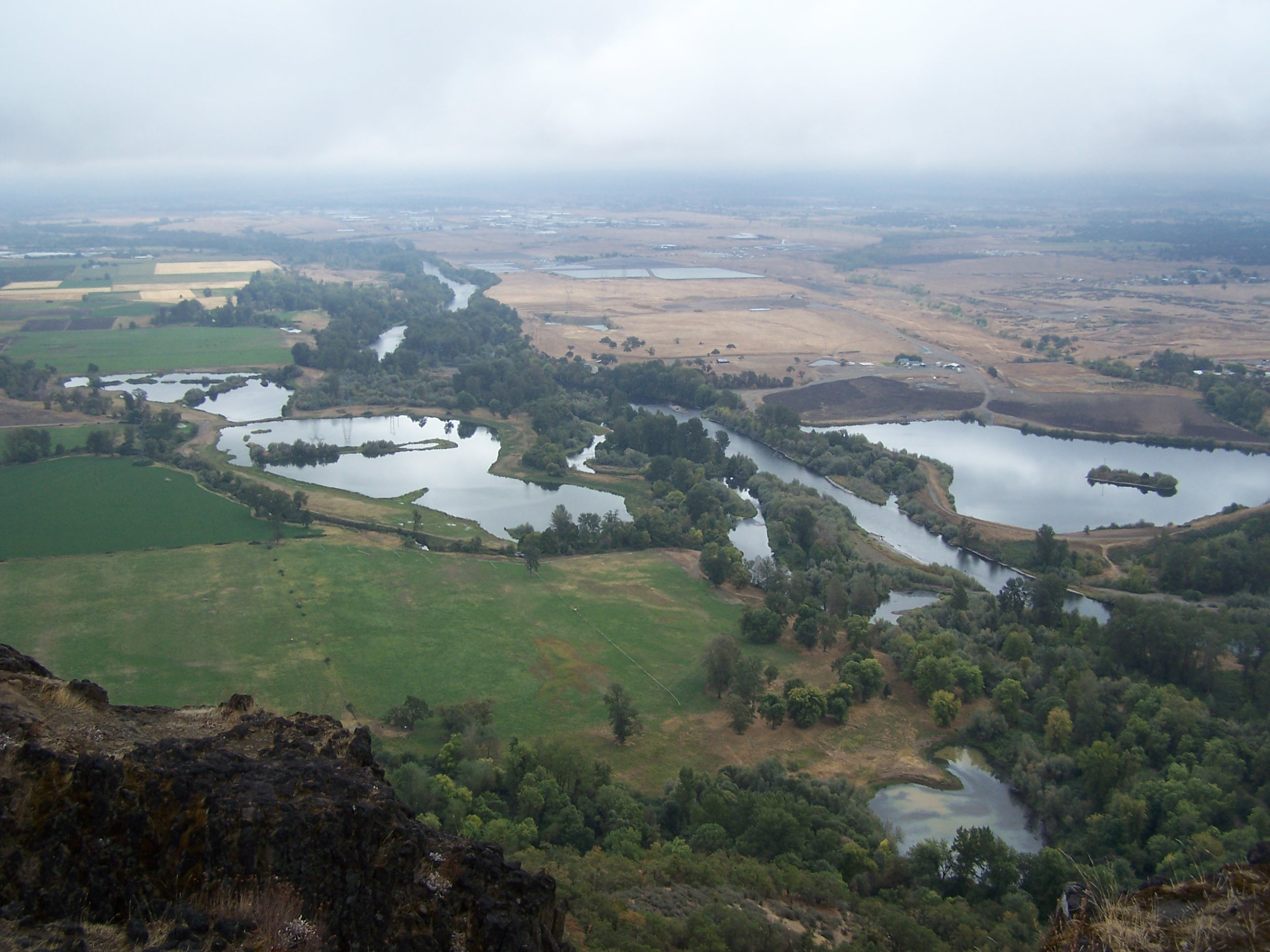
View of the river from Lower Table Rock

At this point, Route 234 runs along the right bank of the river. Flowing by the former Gold Hill Dam and then the Gold Nugget Recreation Area and the Gold Hill Regional Park, both to the river's right, the Rogue passes under Route 234 and Oregon Route 99. It turns west, flowing between the city of Gold Hill and Route 99 on the right and the Ben Hur Lampman State Scenic Corridor and Interstate 5 (I-5), both on the left, at about RM 119 (RK 192). The Rogue receives Galls Creek from the left and Sardine Creek from the right before passing under Route 99, which continues parallel to it on the left. Crossing under I-5, the river flows between it, now on the right, and Highway 99 along the edge of Valley of the Rogue State Park to about RM 110 (RK 180), where it receives Foots and Birdseye creeks from the left and passes the city of Rogue River, which is on the right bank. Further on, it receives Ward and Evans creeks from the right and Little Savage and Savage creeks from the left. It reaches the site of former Savage Rapids Dam at about RM 107.5 (RK 173), where it leaves Jackson County and enters Josephine County. Downstream, the river receives Rich Gulch from the right, passes Tom Pearce Park, receives Greens Creek from the left, Jones Creek from the right, Fruitdale Creek from the left, enters Grants Pass, and flows by a USGS gauge about 102 miles (164 km) from the river mouth. In the city, it passes under U.S. Route 199 and Route 99. Allen Creek enters from the left before the river flows by Schroeder Park, on the left, and Lathrop Boat Landing, on the right shortly thereafter. Sand Creek enters from the left, and Vannoy Creek from the right before the Applegate River enters from the left at about RM 95 (RK 153). The average stream gradient from the vicinity of Bear Creek to the Applegate River, is relatively low, 10 feet per mile (1.9 m/km).

== Applegate River to Agness ==
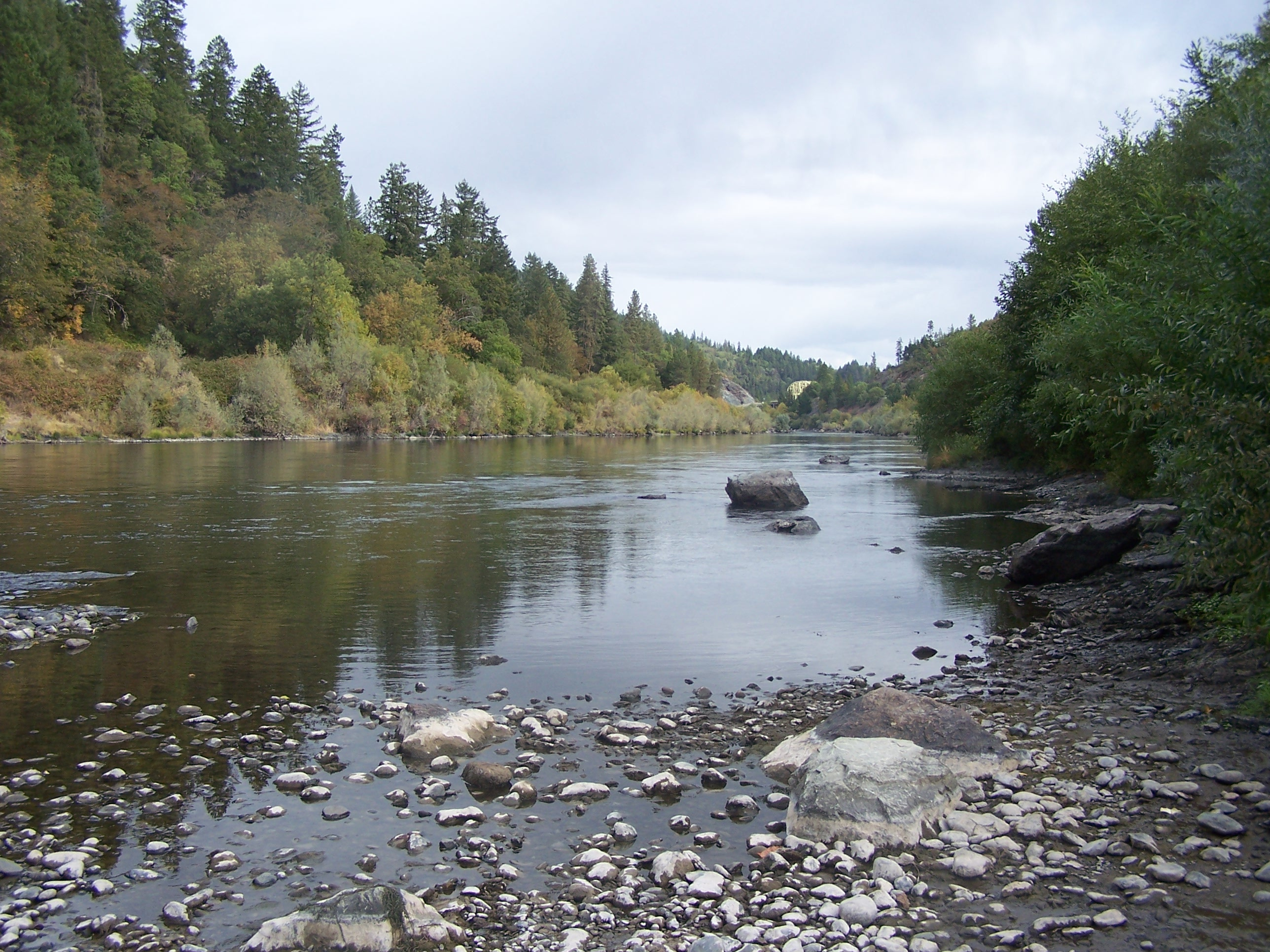
Near Indian Mary Park

Whitehorse Park is on the right just below the confluence with the Applegate River, the start of the Rogue's lower Wild and Scenic section of 84 miles (135 km). Near the park, Pass Creek enters from the right, Shan Creek from the left, and the river passes between Griffin Park on the left and Ferry Park on the right at RM 90 (RK 140). About 3 miles (4.8 km) later, the river flows under Robertson Bridge, and receives Rickett and Pickett creeks from the left, Jumpoff Joe and Hog creeks from the right, and Serpentine Gulch from the left before entering Hellgate Canyon and receiving Zigzag Creek from the left at about RM 82 (RK 132) and Little Zigzag Creek shortly thereafter. In the next stretch, the river passes under Galice Road, which runs parallel to the river along the left bank as far as Grave Creek. Then the river flows by Indian Mary Park, which is on the left, receives Stratton Creek from the right before passing through Taylor Gorge to Taylor Bar, where it receives Taylor Creek from the left. Further downstream, the river receives Delta and Paint creeks from the right, Spangler Gulch and Galice Creek from the left, and arrives at Galice, which is on the left. Below Galice, the river receives Rich and Rocky gulches from the left, Maple Gulch from the right, Hooks Gulch from the left, Belknap Gulch from the right, and North Star Gulch from the left. Next comes the unincorporated community of Rand and the historic Rand Ranger Station on the left, Ash Gulch on the right, Centennial Gulch on the right, and Almeda County Park, which is on the left. Below Almeda, Yew Wood Creek enters from the left, and Bailey, Argo, Smith, and Mouse creeks and Smith Gulch enter from the left. The Rogue then receives Grave Creek from the right, and passes under the Grave Creek Bridge. From Grave Creek to Illahe Campground, the Lower Rogue River Trail runs parallel to the river on the right bank.

At this point, the river turns sharply west, passes Grave Creek Falls, and receives Ajax Gulch from the right. Flowing past Sanderson Island, the river receives Singletree Gulch from the right just upstream of Rainie Falls. China Gulch soon enters from the right at China Gulch Rapids, and Rum Creek enters from the left and Whisky Creek from the right near Whisky Creek Cabin. Just below, the river passes through Big Slide Riffle, then receives Alder Creek from the right before reaching Tyee Bar on the left. Booze Creek enters from the right, and the rivers flows through Tyee Rapids and then Wildcat Rapids. Below the rapids, Wildcat Creek enters from the left just before Russian Creek enters from the right and the river enters Russian Rapids. Almost immediately, the river reaches Montgomery Rapids, where Montgomery Creek enters from the left. Next comes Howard Creek Chute, where Howard Creek enters from the left. Bronco Creek enters from the right at Slim Pickins Rapids, which precedes Ploughshare Rapids and Windy Creek Chute. Bunker Creek enters from the right and Big Windy Creek from the left before the river reaches Upper and Lower Black Bar Falls and Black Bar. Soon, Little Windy and Jenny creeks enter from the left before the river reaches Horseshoe Bend, where Shady, Francis, Copsey, and Cowley creeks all enter from the right. The river then receives Meadow Creek from the right and Dulog Creek from the left. At RM 55 (RK 89), the Rogue flows out of Josephine County and into Curry County.

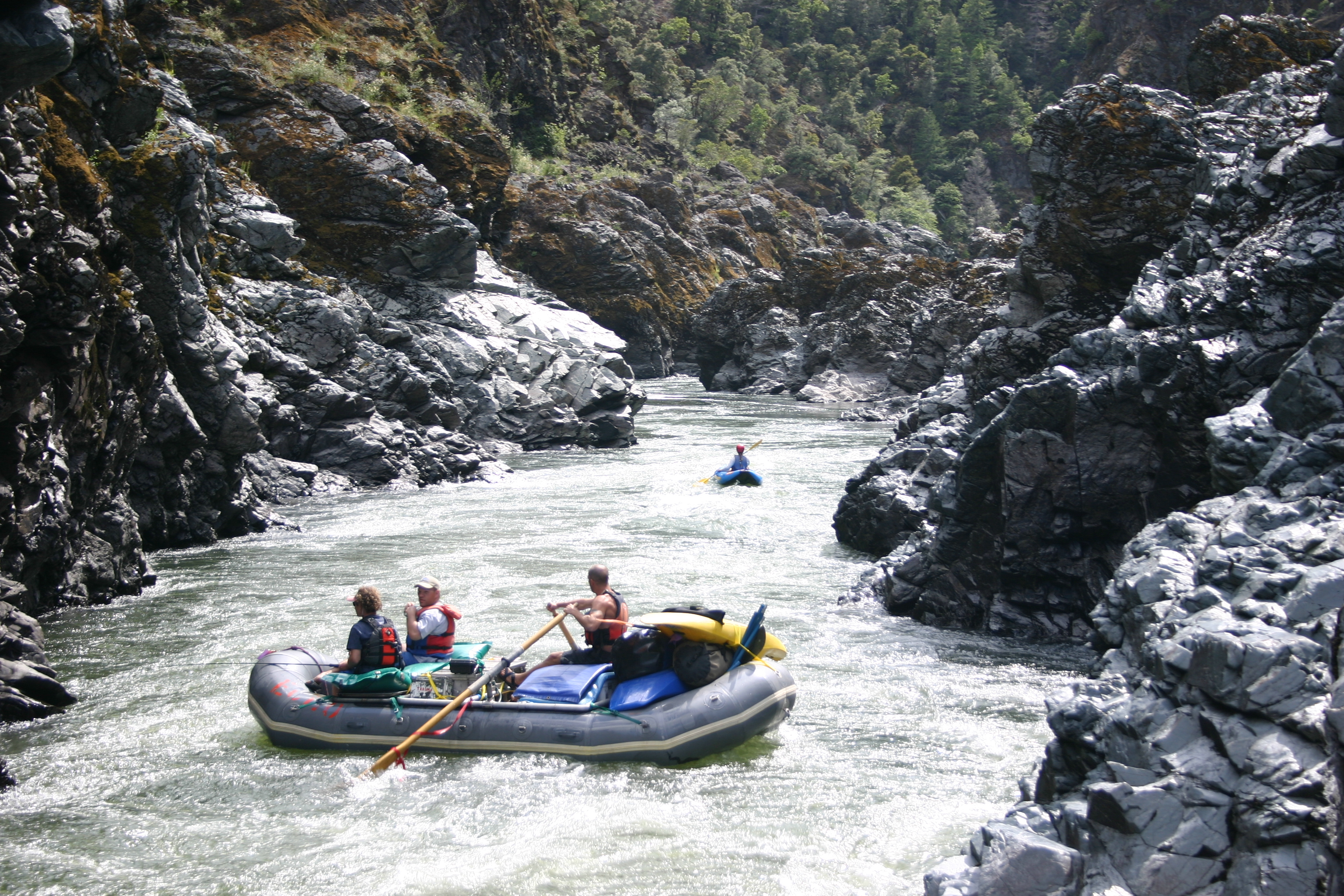
Rafting Mule Canyon on the lower Rogue

Beyond the county border, Corral, Ditch, and Slide creeks enter from the right near Battle Bar. Hewitt Creek enters from the left near Winkle Bar Airport at RM 53 (RK 85). Below this, the Rogue receives Missouri Creek from the left, Quail Creek from the right, Long Gulch from the left before the river passes through Big Boulder Rapids. Flowing through Island Rapids at RM 50 (RK 80), the river continues to China Bar, China Bar Rapids, and Rogue River Ranch, which is on the right. Here, Mule Creek enters from the right before the river enters Mule Creek Canyon and arrives at Marial at RM 48 (RK 77). The river turns southwest and enters the Narrows and then the Coffeepot, receives Stair Creek from the left at Stair Creek Falls, passes Inspiration Point, which is on the right, and flows through Blossom Bar Rapids, where Burns and Blossom Bar creeks enter from the right. Below Blossom Bar, the river flows through the Devils Stairs, passes Gleason Bar, receives Paradise and Jackson creeks from the right, and flows through Huggins Canyon before receiving East Creek from the left and Brushy Bar Creek from the right. Further on, Tate Creek enters from the right at RM 40 (RK 64), just above Camp Tacoma. The river flows through Tacoma Rapids and receives Clay Hill Creek from the right before entering Clay Hill Rapids, after which the river enters the Clay Hill Stillwater and receives Fall Creek from the left and Flora Dell Creek from the right. Below this, Hicks Creek enters from the right and then Slide Creek from the left. Dans Creek enters from the right just above Burnt Rapids, then Watson Creek enters from the left.

The Rogue then rounds Big Bend, where it receives Billings Creek from the right and flows through Billings Rapids. Below Big Bend, the Agness-Illahe Road and to its right, NFD Road 33 parallel the river on the right bank. The river flows through Foster Rapids, where it passes Foster Bar on the left and receives Billy Creek from the right. Next comes Illahe Campground, on the right bank at RM 33 (RK 53). Little Wildcat Rapids begins the next stretch. Below this, Lone Tree Creek enters from the right just before Old Diggins Rapids, below which Twomile Creek enters from the right just before Twomile Rapids. Next comes Walker Bar, where Walker Creek enters from the left, and below this Slide Creek enters from the right. At this point, NFD Road 33 crosses the river and continues along the left bank, while the Agness-Illahe Road continues on the right bank. Waters Creek enters from the right just above a USGS stream gauge at about RM 30 (RK 48). The river receives Shasta Costa and Snout creeks from the left before arriving at Agness, which is on the left bank. Here the Illinois River enters from the right at RM 27 (RK 43). From Galice to Agness, the average gradient of the river is 18 feet per mile (3.4 m/km).

== Agness to Gold Beach ==
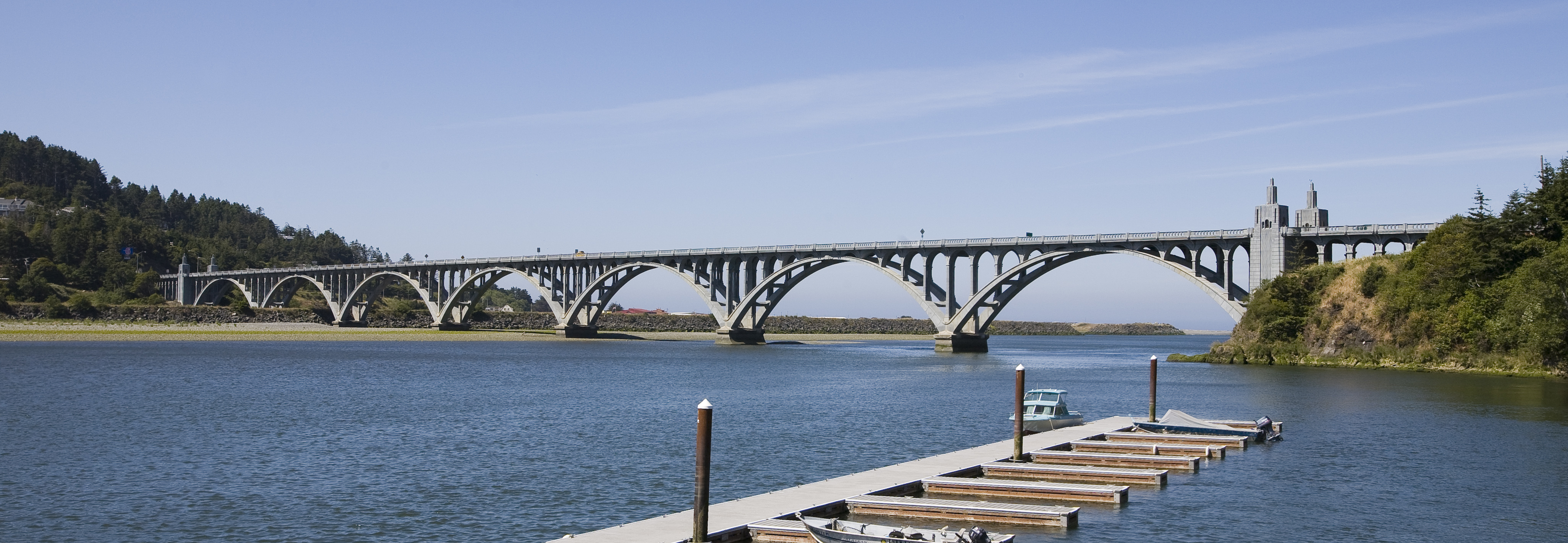
The lower river passes under the Isaac Lee Patterson Bridge and U.S. Route 101 at Gold Beach.

Just below Agness, the Agness–Illahe Road crosses the river to join NFD 33, also known as Agness Road, which continues parallel to the river on the left bank. The river, passing through Copper Canyon, receives Tom Fry Creek from the left, Rilea, Blue Jay, Morris Rodgers, and Painted Rock creeks from the right. It receives Stonehouse and Sundown creeks from the right, passes through Bear Canyon, below which Bridge Creek enters from the right at RM 22 (RK 35). Flowing through Little Canyon, the river receives Nail Keg Creek from the left and Schoolhouse, Tom East, and Auberry creeks from the right. In the next stretch, Wakeup Rilea Creek enters from the left, then Dog and Slide creeks from the right, followed by Bill Moore Creek, which enters from the left at RM 19 (RK 31). Shortly thereafter, Little Silver Creek enters from the right and then Silver Creek, also from the right, and Quosantana and William Miller creeks from the left. The Rogue then passes under a bridge and reaches Lobster Bar at about RM 11 (RK 18), where it leaves the Rogue River National Wild and Scenic area and shortly thereafter the Rogue River – Siskiyou National Forest. Lobster Creek enters from the right at Lobster Bar. The bridge, where NFD 33 and Agness Road terminate, connects the North Bank Rogue River Road, on the river's right bank, to Jerry's Flat Road, on the left. Both continue parallel to the river as far as U.S. Route 101, near the river mouth. Below Lobster Bar, Abe Creek enters from the right, Kimball Creek from the left, Libby Creek from the right, Jim Hunt Creek from the left, and Squaw and Edson creeks from the right as the lower river flows by a series of sand bars. The river receives Indian Creek from the left just before passing under U.S. Route 101 between Wedderburn on the right and Gold Beach on the left and entering the Pacific Ocean. Between Agness and the coast, the river gradient averages 3.7 feet per mile (0.7 m/km).

== Discharge ==
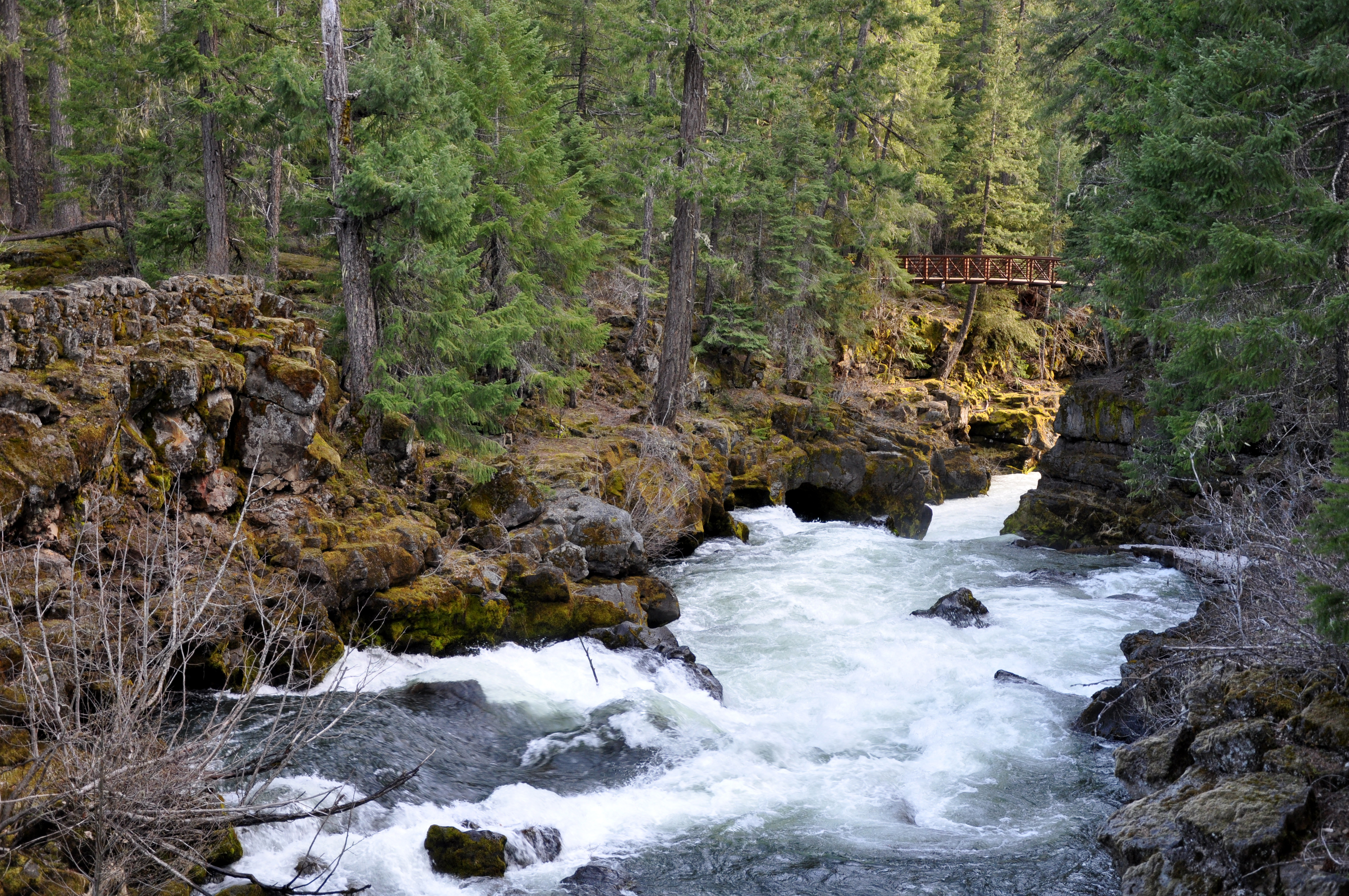
Below Natural Bridge on the upper river

The United States Geological Survey (USGS) operates five stream gauges along the Rogue River. A gauge 2 miles (3.2 km) downstream of Prospect and 169.4 miles (272.6 km) from the mouth of the river recorded an average discharge of 1,453 cubic feet per second (41 m^{3}/s) between 1969 and 2007. Fluctuations caused by a power plant 600 feet (180 m) upstream affected the flow as did small diversions for irrigation. The maximum flow recorded at this station was 12,200 cubic feet per second (345 m^{3}/s) on January 1, 1997. The minimum flow, related to regulation by upstream diversion gates, was 166 cubic feet per second (5 m^{3}/s) on September 29, 1992. Before the period of record for this gauge, the maximum flow since at least 1890, based on flood marks and on records from downstream gauge stations, was 25,000 cubic feet per second (708 m^{3}/s) on December 22, 1964. The Prospect gauge measures the flow from an area of 379 square miles (980 km^{2}), which is about 7 percent of the Rogue watershed.

At Dodge Bridge near Eagle Point, a gauge recorded an average flow of 2,636 cubic feet per second (75 m^{3}/s) between 1939 and 1977 and 2,389 cubic feet per second (68 m^{3}/s) between 1978 and 2007. The flow was regulated by Lost Creek Lake after 1977. The maximum discharge recorded at this station was 87,600 cubic feet per second (2,481 m^{3}/s) on December 22, 1964, and the minimum was 567 cubic feet per second (16 m^{3}/s) on February 18, 1977, because of the closure of the Lost Creek dam. Before that, the minimum was 611 cubic feet per second (17 m^{3}/s) on August 6, 14, and 29, 1940, and September 9, 1940. This gauge, 4.3 miles (6.9 km) northwest of Eagle Point and 138.6 miles (223.1 km) from the mouth of the river, measures the flow from an area of 1,215 square miles (3,150 km^{2}), about 23 percent of the Rogue watershed.

Just below Gold Ray Dam, 5.6 miles (9.0 km) northwest of Central Point at river mile (RM) 125.8 or river kilometer (RK) 202.5, a gauge recorded an average flow of 2,998 cubic feet per second (85 m^{3}/s) between 1906 and 1976 and 2,809 cubic feet per second (80 m^{3}/s) between 1977 and 2007. Starting in 1977, the flow was regulated by Lost Creek Lake and slightly regulated by Fish Lake and Emigrant Lake. Many irrigation diversions operate upstream of this gauge, which measures flow from a drainage area of 2,053 square miles (5,320 km^{2}), about 40 percent of the Rogue watershed. The maximum discharge recorded at this station was 131,000 cubic feet per second (3,710 m^{3}/s) on December 23, 1964, and the minimum discharge was 418 cubic feet per second (12 m^{3}/s) on September 19, 1968, a result of regulation.

A gauge at Grants Pass, 101.9 miles (164.0 km) from the river mouth, recorded an average discharge of 3,543 cubic feet per second (100 m^{3}/s) during the years from 1939 to 1977 and 3,246 cubic feet per second (92 m^{3}/s) for the years from 1978 through 2007. Maximum flow was 152,000 cubic feet per second (4,300 m^{3}/s) on December 23, 1964, and the minimum flow was 195 cubic feet per second (6 m^{3}/s) on January 30, 1961. The drainage area above this gauge was 2,459 square miles (6,370 km^{2}), roughly 48 percent of the Rogue watershed.

The average discharge recorded by a gauge 1.5 miles (2.4 km) north of Agness, 2.6 miles (4.2 km) upstream of the Illinois River and at RM 29.7 or RK 47.8 was 6,622 cubic feet per second (188 m^{3}/s). The maximum discharge during this period was 290,000 cubic feet per second (8,200 m^{3}/s) on December 23, 1964, and the minimum discharge was 608 cubic feet per second (17 m^{3}/s) on July 9 and 10, 1968. This was from a drainage basin of 3,939 square miles (10,202 km^{2}), or about 76 percent of the entire Rogue watershed.

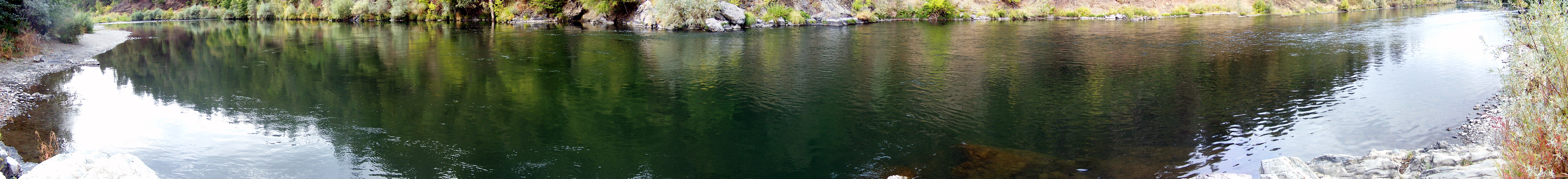
Panorama of the Rogue River near Indian Mary Park

== See also ==
- Rogue Valley
- List of rivers of Oregon
- List of National Wild and Scenic Rivers

== Works cited ==
- Benke, Arthur C., ed., and Cushing, Colbert E., ed.; Carter, James L.; Resh, Vincent H. (2005). "Chapter 12: Pacific Coast Rivers of the Coterminous United States" in Rivers of North America. Burlington, Massachusetts: Elsevier Academic Press. ISBN 0-12-088253-1.
- Loy, William G., ed., et al.. (2001). Atlas of Oregon. Eugene, Oregon: University of Oregon Press. ISBN 0-87114-102-7.
