= Marial, Oregon =

Community in Oregon, United States

- Unincorporated community
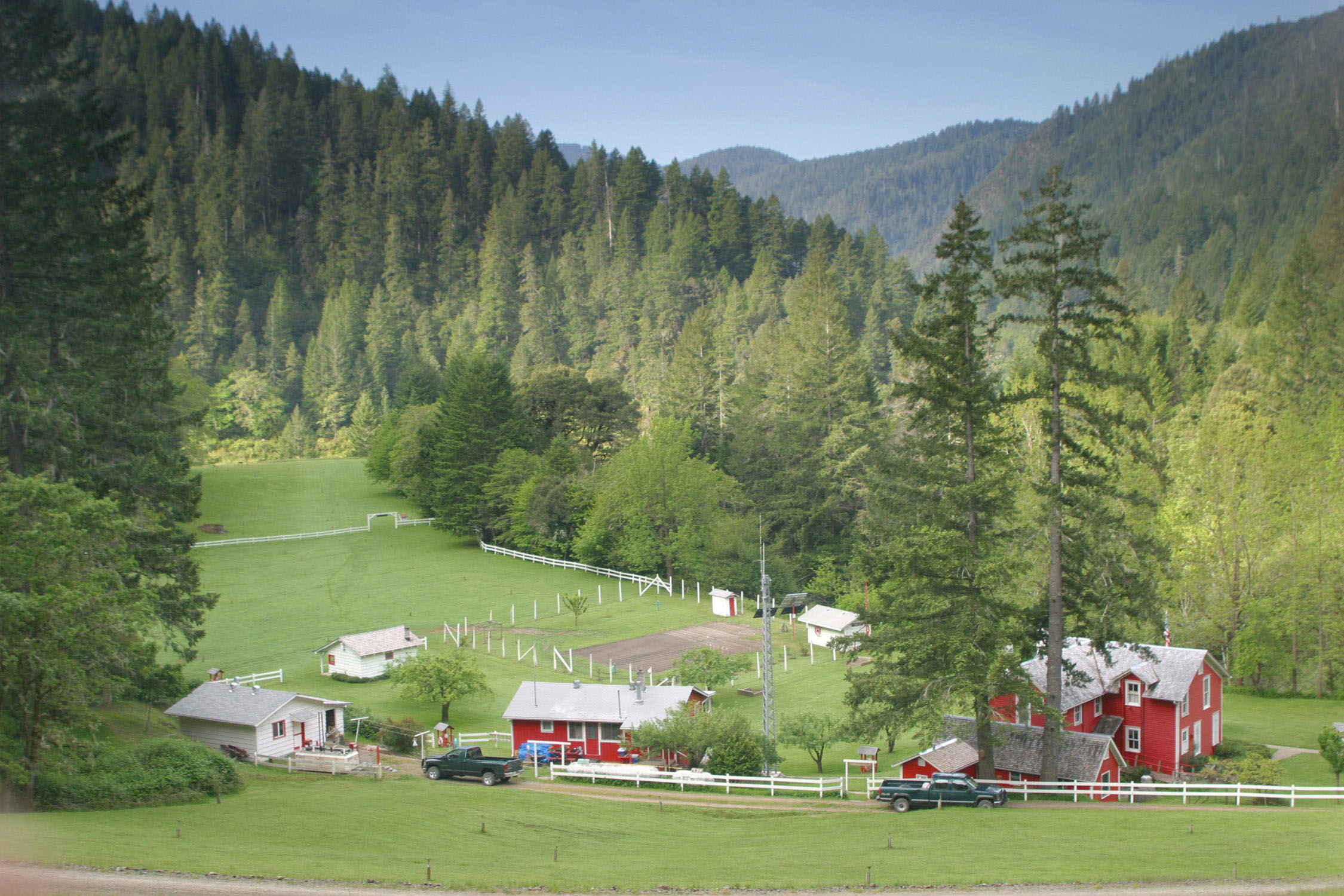
- Rogue River Ranch National Historic Site at Marial

- Location within the state of Oregon Marial (the United States)
- Coordinates: 42°42′44″N 123°53′20″W
- Country: United States
- State: Oregon
- County: Curry
- Elevation: 338 ft (103 m)
- Time zone: UTC-8 (Pacific (PST))
  - Summer (DST): UTC-7 (PDT)
- GNIS feature ID: 1145806

Marial is an unincorporated community and the site of a former post office in Curry County, Oregon, United States. Located along the Rogue River approximately 48 miles (77 km) from its mouth on the Pacific Ocean. The area was home to Takelma Indians, then to white and Karok settlers, before becoming part of a designated wilderness. Buildings preserved at the Rogue River Ranch pioneer farm complex, listed on the National Register of Historic Places, represent the former center of Marial. Nearby are the Tucker Flat Campground and a riverside lodge named Marial.

Marial is in the Klamath Mountains in the Rogue River – Siskiyou National Forest. The nearby Lower Rogue River Trail, a National Recreation Trail, runs roughly parallel to the river between Grave Creek and Illahe through the Wild Rogue Wilderness. The 36-mile (58 km) stretch of the river between Grave Creek and Illahe is designated Wild and Scenic and is "one of the best-known whitewater runs in the United States". Marial is about 23 miles (37 km) downstream of Grave Creek and 13 miles (21 km) upstream of Illahe by water.

== History ==
Marial was the third of three post offices established in the late 19th and early 20th centuries along the canyon of the lower Rogue River. After the Rogue River Wars of 1855–56 and the forced removal of most of the Takelma and other native people who lived along the river, a small number of newcomers began to settle along or near the canyon. These pioneers, some of whom were former gold miners married to Karok Indian women from the Klamath River basin, established gardens and orchards, kept horses, cows, and other livestock, and received occasional shipments of goods sent by pack mule over the mountains. Until the 1890s, the settlers remained relatively isolated from the outside world. In 1883, one of them, Elijah H. Price, proposed a permanent mail route by boat up the Rogue River from Ellensburg (later renamed Gold Beach) to Big Bend, about 35 miles (56 km) upstream. In early 1895 the Post Office Department agreed to a one-year trial of the water route, established a post office at Price's log cabin at Big Bend, and named Price postmaster. Price named the new post office Illahe, a word derived from the Chinook Jargon word ilahekh, meaning "land" or "earth".

In 1897, the department established a post office near the confluence of the Rogue and the Illinois rivers, 8 miles (13 km) downriver from Illahe, at what became Agness. A third Rogue Canyon post office, established in 1903 upriver from Illahe, was named Marial after the first postmaster's daughter, Marial Billings. To avoid difficult rapids, carriers delivered the mail by mule or horse between Illahe and Marial and after 1908 between Agness and both upriver communities. Marial, at river mile (RM) 48 or river kilometer (RK) 77, is about 13 miles (21 km) from Illahe and 21 miles (34 km) from Agness by water. The Marial post office closed in 1954. It was "the last postal facility in the United States to still be served only by mule pack trains". Congress established the Wild Rogue Wilderness in 1978.

== Works cited ==
- Giordano, Pete (2004). Soggy Sneakers: A Paddler's Guide to Oregon's Rivers, fourth edition. Seattle: The Mountaineers Books. ISBN 978-0-89886-815-9.
- McArthur, Lewis A., and McArthur, Lewis L. (2003) Oregon Geographic Names, seventh edition. Portland: Oregon Historical Society Press. ISBN 0-87595-277-1.
- Meier, Gary and Gloria (1995). Whitewater Mailmen: The Story of the Rogue River Mail Boats. Bend, Oregon: Maverick Publications. ISBN 0-89288-216-6.
