= Gates of Hell (disambiguation) =

The Gates of Hell is a sculpture by Auguste Rodin.

Gates of Hell, Gate of Hell or Door to Hell may also refer to:

- Gates of hell, one of various legendary geographic locations
  - Darvaza gas crater, a burning natural gas deposit near Derweze, Turkmenistan
  - Gates of Hell (rapids), rapids through a gorge in eastern Congo
- Gate of Hell (film), a 1953 Japanese samurai film
- Gates of Hell trilogy, a film trilogy by Lucio Fulci
  - City of the Living Dead, the first film in the trilogy alternately released as The Gates of Hell
- The Gates of Hell (1986 novel), a novel by C. J. Cherryh and Janet Morris in the fantasy series Heroes in Hell
- The Gates of Hell (Livingston novel), a 2016 historical fiction/fantasy novel by Michael Livingston

== See also ==
- Hell Gate (disambiguation)
- Hellgate (disambiguation)
- Hells Gate (disambiguation)
