= Hells Gate =

Hells Gate, Hell's Gate, Hell Gate or Hells Gates may refer to:

== Places ==
=== Africa ===
- Hell's Gate National Park, Kenya

=== Antarctica ===
- Hells Gate (Antarctica), Victoria Land
- Hells Gate Moraine, Victoria Land

=== Asia ===
- Nyalam Town, Tibet
- A location in Nampong, Arunachal Pradesh, India
- The Darvaza gas crater, Turkmenistan

=== Australia ===
- A large cattle station near Maude, New South Wales
- Hells Gates (plural), the point where the Burdekin River passes between two hills in Queensland
- A tourist stop on the Savannah Way in Queensland near the NT border
- Hells Gates (plural), the entrance to Macquarie Harbour on the west coast of Tasmania
- A lower section of Davey River in the south west of Tasmania, known as Hells Gates

=== Canada ===
- Hells Gate, British Columbia, a narrow gorge on the Fraser River
- Hell Gate canyon and Hell Gate Rapids on the Liard River in far northern British Columbia
- Hell Gate a gorge at Jones Sound in Nunavut

=== Caribbean ===
- Hell's Gate, Saba, a village on the Caribbean island of Saba
- Hell's Gate Island, in Antigua and Barbuda

=== New Zealand ===
- Tikitere, area of geothermal activity in Rotorua, New Zealand

=== United Kingdom ===
- Walkington Wold, East Yorkshire, England

=== United States ===
- Hells Gate, gap in Cochise County, Arizona
- Hells Gate, gap in Gila County, Arizona
- Hells Gate, gap in Santa Cruz County, Arizona
- Hells Gate, point of interest in Death Valley National Park, California
- Hells Gate, cliff in Eagle County, Colorado
- Hells Gate, channel in Collier County, Florida near Marco Island
- Hells Gate, channel in Camden County, Georgia
- Hells Gate State Park, just outside Lewiston, Idaho
- Hell's Gate, stretch of rapids on the Kettle River in Banning State Park, Minnesota
- Hell Gate, Montana, near the eastern end of the Missoula Valley, Montana
- Hells Gate, gap in Esmeralda County, Nevada
- Hell Gate, New York City, a narrow tidal channel in the East River in New York State
  - Hell Gate Bridge
- Hells Canyon National Recreation Area, Oregon and Idaho, centered on the Snake River, a tributary of the Columbia River
  - Hells Canyon, Snake River, Oregon
- Hells Gate, channel in Curry County, Oregon
- Hellgate Canyon, a gorge and rapids on the Rogue River in Josephine County, Oregon
- Hells Gate, channel in Palo Pinto County, Texas
- Hells Gate, a channel of the Columbia River at the mouth of Hells Gate Canyon, in Klickitat County, Washington

== Books ==
- Hell Gate, a novel by Linda Fairstein
- Hell's Gate, a science fiction novel series by David Weber and Linda Evans
- Hell Gate, a book by Douglas Hensley based on the hauntings of Bobby Mackey's Music World

== Film ==
- Hell's Gate, a 1989 Italian horror film directed by Umberto Lenzi
- Hell's Gate, alternate title for the 1953 Japanese film Gate of Hell.
- Hell's Gate, a human colony on Pandora in the film Avatar (2009 film)

== Media ==
- Hell Gate (website), a New York City news website

== Sports ==
- Gogoplata, a type of wrestling chokehold also known as Hell's Gate

== See also ==
- Gates of Hell (disambiguation)
- Hellgate (disambiguation)
