= Hellgate =

Hellgate could refer to:

- Hellgate: London, a 2007 computer game
- Hellgate (1952 film), an American Western
- Hellgate (1970 film), a Hong Kong film produced by Shaw Brothers Studio
- Hellgate (1989 film), a horror film starring Ron Palillo
- Hellgate (2011 film), a horror film starring Cary Elwes

== Places ==
- Hellgate (Colorado), a mountain pass in Saguache County, Colorado, United States.
- Hellgate (Oregon), a pass in Wasco County, Oregon, United States.

== Sports ==
- Hellgate 100k - a 66.6 miles (107.2 km) ultramarathon in the Blue Ridge Mountains of Virginia.

== See also ==
- Gates of Hell (disambiguation)
- Hell Gate (disambiguation)
- Hells Gate (disambiguation)
