= Illahe, Oregon =

Unincorporated community in the state of Oregon, United States

- Unincorporated community
- Location within the state of Oregon Illahe (the United States)
- Coordinates: 42°37′43″N 124°03′27″W
- Country: United States
- State: Oregon
- County: Curry
- Elevation: 358 ft (109 m)
- Time zone: UTC-8 (Pacific (PST))
  - Summer (DST): UTC-7 (PDT)
- ZIP code: 97406
- Area codes: 458 and 541
- GNIS feature ID: 1143989

Illahe is an unincorporated community and the site of a former post office in Curry County, Oregon, United States. Located along the Rogue River approximately 8 miles (13 km) upriver from Agness, the area was home to Takelma Indians, then to white and Karok settlers, before becoming part of a designated wilderness. The area has a riverside lodge and a nearby campground, both named Illahe.

Illahe is located in the Klamath Mountains in the Rogue River – Siskiyou National Forest. The Lower Rogue River Trail, a National Recreation Trail runs roughly parallel to the river between Grave Creek and Illahe through the Wild Rogue Wilderness. The 36-mile (58 km) stretch of the river between these two points is designated Wild and Scenic and is "one of the best-known whitewater runs in the United States".

== Climate ==
Illahe has a warm-summer Mediterranean climate (Csb) according to the Köppen climate classification system.

Climate data for Illahe
| Month | Jan | Feb | Mar | Apr | May | Jun | Jul | Aug | Sep | Oct | Nov | Dec | Year |
|---|---|---|---|---|---|---|---|---|---|---|---|---|---|
| Record high °F (°C) | 67 (19) | 76 (24) | 83 (28) | 94 (34) | 99 (37) | 111 (44) | 112 (44) | 110 (43) | 111 (44) | 99 (37) | 75 (24) | 68 (20) | 112 (44) |
| Mean daily maximum °F (°C) | 48.9 (9.4) | 53.8 (12.1) | 59.1 (15.1) | 65.3 (18.5) | 72.1 (22.3) | 79.4 (26.3) | 88 (31) | 88.2 (31.2) | 83.7 (28.7) | 68.4 (20.2) | 54.8 (12.7) | 49.2 (9.6) | 67.6 (19.8) |
| Mean daily minimum °F (°C) | 36 (2) | 37.4 (3.0) | 38.2 (3.4) | 40.1 (4.5) | 44 (7) | 48.6 (9.2) | 52.1 (11.2) | 51.8 (11.0) | 48.7 (9.3) | 44.1 (6.7) | 40.2 (4.6) | 36.8 (2.7) | 43.2 (6.2) |
| Record low °F (°C) | 14 (−10) | 13 (−11) | 25 (−4) | 28 (−2) | 29 (−2) | 36 (2) | 37 (3) | 32 (0) | 31 (−1) | 23 (−5) | 17 (−8) | 6 (−14) | 6 (−14) |
| Average precipitation inches (mm) | 14.36 (365) | 11.32 (288) | 9.98 (253) | 4.91 (125) | 3.2 (81) | 1.28 (33) | 0.29 (7.4) | 0.71 (18) | 1.89 (48) | 6.21 (158) | 12.83 (326) | 14.93 (379) | 81.9 (2,080) |
| Average snowfall inches (cm) | 5.1 (13) | 2.6 (6.6) | 1.1 (2.8) | 0.2 (0.51) | 0 (0) | 0 (0) | 0 (0) | 0 (0) | 0 (0) | 0 (0) | 0.2 (0.51) | 1.5 (3.8) | 10.7 (27) |
| Average precipitation days | 17 | 15 | 16 | 11 | 8 | 5 | 1 | 2 | 4 | 9 | 14 | 17 | 119 |

== History ==
Illahe was the first of three post offices established in the late 19th and early 20th centuries along the canyon of the lower Rogue River between Marial and Agness. After the Rogue River Wars of 1855–56 and the forced removal of most of the Takelma and other native people who lived along the river, a small number of newcomers began to settle along or near the canyon. These pioneers, some of whom were former gold miners married to Karok Indian women from the Klamath River basin, established gardens and orchards, kept horses, cows, and other livestock, and received occasional shipments of goods sent by pack mule over the mountains. Until the 1890s, the settlers remained relatively isolated from the outside world. In 1883, one of them, Elijah H. Price, proposed a permanent mail route by boat up the Rogue River from Ellensburg (later renamed Gold Beach) to Big Bend, about 35 miles (56 km) upstream. The route, Price told the government, would serve perhaps 11 families and no towns. Although the Post Office Department resisted the idea for many years, in early 1895 it agreed to a one-year trial of the water route, established a post office at Price's log cabin at Big Bend, and named Price postmaster. Price's job, for which he received no pay during the trial year, included running the post office and making sure that the mail boat made one round-trip a week. He named the new post office Illahe. The name derives from the Chinook Jargon word ilahekh or iliʼi, meaning "land", "earth" or "country".

In 1897, the department established a post office near the confluence of the Rogue and the Illinois rivers, 8 miles (13 km) downriver from Illahe, at what became Agness. A third post office, established in 1903 about 20 miles (32 km) upriver from Illahe, was named Marial. To avoid difficult rapids, carriers delivered the mail by mule or horse between Illahe and Marial, and after 1908 most mail traveling beyond Agness went to both upriver communities by pack animal. The Illahe post office closed in 1943. Congress established the Wild Rogue Wilderness in 1978.

== Works cited ==
- Giordano, Pete (2004). Soggy Sneakers: A Paddler's Guide to Oregon's Rivers, fourth edition. Seattle: The Mountaineers Books. ISBN 978-0-89886-815-9.
- McArthur, Lewis A., and McArthur, Lewis L. (2003) Oregon Geographic Names, seventh edition. Portland: Oregon Historical Society Press. ISBN 0-87595-277-1.
- Meier, Gary and Gloria (1995). Whitewater Mailmen: The Story of the Rogue River Mail Boats. Bend, Oregon: Maverick Publications. ISBN 0-89288-216-6.
