= Whisky Creek Cabin =

Historic house in Oregon, United States

- U.S. National Register of Historic Places
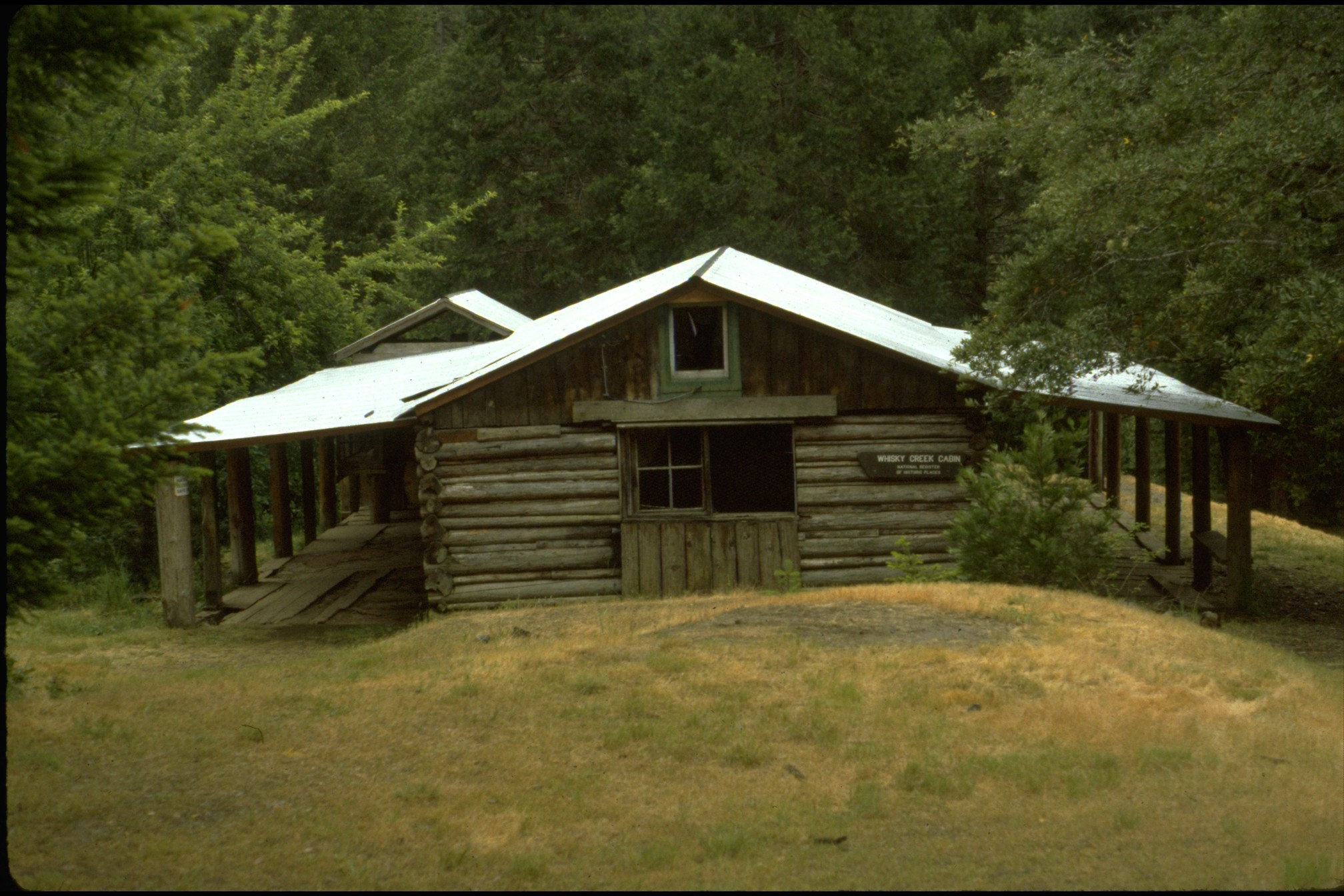
- Location: Rogue River-Siskiyou National Forest
- Nearest city: Wolf Creek, Oregon
- Coordinates: 42.66028°N 123.63361°W
- Built: ca. 1880
- Architectural style: Rustic log cabin
- NRHP reference No.: 75001584
- Added to NRHP: 1975

The Whisky Creek Cabin is a rustic log cabin located in southwest Oregon along the section of the Rogue River that is designated as a National Wild and Scenic River. It is the oldest remaining mining cabin in the Rogue River canyon. The Bureau of Land Management purchased the cabin and surrounding property in 1973. The Whisky Creek Cabin is listed on the National Register of Historic Places in 1975.

== History ==
The Whisky Creek Cabin was built in about 1880 by an unknown miner. The original structure was very basic, consisting of four walls, a dirt floor, and wooden shake roof. A flume ditch was constructed near the cabin around 1890 to provide water for hydraulic mining on Whisky Creek. The flume begins about one half mile up the stream from the cabin and ends at the gully behind the tool shed. In 1905, the flume was extended to a point about 50 feet (15 m) above Whisky Creek bar. This flume ditch also provided drinking water for the cabin.

The first recorded mining claim on Whisky Creek was filed by P.H Rushmore in 1917. Rushmore sold his claim to Cy Whiteneck a year later. Whiteneck lived at Whisky Creek for the next 30 years. During that time, he improved the original cabin by laying a wooden floor and adding a second room. He also constructed several work sheds near the cabin. Over the years, Whiteneck used hydraulic mining methods to extract gold from the creek, but never got rich.

In 1948, Whiteneck sold his claim to L. M. Nichols and his wife. In 1957, Nichols hired Lou Martin to be the property's caretaker. Martin continued to mine Whisky Creek during the sixteen years he lived there. He also improved the site. Martin built a solar-heated shower adjacent to one of the sheds and added a large walk-in pantry next to the cabin. Martin also constructed a cable car to haul firewood across the creek. To accomplish that, he strung half-inch steel cable 480 feet (150 m) across the creek, and tightened it with a system of hand-winches and pulleys. Martin remained the on-site caretaker until 1973 when the property was sold to the Bureau of Land Management.

In 1973, Bureau of Land Management installed interpretive signs at the site and opened the cabin to the public for self-guided tours. Because of cabin's unique heritage as the oldest surviving mining cabin in the Rogue River Canyon, the Whisky Creek Cabin was listed on the National Register of Historic Places on 5 September 1975. The historic area cover 20 acres (81,000 m^{2}) and includes the cabin and one additional contributing structure.

== Structure ==
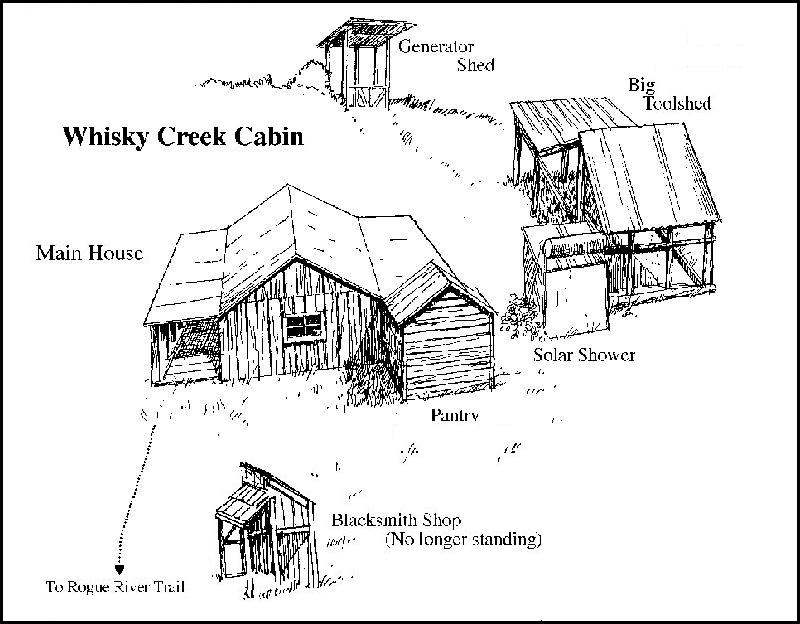
Map of the Whisky Creek Cabin historic site

Because of its isolated location, the cabin has changed very little since its last resident left in 1973. It is a one-story log cabin with two rooms and an adjacent pantry. The cabin has two long porches that run the length of the building in the front and back. The porches are held up by log posts. The cabin's floor is made of fir planking, and the roof is corrugated sheet-metal. The pantry has a double-wall with sawdust insulation in between the inner and outer walls.

There are two sheds on the site. There is a large tool shed just behind the cabin. A power generator shed is located a short distance north of the cabin. There is a unique solar-heated shower, built by the cabin's last resident, located between the tool shed and the cabin.

== Access ==
The Whisky Creek Cabin historic site is located in the Rogue River canyon in southern Oregon. The cabin's elevation is approximately 640 feet (200 m) above sea level. It is an isolated site within the Rogue National Wild and Scenic River corridor, surrounded by the Rogue River-Siskiyou National Forest.

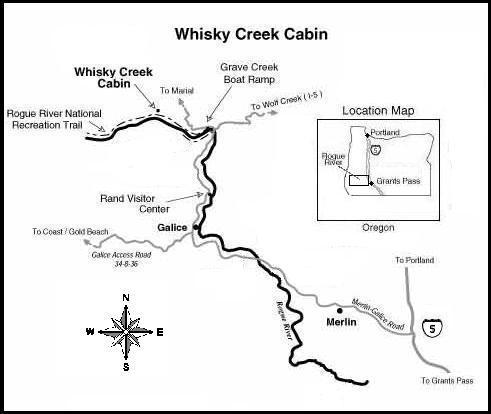
Historic Whisky Creek Cabin on the Rogue River

To get to the Whisky Creek Cabin from Interstate 5 take the Merlin exit north of Grants Pass, Oregon and follow the Merlin-Galice Road 23 miles (37 km) west through the towns of Merlin and Galice past the historic Rand Ranger Station to Grave Creek, where the wild and scenic section of the Rogue River begins. The Grave Creek trailhead is 4 miles (6.4 km) past the ranger station.

The Whisky Creek Cabin can only be reached by floating down the Rogue River or by hiking the Rogue River canyon trail. From the trailhead at Grave Creek, it is a three-mile (5 km) hike to the cabin along the Rogue River National Recreation Trail. The cabin is approximately one quarter mile up Whisky Creek from its mouth on the north side of the Rogue River. Information on the river trail is available at the Smullin Visitor Center at the Rand Ranger Station. There is also a boat ramp at Grave Creek. Rogue River float permits can be obtained at the Rand visitor center as well.

Whisky Creek Cabin is a popular stop for both hikers and boaters. There is a primitive campground located at the mouth of Whisky Creek. There are public restrooms at the campground. Water is available from Whisky Creek; however, some form of water purification is recommended before drinking. Leave no trace procedures apply while camping and cooking along the Wild and Scenic River corridor. Fire pans are also required within 400 feet (120 m) of the river.
