= Sardine Creek =

Stream in Oregon, U.S.

Coordinates: 42°26′06″N 123°04′50″W

Sardine Creek is a stream in the U.S. state of Oregon. Rogue River.

Sardine Creek most likely was so named after sardines, a foodstuff of prospectors. Sardine Creek historical past can only start 1853, after a long chase starting atop Table rock Mountain down the backside north-west Along the River that the native American called Gold River, later to be given Rogue River chased through the area that was not yet called Gold Hill
