= Gates of Hell (rapids) =

Series of rapids on the Lualaba River in the Democratic Republic of Congo

- Portes d'Enfer
- Location within Democratic Republic of the Congo
- Location: Downstream of Kongolo, Tanganyika Province, DR Congo
- Coordinates: 5.2467°S 26.97297°E
- Type: Rapids in a gorge
- Total width: 50–100 metres (160–330 ft)
- Watercourse: Lualaba River

The Gates of Hell is a narrow gorge on the Lualaba River, the upper course of the Congo River, downstream of Kongolo, Tanganyika, Democratic Republic of the Congo. The gorge ends the navigable reach of the upper Lualaba and has been deemed "impassable to navigation".

== Geography ==
The gorge is less than 100 metres (330 ft) wide. Below it, five groups of rapids follow one another over about 125 kilometres (78 mi) toward Kasongo. In the early 1900s they were referred to as Hinde Falls (Chutes Hinde). The water of the former inland lake basin of the Kamalondo, in the Upemba Depression, drains through the gorge into the middle Congo.

== History ==
In 1894, Sidney Langford Hinde and Richard Mohun recorded a description of the gorge during their exploration of Congo Free State. Their group surveyed the stretch of the Lualaba between Nyangwe and the mouth of the Lukuga River. Mohun gave the gorge its name.

In 1909, Prince Albert of Belgium described the gorge in his journal as "a narrowing of the river between a few low rocks", which he likened to a lock.

== Transport ==
The gorge was impassable to river traffic, so the Compagnie du chemin de fer du Congo supérieur aux Grands Lacs africains (CFL) built a railway around it. The rail line from Kindu to Kongolo was built between 1906 and 1910. It linked the navigable river below the rapids to the navigable reach that runs south into Katanga.

== Hydroelectric project ==
A "Gates of Hell Hydroelectric Plant" was proposed for the site—a build–operate–transfer public–private partnership, with an estimated cost of US$742 million and transmission lines of 12 kilometres (7.5 mi) to Kongolo and 75 kilometres (47 mi) to Kabalo.
