= Wild Rogue Wilderness =

Wilderness area in Oregon, United States

- IUCN category Ib (wilderness area)
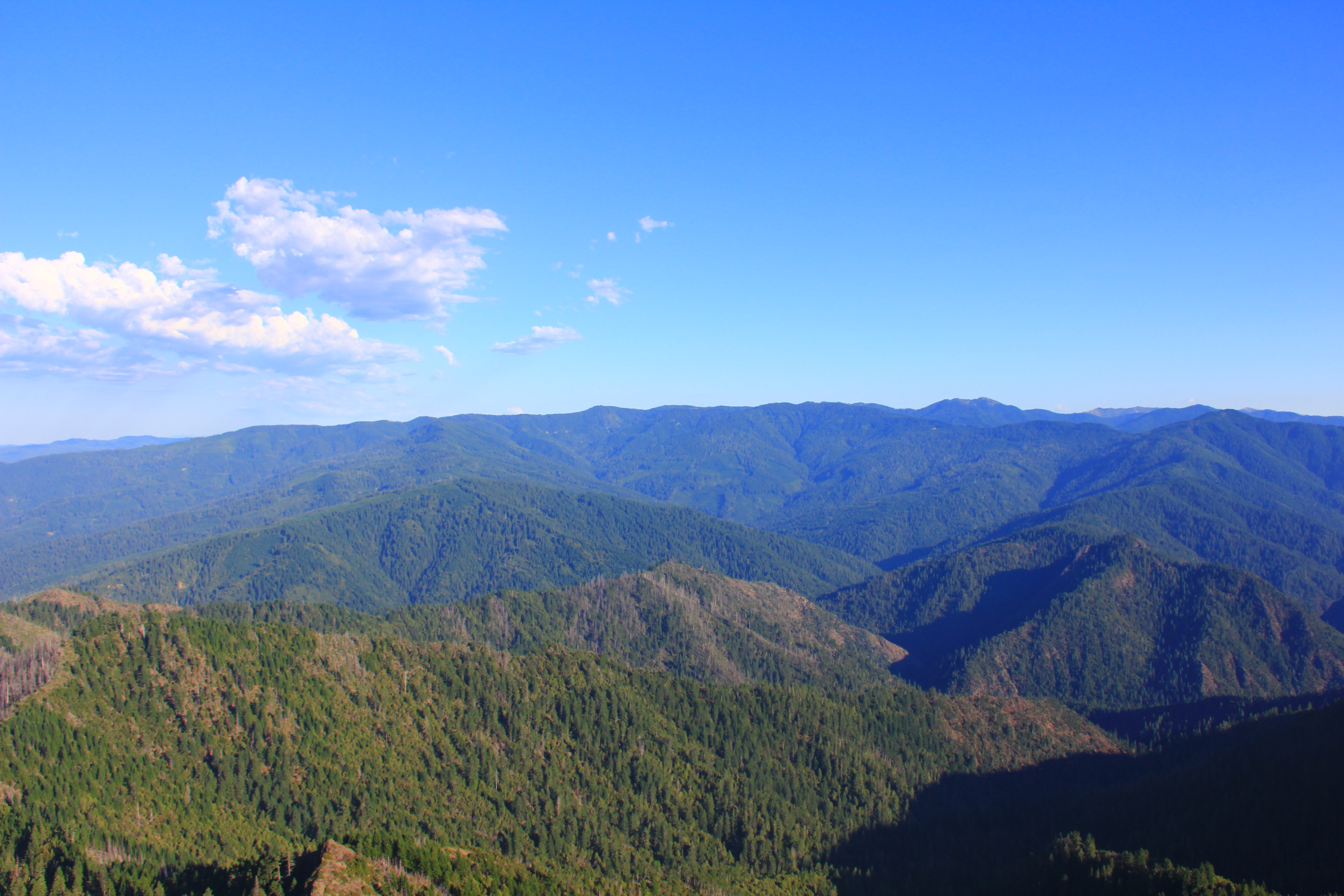
- Interactive map of Wild Rogue Wilderness
- Location: Curry / Coos counties, Oregon, United States
- Nearest city: Gold Beach, Oregon
- Coordinates: 42°36′14″N 124°02′34″W
- Area: 35,818 acres (14,495 ha)
- Established: 1978
- Governing body: United States Forest Service and Bureau of Land Management

The Wild Rogue Wilderness is a wilderness area surrounding the 84-mile (135 km) Wild and Scenic portion of the Rogue River in southwestern Oregon, U.S. to protect the watershed. The wilderness was established in 1978 and now comprises 35,818 acres (14,495 ha). Because it spans part of the Rogue River-Siskiyou National Forest and the Medford district of the Bureau of Land Management (BLM), the Wild Rogue Wilderness is administered by both the BLM and the Forest Service.

== History ==
The lure of gold in the 1850s attracted many miners, hunters, and stocker raisers. Conflicts between white settlers and Native Americans culminated in the Rogue River Wars of 1855–56. After their defeat, Native Americans were taken to reservations. Mining remnants such as pipe, flumes, trestles, and stamp mills can still be found in the wilderness.

=== Expansion ===
Environmental groups are advocating for a 58,000-acre (23,000 ha) expansion of the wilderness to spare old-growth forest from potential logging initiated by the BLM, as well as an addition of 93 miles (150 km) of streams to the Wild and Scenic Rivers System. The proposal has been introduced multiple times in the U.S. Congress by Oregon's elected officials.

== Management ==
The Wild Rogue Wilderness is unusual in that the management of the Wild and Scenic River permits motorboat operation and lodge construction for accommodation. This would not normally be allowed in a designated wilderness area.

== Biology ==
Otters and salmon, including steelhead, inhabit the Rogue River within the wilderness, and black bears, ospreys, and great blue herons feed on the fish. Lizards, ticks, and rattlesnakes can be found in grassy areas above the river.

== Recreation ==
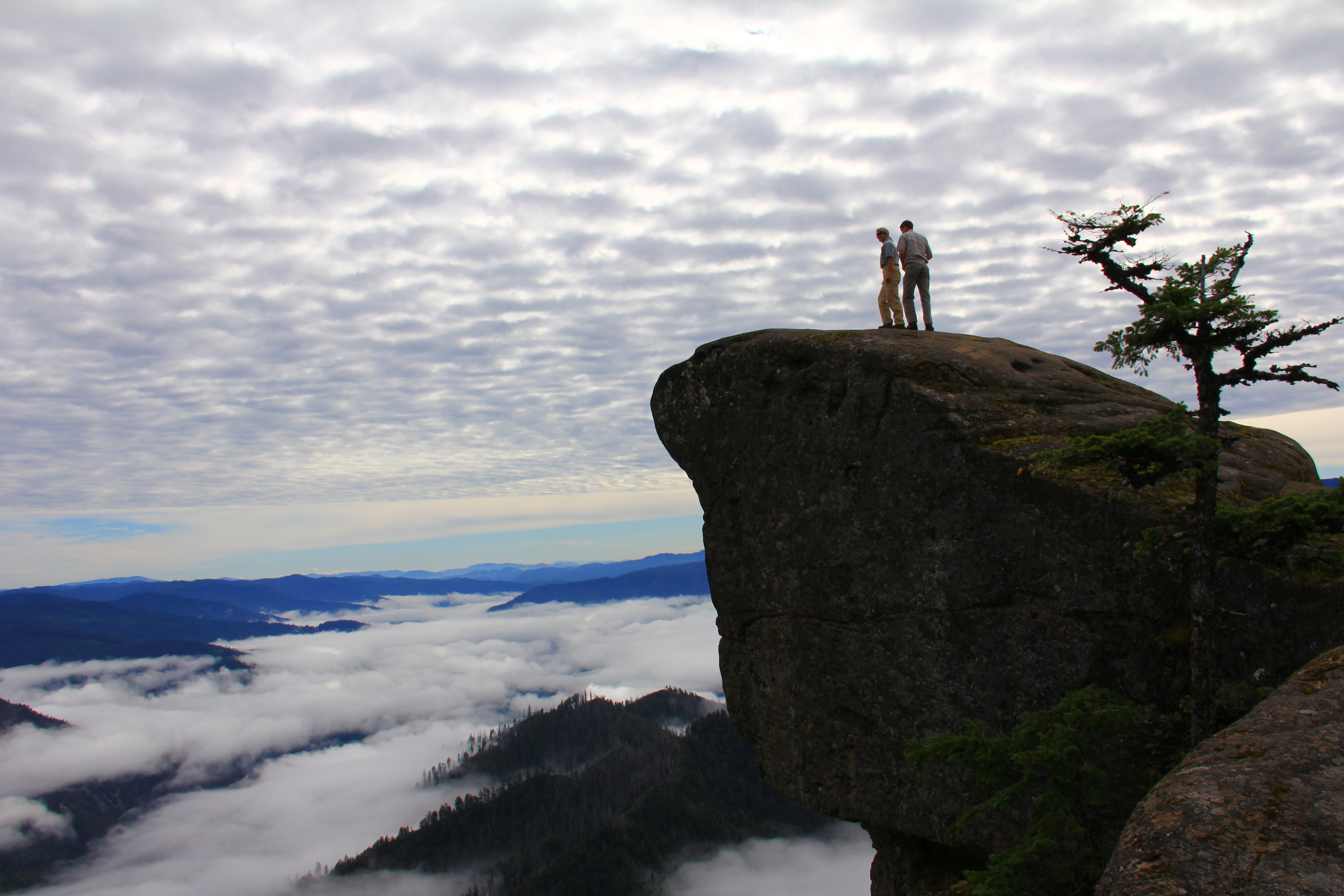
Hanging Rock in the Wild Rogue Wilderness

Popular recreation activities in the Wild Rogue Wilderness include hiking, camping, rock climbing, fishing, and whitewater rafting. The Rogue River is one of the most popular whitewater runs in the world because of a steady water level due to upstream dams, sunny summer weather, and scenic forests and steep canyons.

There are several hiking trails in the Wild Rogue, including the Rogue River National Recreation Trail, the Panther Ridge Trail along the northern border of the wilderness, and the Mule Creek Trail on the BLM portion of the wilderness. The Blossom fire of 2005 destroyed some of the hiking trails, which were still closed at the end of 2007.

== See also ==
- List of Oregon Wildernesses
- Wilderness Act
