= Rand Ranger Station =

- U.S. National Register of Historic Places
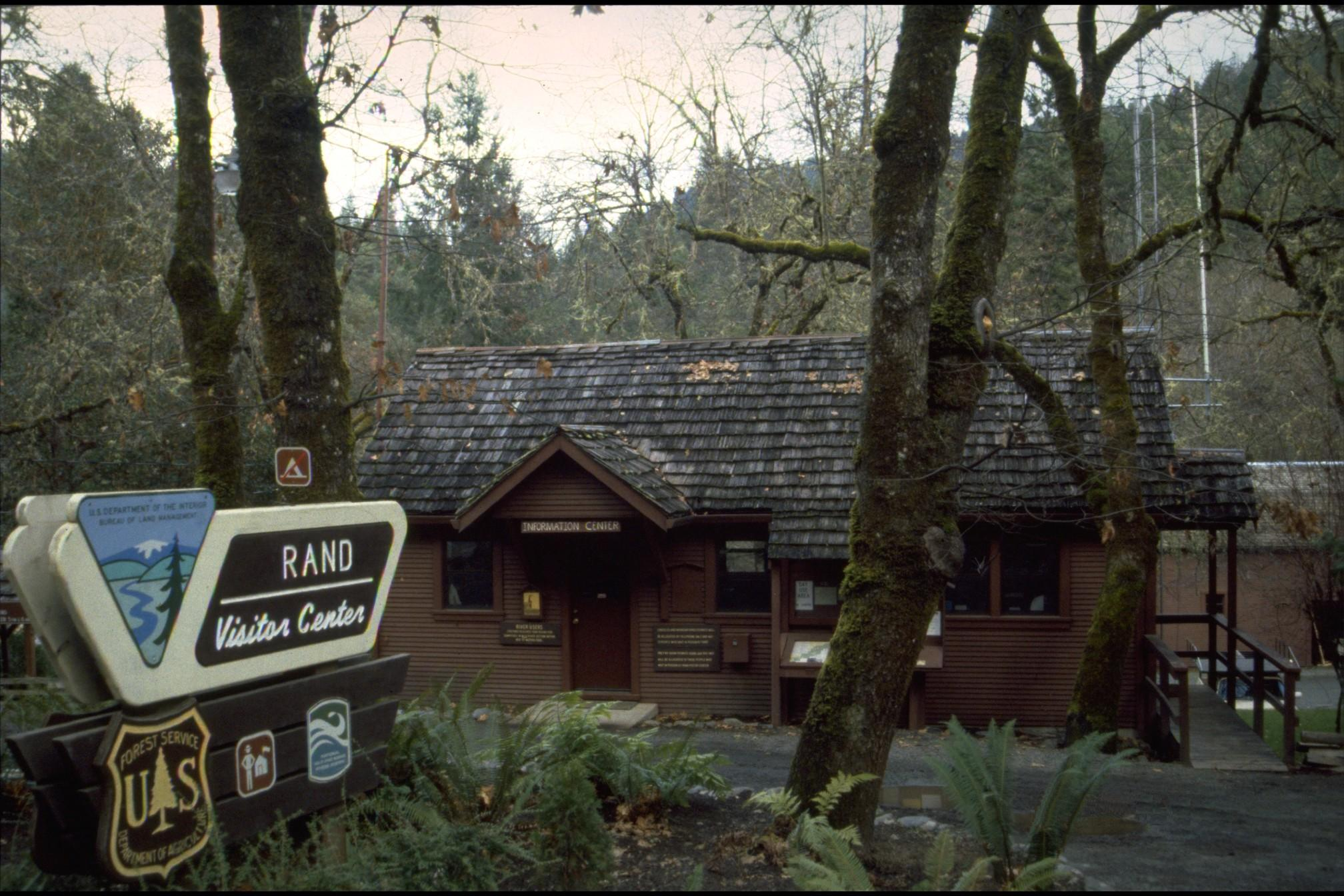
- Rand Visitor Center
- Location: Rogue River-Siskiyou National Forest
- Nearest city: Grants Pass, Oregon, USA
- Coordinates: 42.59765°N 123.58455°W
- Built: 1931 -1936
- Architectural style: Oregon rustic
- NRHP reference No.: 99000703
- Added to NRHP: 1999

The Rand Ranger Station is a Bureau of Land Management compound consisting of eight historic buildings located in the Rogue River-Siskiyou National Forest in southwest Oregon. It was built by the United States Forest Service and the Civilian Conservation Corps as a district ranger station for the Galice Ranger District. The ranger station property was transferred to the Bureau of Land Management in 1970. Today, the ranger station office serves as a visitor center. The Rand Ranger Station is listed on the National Register of Historic Places.

== History ==
President Theodore Roosevelt created the Siskiyou National Forest in 1906. In 1909, six ranger districts were established to manage specific areas within the National Forest. The Galice Ranger District was responsible for Forest Service lands in the Rogue River canyon including timber sales, trail construction, and fire suppression activities. Jesse P. Dewitt became the first district ranger. Because the Forest Service had trouble securing permission to build a ranger's residence at the Rand site (which was owned by a local mining company), Dewitt was forced to live in a tent for eight years, from 1909 until 1916. In 1916, the mining company finally agreed to rent a small parcel of land to the Forest Service for one dollar per year. Construction on the ranger's residence, district office, and a barn began in 1917. In 1932, the Rand mining claim expired, and the Forest Service took permanent control of the ranger station property.

The Civilian Conservation Corps was created in 1933. That same year, a Civilian Conservation Corps camp was established at Rand. Known as Camp 1650, it was initially staffed by 18 enrollees. While most of the Rand area projects were managed by the Forest Service, the Civilian Conservation Corps workers constructed buildings, built roads and trails, and developed campgrounds in the surrounding National Forest. The Civilian Conservation Corps troops also helped Forest Service employees fight wildfires during the summer months.

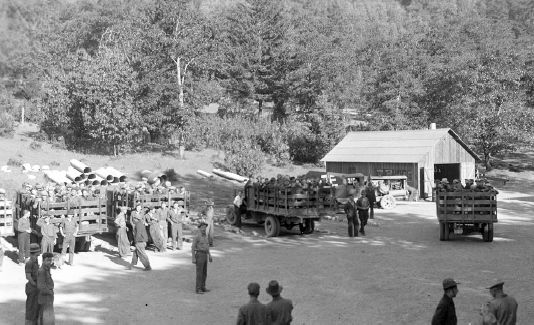
Civilian Conservation Corps crews at Rand in 1935

The Civilian Conservation Corps built their own barracks and camp support structures adjacent to the Rand Ranger Station. The Civilian Conservation Corps camp eventually housed over 200 enrollees. They also made many improvements to the Forest Service side of the compound. This included remodeling existing buildings and constructing new structures. They improved the landscaping around ranger station and built masonry retaining walls at the site. The Civilian Conservation Corps camp at Rand was closed in August 1941.

Following World War II, the Rand Ranger Station continued as the headquarters for Forest Service operations in the Rogue River canyon. During the postwar period, the Rogue River became a very popular area for fishing, hiking, camping, and boating. In 1958, the Forest Service added a new ranger residence and a bunkhouse for seasonal employees. In 1963, the Siskiyou National Forest closed the Rand Ranger Station and moved the Galice Ranger District headquarters to Grants Pass. The Rand complex was left unused except for several buildings that were leased by Oregon Board of Forestry and Bureau of Public Roads.

In 1970, the Bureau of Land Management acquired the Rand property from the Forest Service. Since then, the Bureau of Land Management has uses the site to issue float permits for the Rogue River, which is officially designated as a National Wild and Scenic River. In 1996, the Bureau of Land Management's visitor center that occupies the old ranger station office was named the Smullin Visitor Center in honor of William B. Smullin, a well known radio and television executive from southern Oregon.

While all of the buildings from Civilian Conservation Corps camp are now gone, the Forest Service structures built by Civilian Conservation Corps still exist and are in good condition. In fact, the Rand Ranger Station has changed very little since it was built; as a result, it provides visitors a glimpse into the past. Because of the rustic architecture of its buildings and the site's unique historic value as an early Forest Service ranger station, the 95-acre (380,000 m^{2}) Rand compound was listed on the National Register of Historic Places on 10 June 1999.

== Structures ==
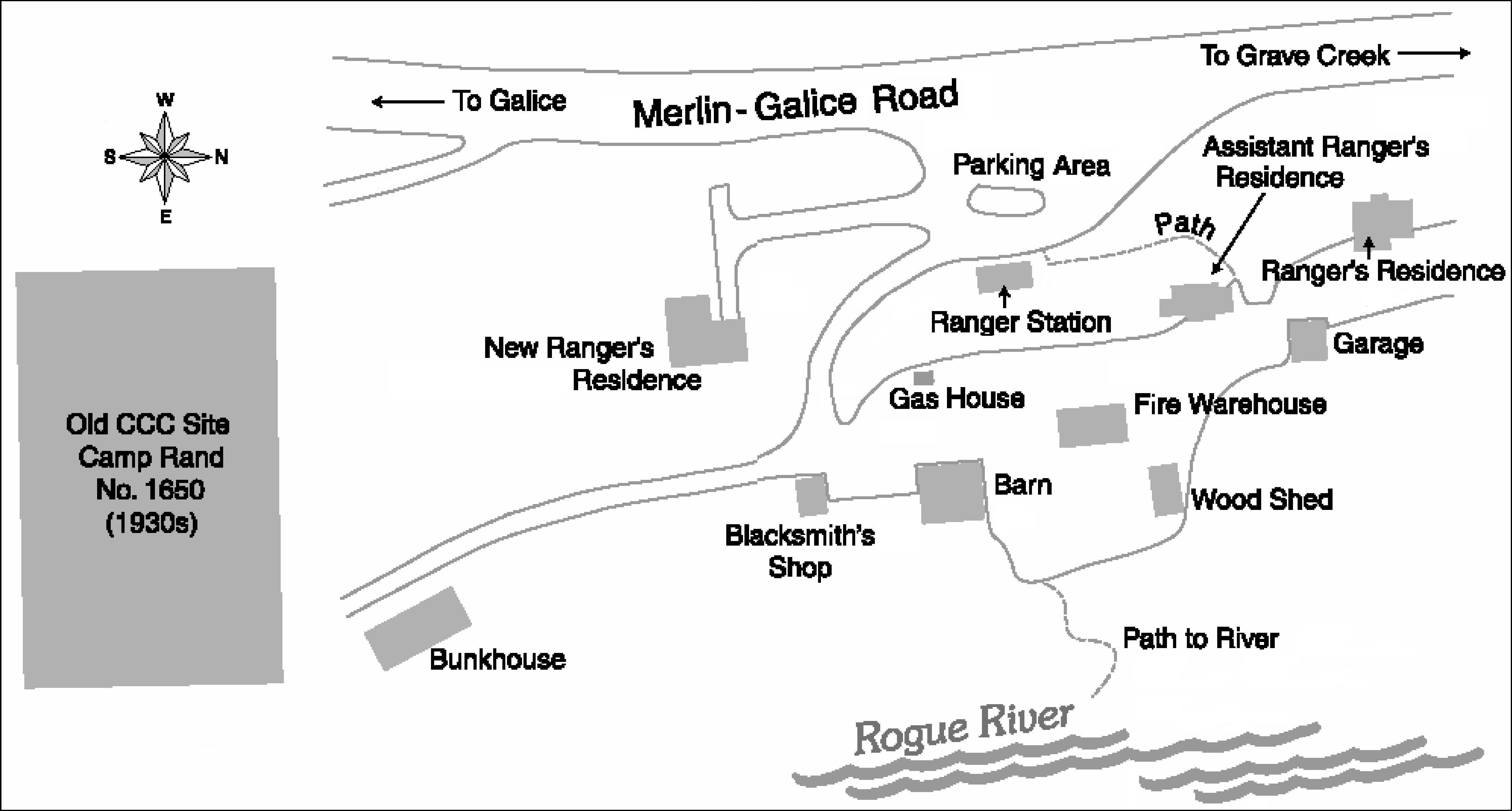
Site map of the historic Rand Ranger Station next to the Rogue River

The Rand Ranger Station compound is made up of eight historic buildings plus one additional historic structure. The buildings are all basic wood-frame structures. They include the district office, two ranger residences, a fire equipment warehouse, blacksmith shop, horse barn, gas house, a garage, and a large woodshed. All the historic structures at the Rand Ranger Station were either built or improved by Civilian Conservation Corps workers under the supervision of Forest Service rangers.

The Rand historic structures were built in the Oregon rustic style between 1931 and 1936. The assistant ranger's residence was built by the Forest Service in 1931. The ranger station garage was built in 1933. The range station office and the ranger's residence were both begun in 1933 and completed in 1934. The barn, blacksmith shop, and gas house were built 1934. The fire warehouse was constructed in 1935, and the woodshed was built in 1936.

The Rand Ranger Station office is now a visitor center. In 2004, the Bureau of Land Management expanded the visitor center, adding 900-square-foot (84 m^{2}) of floor space to the building.

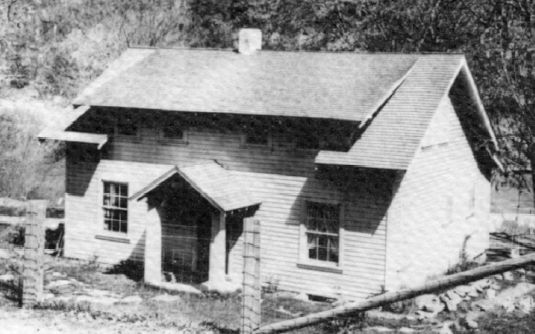
*Ranger's residence

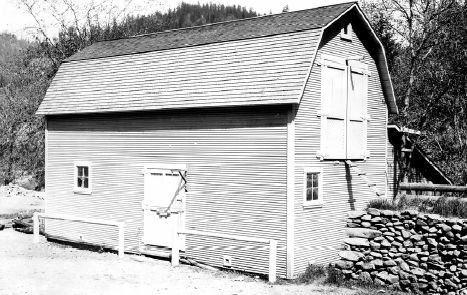
*Ranger station barn

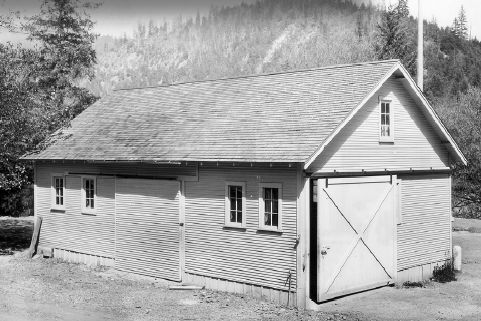
*Fire warehouse

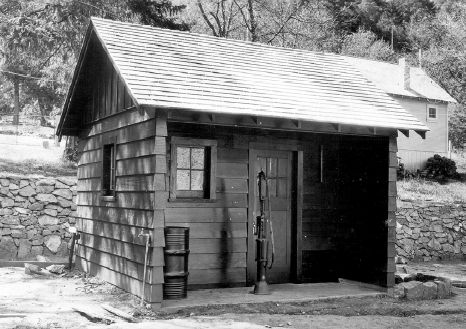
*Gas and oil house

In addition to the historic structure at the Rand Ranger Station, there are two non-historic buildings located on the compound. The two non-contributing building are a third ranger residence and a crew bunkhouse, both built in 1958.

== Location ==
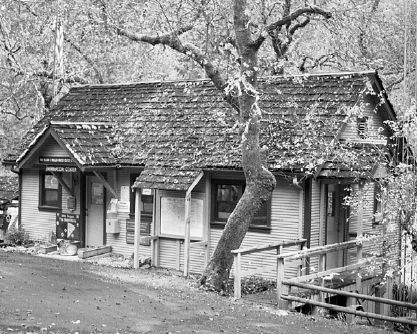
William B. Smullin Visitor Center at Rand, 2004

The Rand Ranger Station is in the Rogue River-Siskiyou National Forest west of the Cascade Mountains in southern Oregon. It is located approximately three miles north of the small unincorporated community of Galice, Oregon. The ranger station is on a terraced slope above the Rogue River at an elevation of approximately 735 feet (224 m) above sea level.

To get to the Rand Ranger Station from Interstate 5, take the Merlin exit north of Grants Pass, Oregon, and follow the Merlin-Galice Road 19 miles (31 km) west through the towns of Merlin and Galice. The Rand Ranger Station is located on the east side of the Merlin-Galice Road on the west bank of the Rogue River. Parking is available at the Smullin Visitor Center at the entrance to the compound.

The Smullin Visitor Center is open to the public during normal business hours every day from mid-May to mid-October. Office hours vary the rest of the year, so the Bureau of Land Management recommends that visitors call ahead during the off season. Visitors are welcome to take self-guided walking tours around the historic ranger station compound. However, the Smullin Visitor Center is the only building that is open to the public. Visitor must obtain permission from a Bureau of Land Management employee to enter the other historic buildings.
