= Agness, Oregon =

Unincorporated community in the state of Oregon, United States

- Unincorporated community
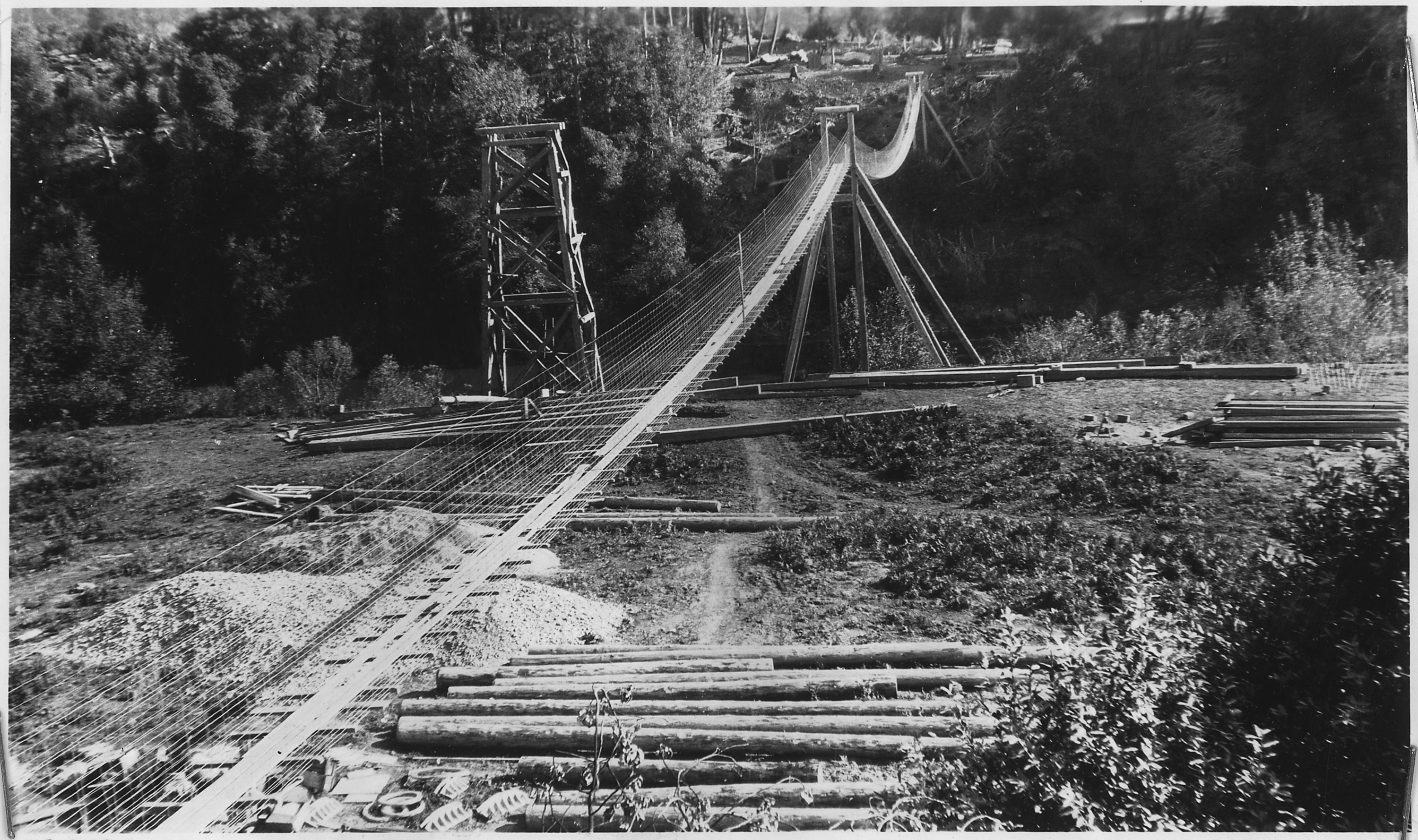
- A footbridge at Agness over the Rogue River, circa 1927

- Location within the state of Oregon Agness (the United States)
- Coordinates: 42°33′23″N 124°04′08″W
- Country: United States
- State: Oregon
- County: Curry
- Elevation: 207 ft (63 m)
- Time zone: UTC-8 (Pacific (PST))
  - Summer (DST): UTC-7 (PDT)
- ZIP codes: 97406
- Area codes: 541, 458
- GNIS feature ID: 1137035

Agness is an unincorporated community in Curry County, Oregon, United States. It is near the confluence of two Wild and Scenic rivers—the Lower Rogue and the Illinois. Agness post office was established October 16, 1897. It was named after Agnes, the daughter of the first postmaster, and subsequently misspelled. The Agness area is popular for fishing and hiking. Agness is in the Rogue River–Siskiyou National Forest and was threatened by the Biscuit Fire in 2002.

Agness is served by one of only two rural mail boat routes still operating in the U.S. The other is along the Snake River in eastern Oregon. The mail boat runs on the Rogue River between Gold Beach and Agness.

Rogue River Ranch, east of Agness, is on the National Register of Historic Places, and it and Lucas Lodge in Agness are in the Oregon State Historic Preservation Office historic sites database. The Agness-Illahe Museum is open from May through September.

Much of Agness's economy is based on tourism, with several lodges, hotels, restaurants, and camping sites scattered throughout the community. Many cater to the large jet boats from Jerry's Rogue Jets which carry up to 50 passengers from Gold Beach to various locations in the Rogue Valley. Such stops include the historic Lucas Lodge, Singing Springs Resort, Cougar Lane Restaurant, and Agness RV Park.

== Climate ==
This region experiences warm (but not hot) and dry summers, with no average monthly temperatures above 71.6 °F (22.0 °C). According to the Köppen Climate Classification system, Agness has a warm-summer Mediterranean climate, abbreviated "Csb" on climate maps.

Climate data for Agness, Oregon
Month	Jan	Feb	Mar	Apr	May	Jun	Jul	Aug	Sep	Oct	Nov	Dec	Year
Record high °F (°C)	67 (19)	76 (24)	86 (30)	94 (34)	99 (37)	111 (44)	112 (44)	109 (43)	111 (44)	99 (37)	75 (24)	67 (19)	112 (44)
Mean daily maximum °F (°C)	50.1 (10.1)	54.3 (12.4)	59.2 (15.1)	64.3 (17.9)	71.3 (21.8)	78.2 (25.7)	86.3 (30.2)	87.2 (30.7)	82.5 (28.1)	69.4 (20.8)	54.5 (12.5)	48.4 (9.1)	67.1 (19.5)
Mean daily minimum °F (°C)	36.3 (2.4)	36.6 (2.6)	38.3 (3.5)	39.9 (4.4)	44.5 (6.9)	49.2 (9.6)	52.9 (11.6)	52.3 (11.3)	47.7 (8.7)	42.8 (6.0)	39.3 (4.1)	35.4 (1.9)	42.3 (5.7)
Record low °F (°C)	14 (−10)	13 (−11)	20 (−7)	28 (−2)	29 (−2)	34 (1)	37 (3)	32 (0)	31 (−1)	23 (−5)	17 (−8)	6 (−14)	6 (−14)
Average precipitation inches (mm)	12.94 (329)	11.32 (288)	10.06 (256)	5.53 (140)	3.34 (85)	1.31 (33)	0.30 (7.6)	0.80 (20)	2.19 (56)	5.14 (131)	12.51 (318)	13.21 (336)	78.65 (1,998)
Average snowfall inches (cm)	0.8 (2.0)	1.1 (2.8)	0.5 (1.3)	0.1 (0.25)	0 (0)	0 (0)	0 (0)	0 (0)	0 (0)	0 (0)	0.1 (0.25)	0.8 (2.0)	3.4 (8.6)

== Education ==
Agness is within the Central Curry School District, which operates two schools: Riley Creek Elementary School and Gold Beach High School. The entire county is in the Southwestern Oregon Community College district.

Agness formerly had a kindergarten–sixth grade (K–6) "one-room school", which actually consists of two rooms. It was kept open by the Central Curry district because of its "geographical remoteness": approximately 30 miles (48 km) from Gold Beach up a "winding and sometimes dangerous" road. In 1969 the school had six students. The road (County Road 595/USFS Arterial Route 33) is a continuation of Bear Camp Road, which has been the site of several incidents that have resulted in the deaths of travelers.

From circa 1947, and into 1997, Agnes School's enrollment was around six. In 1997 the community promoted a bill in the Oregon Legislature, House Bill 2340 which would make it so small schools like Agness would not be affected by school mergers required by the state. In 2003 the school had a teacher and one aide, along with four students. Secondary students attended schools in Gold Beach, including Riley Creek School (for middle school), and Gold Beach High (the only high school in the district.

The Agness Community Library is in the former school building.
