= Rogue River Ranch =

- U.S. National Register of Historic Places
- U.S. Historic district
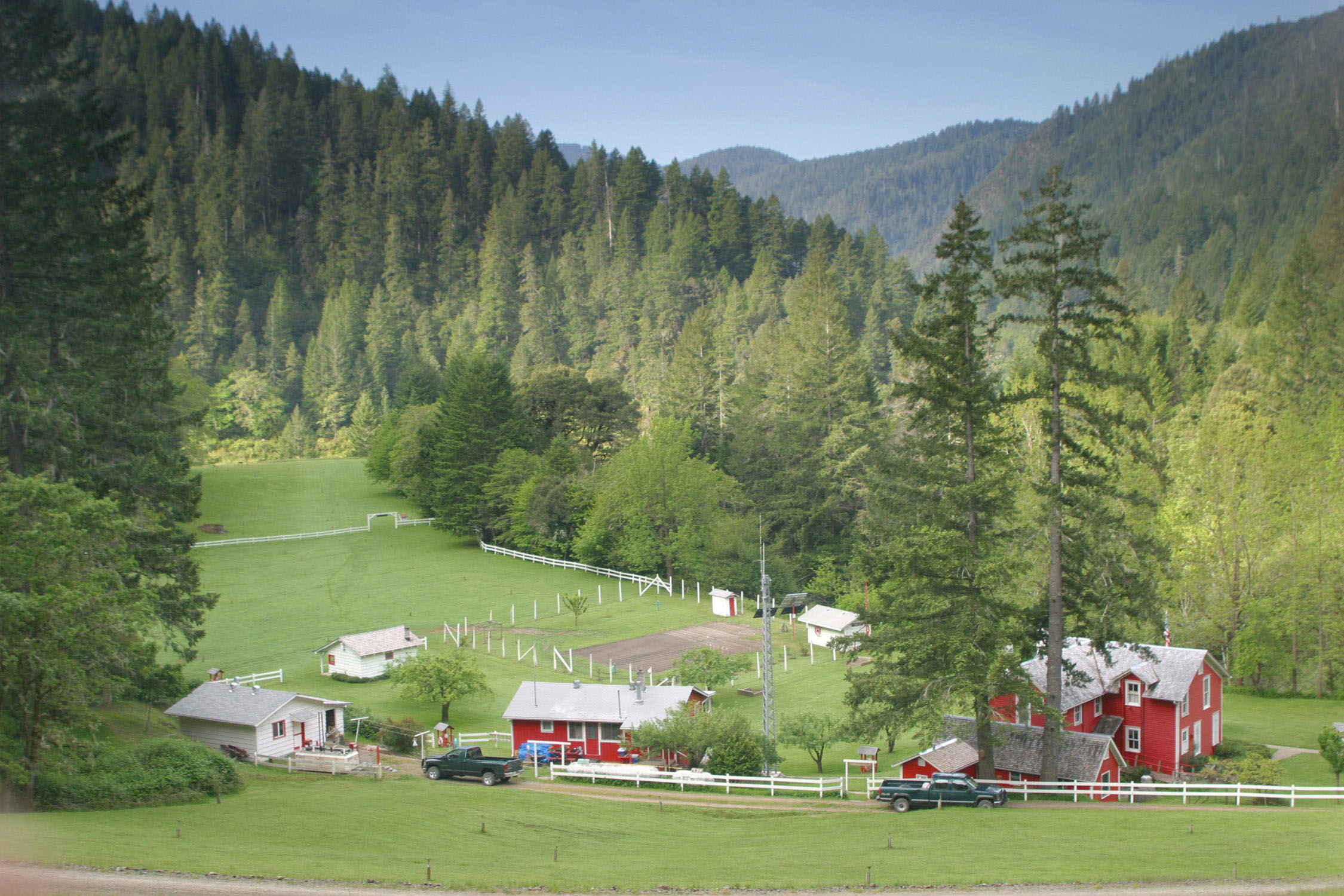
- Rogue River Ranch National Historic Site

- Location within Oregon Location within the United States
- Location: Curry County, Oregon, USA
- Nearest city: Agness, Oregon
- Coordinates: 42.71864°N 123.88154°W
- Built: 1903–1930s
- Architect: George Billings
- Architectural style: Common wood frame
- NRHP reference No.: 75001581
- Added to NRHP: 1975

The Rogue River Ranch is a pioneer farm complex in Curry County in southwest Oregon, United States. The ranch is located on the north shore of the Rogue River just outside the Rogue River-Siskiyou National Forest. The original ranch buildings were constructed by George Billings. Later, the ranch was sold to Stanley Anderson, who increased the size of the property and built additional farm buildings. The Bureau of Land Management bought the ranch in 1970. Today, the main ranch house is a museum. The Bureau of Land Management also maintains a campground on the property. The Rogue River Ranch is listed on the National Register of Historic Places.

== History ==
Archeological evidence shows that Native Americans occupied the area around the Rogue River Ranch for over 9,000 years. Ancient Takelma speaking people were the first to make their home in Rogue River valley. Later, Athabascan speaking people migrated into the area. While their languages were different, both groups shared a common way of life based on fishing, hunting, and gathering. For thousands of years, the site that is now the Rogue River Ranch was a seasonal camp. However, it appears likely a permanent village was eventually established at the site. The Native American way of life along the Rogue River came to an end in 1856 when the native people were removed to reservations in northern Oregon.

In 1887, Tom Billings filed an official homestead claim on the north shore of the Rogue River at the mouth of Mule Creek. The following year, Tom transferred the claim to his older brother, George. In 1894, Tom and his wife, Anna, had their first child, a daughter named Marial. The settlement at Mule Creek was named Marial, after her.

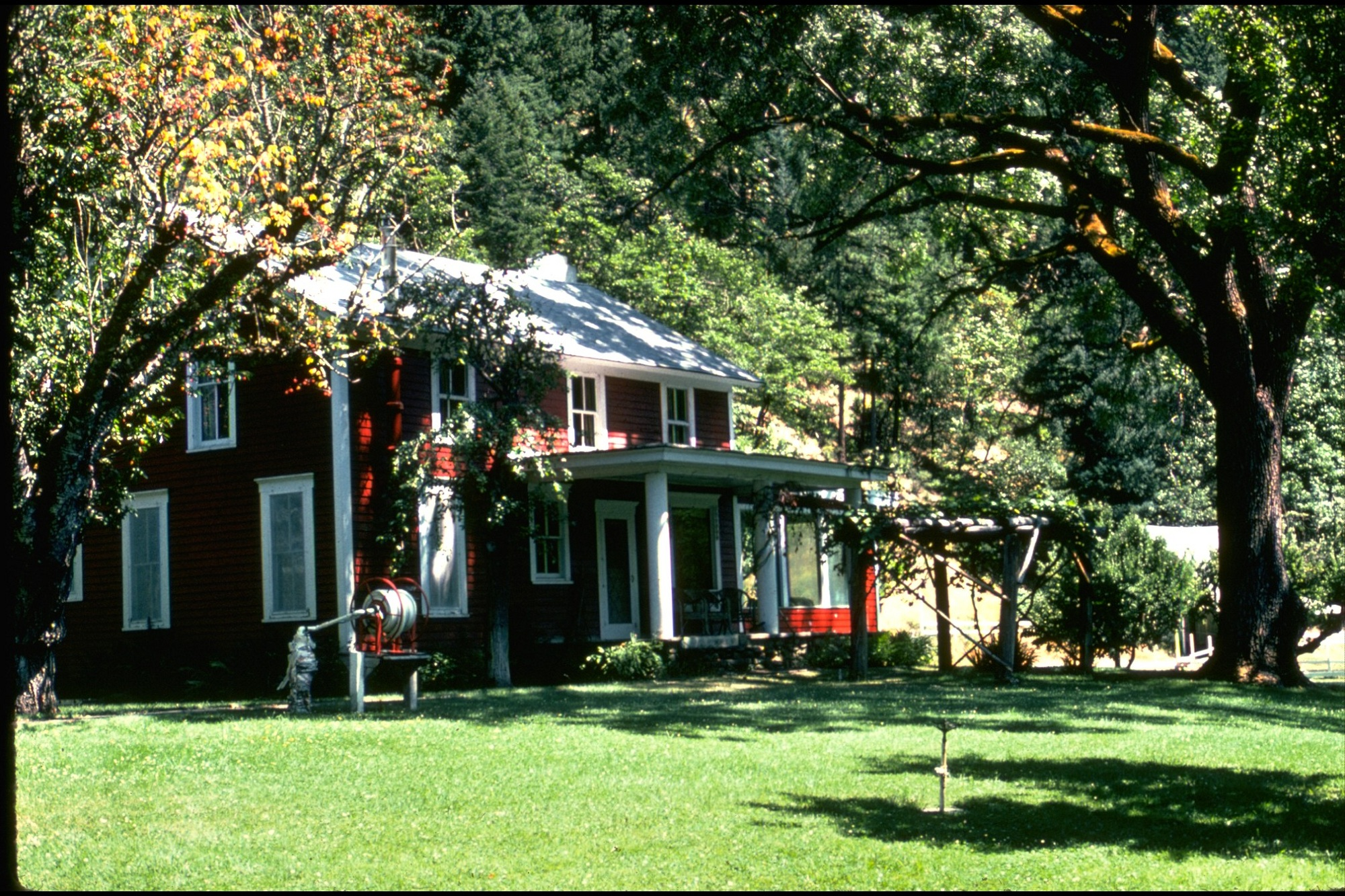
Front view of the Rogue River Ranch main house

In 1903, George Billings constructed a large two-story house and established the Billings Trading Company at Marial. Billings also ran a boarding house for travelers and local miners. Over time, the trading post became the center of commercial and social life for residents of Marial, who eventually number around 100 people. In 1907, Billings sold his property on the west side of Mule Creek, an area called Douglas Bar, to the Red River Mining and Milling Company. The next year, Billings built a barn on his remaining property. The building eventually became known as the tabernacle. Billings hosted dances and church services in the tabernacle. The Red River Mining Company closed in 1912, and Billings re-acquired the property on the west side of the creek. In 1931, Billings sold his 70-acre (280,000 m^{2}) ranch to Stanley Anderson for $5,000.

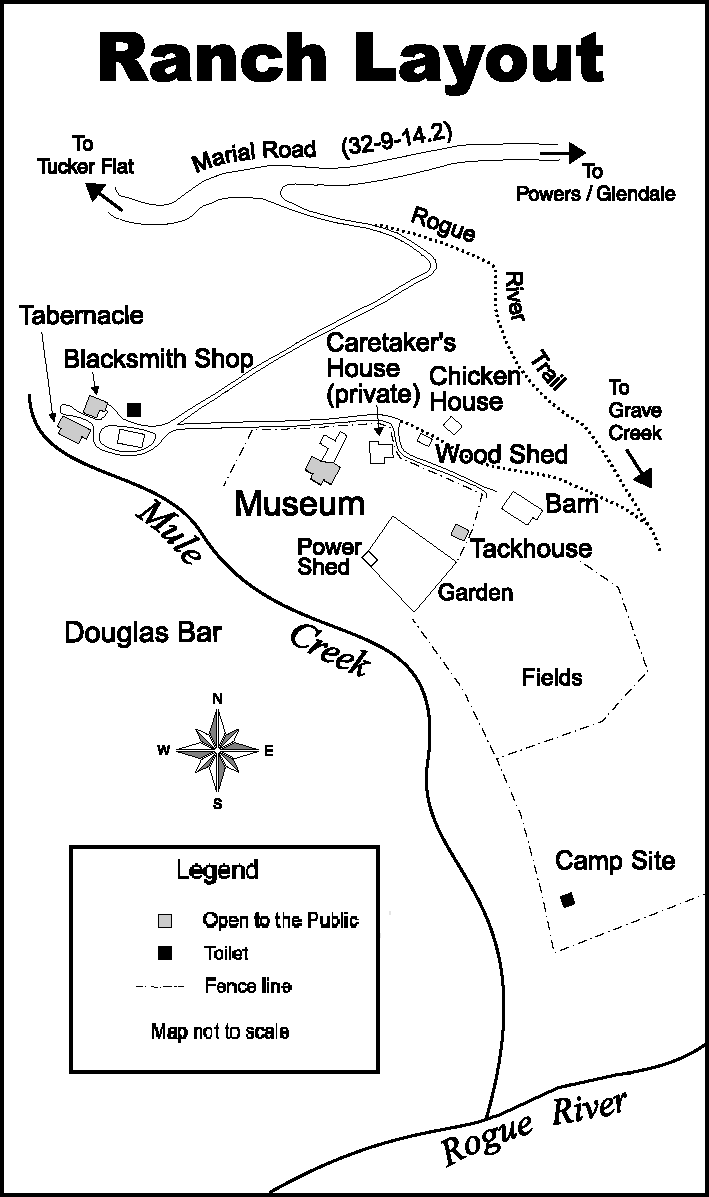
Site map of the historic Rogue River Ranch

The Anderson family later purchased 130 acres (0.53 km^{2}) across the river from the ranch. In the years following the purchase of the ranch, the Anderson family expanded the main house and built a caretaker's house, bunkhouse, blacksmith shop, tackhouse, woodshed, storage shed, and chicken coop. The Andersons also tore down most of the old mining buildings at Douglas Bar. The Marial post office, which had been open since in 1903, was closed in 1954. In 1956, Anderson painted the main house a distinctive red, a color it still retains. In 1970, the Anderson family sold their 200-acre (0.81 km^{2}) ranch to the United States Government under the National Wild and Scenic Rivers program, and the Bureau of Land Management was given responsibility for managing the property.

The Bureau of Land Management established the Rogue River Ranch National Historic Site and converted the main house into a museum. The museum has displays on Native American history, the local mining era, the Billings homestead period, and the development of the Anderson family farm. The Rogue River Ranch museum is open to visits from May to October.

The Rogue River Ranch offers visitors the opportunity to experience the rich heritage of the Rogue River canyon area. Because the ranch played an important role in the commercial and social development of the local area, the Rogue River Ranch was listed on the National Register of Historic Places on 29 December 1975. This historic ranch covers 700 acres (2.8 km^{2}). There are four historic buildings on the property and six non-contributing structures.

== Structures ==
There are four ranch buildings open to the public. They are the tackhouse, the blacksmith shop, the tabernacle, and the main house museum. There is also a caretaker's house, a large barn, and several minor farm buildings that are not open to the public.

The main house was built in 1903. It sits on a gentle slope facing Mule Creek. The house is a two-story, wood-frame structure. The lumber for the house was all cut by hand from Ponderosa pine logs cut on the site. The siding was smoothed with hand planes down to one quarter inch in thickness. The window glass was shipped overland from Portland, but the window frames were handmade at the ranch. The main house does not have a fireplace. It is heated by a wood-burning stove in the living room.

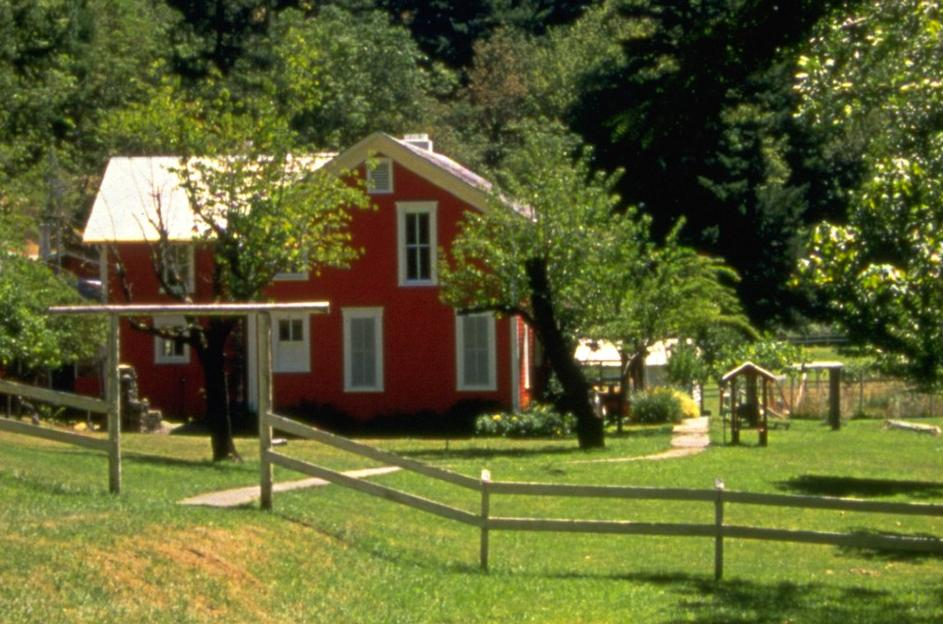
* Historic main house

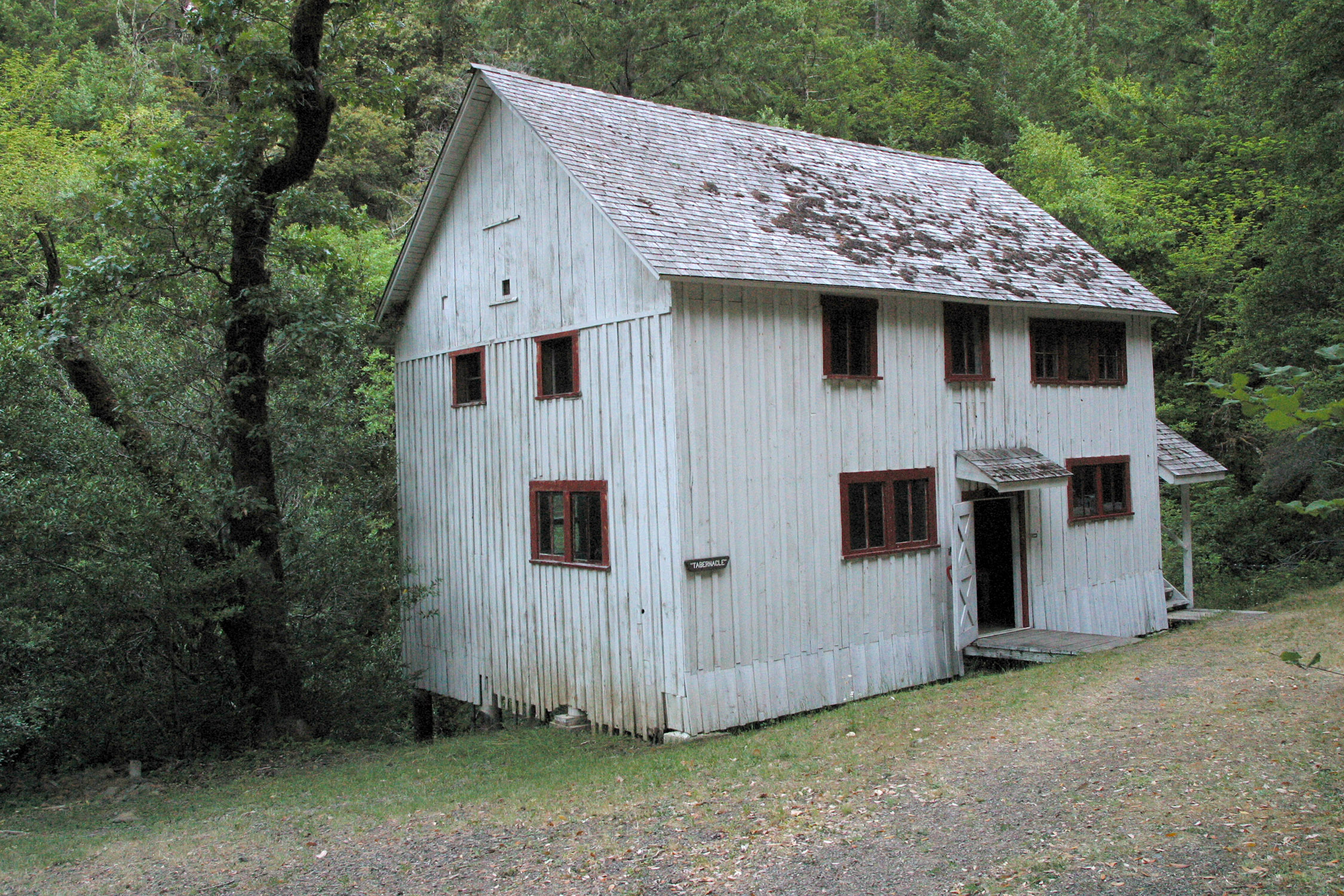
* Tabernacle building

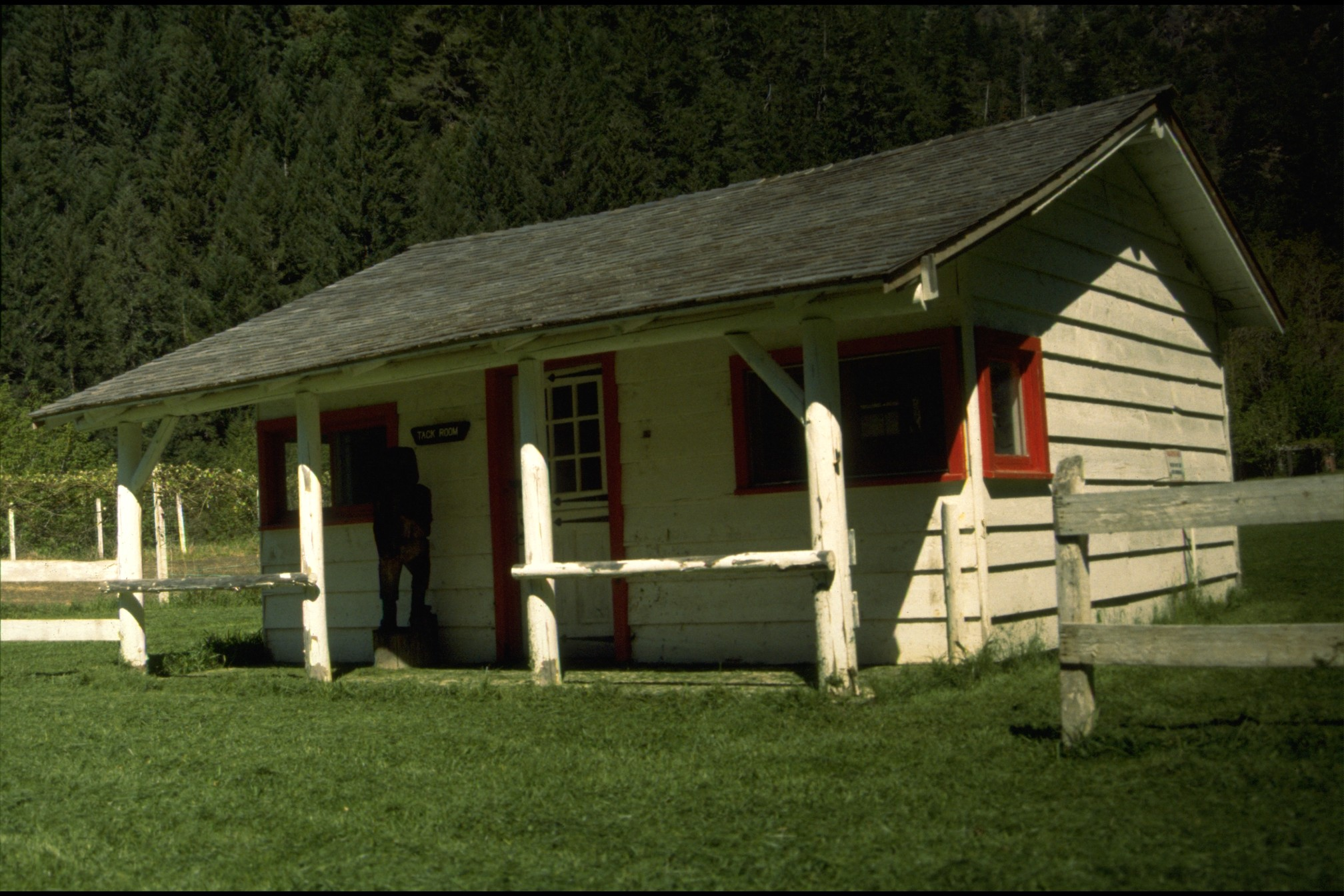
* Ranch tackhouse

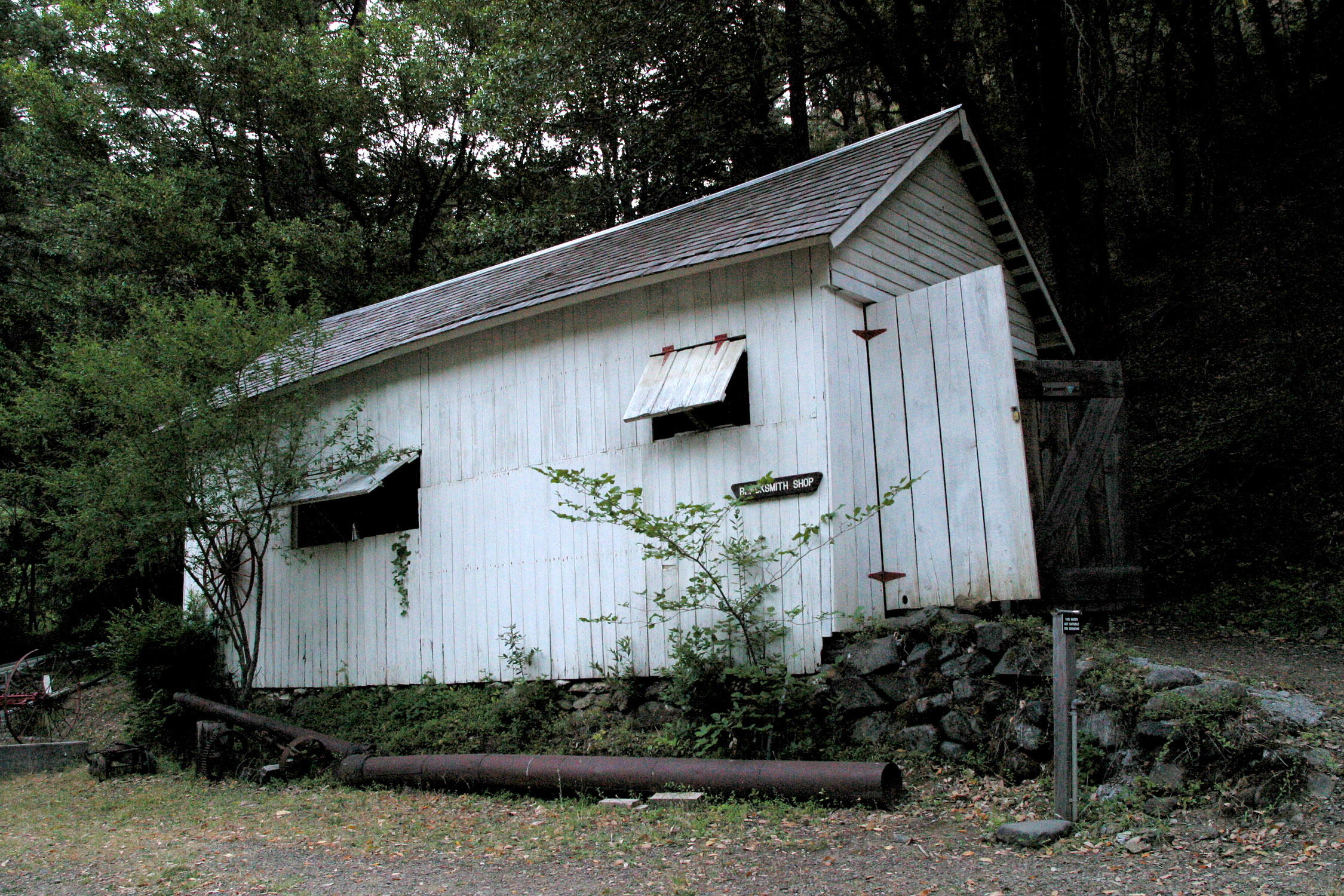
* Blacksmith shop

The other ranch buildings are also wood-frame structures with wood-lap siding. The Bureau of Land Management renovated the Tackhouse in 2008. The project replaced badly rotted framing members that had made the entire structure unsound.

== Location ==
Rogue River Ranch National Historic Site is located in the Rogue River canyon in southern Oregon. The ranch is at the mouth of Mule Creek on the north shore of the Rogue River at an elevation of approximately 420 feet (130 m) above sea level. It is an isolated property, surrounded by the Rogue River-Siskiyou National Forest. The ranch is a major stop over point along the wild section of the Rogue River, which has been officially designated a National Wild and Scenic River.

The Rogue River Ranch is 45 miles (72 km) northwest of Galice, 42 miles (68 km) southwest of Glendale, 24 miles (39 km) southeast of Powers, and 23 miles (37 km) northeast of the small unincorporated community of Agness. It takes at least two hours to reach the ranch from any of these starting points. There are no gas stations along the route, so visitors driving to the ranch should depart with a full tank of gas. The nearest city is Grants Pass, which is 75 miles (121 km) from the ranch by way of Galice or Glendale.

The ranch can also be reached by boating down the Rogue River or by hiking the Rogue River canyon trail. The ranch is 22 river miles from Grave Creek Bridge (which is 8 miles (13 km) north of Galice), or 23-mile (37 km) along the canyon trail. Most people make the float trip in two days. The canyon hike from Grave Creek usually takes three days.

Because the Rogue River Ranch is a popular stopping point for boater floating down the Rogue River and hikers trekking the Rogue River canyon trail, the Bureau of Land Management maintains a campground at the mouth of Mule Creek. The campground has several primitive camp sites with public toilets available nearby. Due to new regulations for public water supplies, drinking water is no longer available near the caretaker's house. The Bureau of Land Management does not charge a fee for camping at the ranch; however, campers must coordinate their stay with the ranch caretaker.
