= Mary Peters (1852–1921) =

Ferry operator

Mary "Indian Mary" Peters
- Born: c. 1852; Josephine County, Oregon, U.S.
- Died: 1921
- Occupation: ferry operator
- Children: 5 (13 according to 1910 census)

Mary Peters (c. 1852–1921) was an Umpqua woman who operated a ferry across the Rogue River. She owned land what was known as the smallest Indian reservation in the United States.

== Life ==
Peter's was the daughter of Umpqua Joe, and were both members of the Grave Creek band of the Umpqua people who was known for warning settlers and miners in the Grants Pass area of an impending attack from local Indians in 1855. The Grave Creek band of the Umpqua people, was a small Takelma-related group whose population declined rapidly during the early 1850s. Numbering only around 40–50 people, the band was nearly destroyed during settler expansion and militia violence associated with the Rogue River Wars. By 1856, only a few dozen survivors remained, many of whom were forcibly removed to coastal reservations. Umpqua Joe also ran a ferry that transported miners and supplies which was very important to the Southern Oregon region.

== How she got the land ==
Peter's father was reportedly allowed to stay on his land after the end of the Rogue River Wars rather than be removed due to helping settlers. He died on November 13, 1886.

After his death, Mary Peters, applied for a claim for the land under the Dawes Act, also known as the "Indian Homestead Act. "She was popularly known as "Indian Mary" – not to be confused with a different Native American woman also living in Oregon during the same period (Kalliah Tumulth, a Watlala Chinook) and also known as "Indian Mary." Eight years later, she received a little more than 72 acres. Her 25-year land deed has often been described as the smallest Indian reservation in the United States.

She continued to operate her father's ferry business after his death. In 1894 she leased the ferry to William Massie and moved with her two surviving daughters to Grants Pass. She moved to Salem, Oregon in 1920 to be near her daughters Rosetta Farlow and Lillian Fairfield.

She died in 1921 and was buried at City View Cemetery in Salem, Oregon.

== Indian Mary Park ==
^{Peter's property changed hands several times and was purchased by Josephine County in 1958 to be converted into what is now known as Indian Mary Park.} ^{Indian Mary Park is located near the Rogue River's Hellgate Canyon and provides camping, fishing access, and river recreation facilities, and is part of a network of recreational and historical sites along the Merlin–Galice corridor of the Rogue River.}

== Legacy ==
In being granted the land under the Dawes Act, she owned a reservation which was rare at the time for Native Americans and women.

However, Peter's land ownership took place during a time in Oregon where women were beginning to be able to own land. The 1850 Donation Land Claim Act allowed married women to claim land in their own names. However, only “white settlers” and “American half-breed Indians” could claim land, and the Act excluded all non-U.S. citizens, including Native peoples, Blacks, and Hawaiians. The 1878 Married Women's Property Act, passed by Oregon lawmakers allowed married women in Oregon to own their own property and enter business arrangements without their husband. There is no mention of Native women being able to own land during this time making Mary a special circumstance.

== See also ==
- Confederated Tribes of Siletz Indians
- Historic ferries in Oregon
