= Constants Creek =

Stream in Oregon, United States

Coordinates: 42.48401°N 122.86143°W

Constants Creek is a stream in the U.S. state of Oregon. It is a tributary to the Rogue River.

Constants Creek was named after Isaac Constant (1809–1890), a pioneer settler in the Rogue Valley. The creek ran through the Constant's donation land claim. The name has for several decades has been erroneously documented as "Constance Creek" due to phonetic similarity by persons unaware of the original name.

There were no settlers in the Rogue River Valley prior to New Year's Day, 1851. In the spring of 1851 a man by the name of Evans constructed a ferry across Rogue River, just below the town of Woodville. During the same spring a man by the name of Perkins also established a ferry on that river. The first donation land claim was located by Judge A. A. Skinner, an Indian agent, in June 1851. This claim is the Walker farm, near Central Point. Upon it he built the first settler's house ever built in the valley. Chesley Gray, his interpreter, also located a donation land claim in June 1851. It is what is known as the "Constant Farm," near Central Point.
