= Galls Creek =

Stream in Oregon, U.S.

Coordinates: 42°25′56″N 123°04′21″W

Galls Creek is a stream in the U.S. state of Oregon. It is a tributary to the Rogue River.

Galls Creek was named in the 1850s after one Jacob Gall.
