= Middle Fork Rogue River =

- Location of the mouth of the Middle Fork Rogue River in Oregon

Location
- Country: United States
- State: Oregon
- County: Klamath, Jackson

Physical characteristics
- Source: Ranger Spring
  - location: Cascade Range, Klamath County
  - coordinates: 42°41′04″N 122°10′56″W
  - elevation: 5,740 ft (1,750 m)
- Mouth: South Fork Rogue River
  - location: south of Prospect, Jackson County
  - coordinates: 42°43′11″N 122°28′22″W
  - elevation: 2,185 ft (666 m)

The Middle Fork Rogue River is a tributary of the South Fork Rogue River in the U.S. state of Oregon. It begins in Klamath County in the Sky Lakes Wilderness of the Cascade Range and flows generally northwest through the Rogue River – Siskiyou National Forest to meet the South Fork south of Prospect. The Middle Fork enters the South Fork about 4 miles (6 km) from the South Fork's confluence with the Rogue River.

== Recreation ==
The Middle Fork Trail, which follows the river for 6 miles (10 km) in a glacier-carved canyon in the wilderness, has been closed indefinitely by fallen trees killed by a forest fire. Before the fire, the trail was used for hiking and riding horses. The United States Forest Service, which manages the trail, rated the trail as "more to most difficult" before the fire.

Fishing in Oregon describes the Middle Fork as "a fair wild trout stream". The stream supports populations of wild cutthroat trout and brook trout.

Expert whitewater kayakers have sometimes run part of the Middle Fork. The segment, about 6 miles (10 km) long, is rated Class 5 on the International Scale of River Difficulty. Life-threatening hazards include "extremely difficult, long, and very violent rapids with highly congested routes". Soggy Sneakers warns that the entire run requires scouting, that the route through the Middle Fork Gorge cannot be portaged, that rescue conditions are not favorable, and that the stream is unrunable in low water.

== Tributaries and diversions ==
Named tributaries of the Middle Fork Rogue River from source to mouth are Honeymoon, Halifax, Bessie, Twentynine, Svinth, Daniel, and Red Blanket Creeks. In addition, water from the Middle Fork is diverted to a Rogue River dam and reservoir at Prospect that impounds water from the Rogue and nearby streams and diverts it to power plants. PacifiCorp operates this system, called The Prospect Nos. 1, 2, and 4 Hydroelectric Project. Built in pieces between 1911 and 1944, it includes separate diversion dams on the Middle Fork Rogue River and Red Blanket Creek, and a 9.25-mile (14.89 km) water-transport system of canals, flumes, pipes, and penstocks.

== See also ==
- List of rivers of Oregon
