= Larson Creek =

Stream in Oregon, U.S.

Coordinates: 42°47′53″N 122°29′25″W

Larson Creek is a stream in the U.S. state of Oregon. It is a tributary to the Rogue River.

Larson Creek was named in 1902 after John A. Larson, a pioneer citizen.
