= South Fork Rogue River =

River in Oregon

- Location of the mouth of the South Fork Rogue River in Oregon

Location
- Country: United States
- State: Oregon
- County: Klamath and Jackson

Physical characteristics
- Source: Cascade Range
  - location: South Blue Lake Group, Klamath County, Oregon
  - coordinates: 42°31′11″N 122°16′29″W
  - elevation: 5,619 ft (1,713 m)
- Mouth: Rogue River
  - location: downstream of Prospect, Jackson County, Oregon
  - coordinates: 42°42′41″N 122°32′48″W
  - elevation: 1,877 ft (572 m)
- Length: 25 mi (40 km)
- Discharge
  - location: 0.30 miles (0.48 km) downstream of the South Fork diversion dam and 10.2 miles (16.4 km) from the mouth
  - average: 74.9 cu ft/s (2.12 m^{3}/s)
  - minimum: 0 cu ft/s (0 m^{3}/s)
  - maximum: 7,010 cu ft/s (199 m^{3}/s)

The South Fork Rogue River is a 25-mile (40 km) tributary of the Rogue River in the U.S. state of Oregon. Rising in the Sky Lakes Wilderness in the Cascade Range, it flows generally northeast through the Rogue River – Siskiyou National Forest to meet the Rogue River downstream of Prospect and slightly upstream of Lost Creek Lake.

== Course ==
The river begins in Klamath County in the Sky Lakes Wilderness of the Cascade Range. It flows north from Horseshoe Lake for about 4 miles (6 km) before turning northeast and entering Jackson County, leaving the wilderness area and entering the Rogue River–Siskiyou National Forest. Over its next 5 miles (8 km), the river flows under Forest Road 37 at Upper South Fork Bridge, passes Upper South Fork Campground and receives Parker Creek from the left near Parker Meadows Campground, then Little Billie, Wickiup, and Sam creeks from the right. Below this, it receives Big Ben Creek from the right. The river then flows under Lower South Fork Bridge, which carries Forest Road 37, and by South Fork Campground, which is on the left. Below the bridge, the river receives Nichols and Green creeks from the right and Lodgepole Creek from the left. Imnaha Creek enters from the right at about river mile (RM) 10.5 or river kilometer (RK) 16.9 just above the South Fork diversion dam.

Turning west below the dam, the South Fork flows by a United States Geological Survey (USGS) stream gauge, which is on the left at RM 10.2 (RK 16.4). Buck Creek enters from the left about 6 miles (10 km) from the mouth, and the Middle Fork Rogue River enters from the right shortly thereafter. About 2 miles (3 km) further downstream, Beaver Dam Creek enters from the left, and Smith Creek enters from the left about 1 mile (1.6 km) later. The South Fork meets the Rogue River main stem near the head of Lost Creek Lake and about 167 miles (269 km) from the larger river's mouth on the Pacific Ocean.

== Recreation ==
The river, lightly fished on its upper reaches, supports wild rainbow, coastal cutthroat, and brook trout. Campgrounds near or along the river include those at Joseph H. Stewart State Recreation Area, Imnaha, South Fork, Parker Meadows, and Upper South Fork. Hiking trails include Upper South Fork Trail 986, a primitive 5.1-mile (8.2 km) trail through South Fork Canyon near the headwaters to near Upper South Fork Bridge and Forest Road 37; Middle South Fork Trail, an easy 6.3-mile (10.1 km) trail between the upper and lower South Fork bridges, and Lower South Fork Trail, an easy 5.3-mile (8.5 km) trail between Lower South Fork Bridge and Imnaha Creek. Whitewater boating of the highest difficulty, Class 5, is possible at times on the Middle Fork Rogue River and on the South Fork below its confluence with the Middle Fork. The gorge through which this part of the Middle and South forks flow is sometimes impassable because of log jams. The entire run, including the 0.5-mile (0.8 km) gorge, requires scouting and expert ability, and "is no place for the faint of heart or the claustrophobic". Below the gorge, the South Fork is class 3 to the mouth.

== See also ==
- List of rivers of Oregon
