= Indian Mary Park =

Coordinates: 42°33′09″N 123°32′29″W

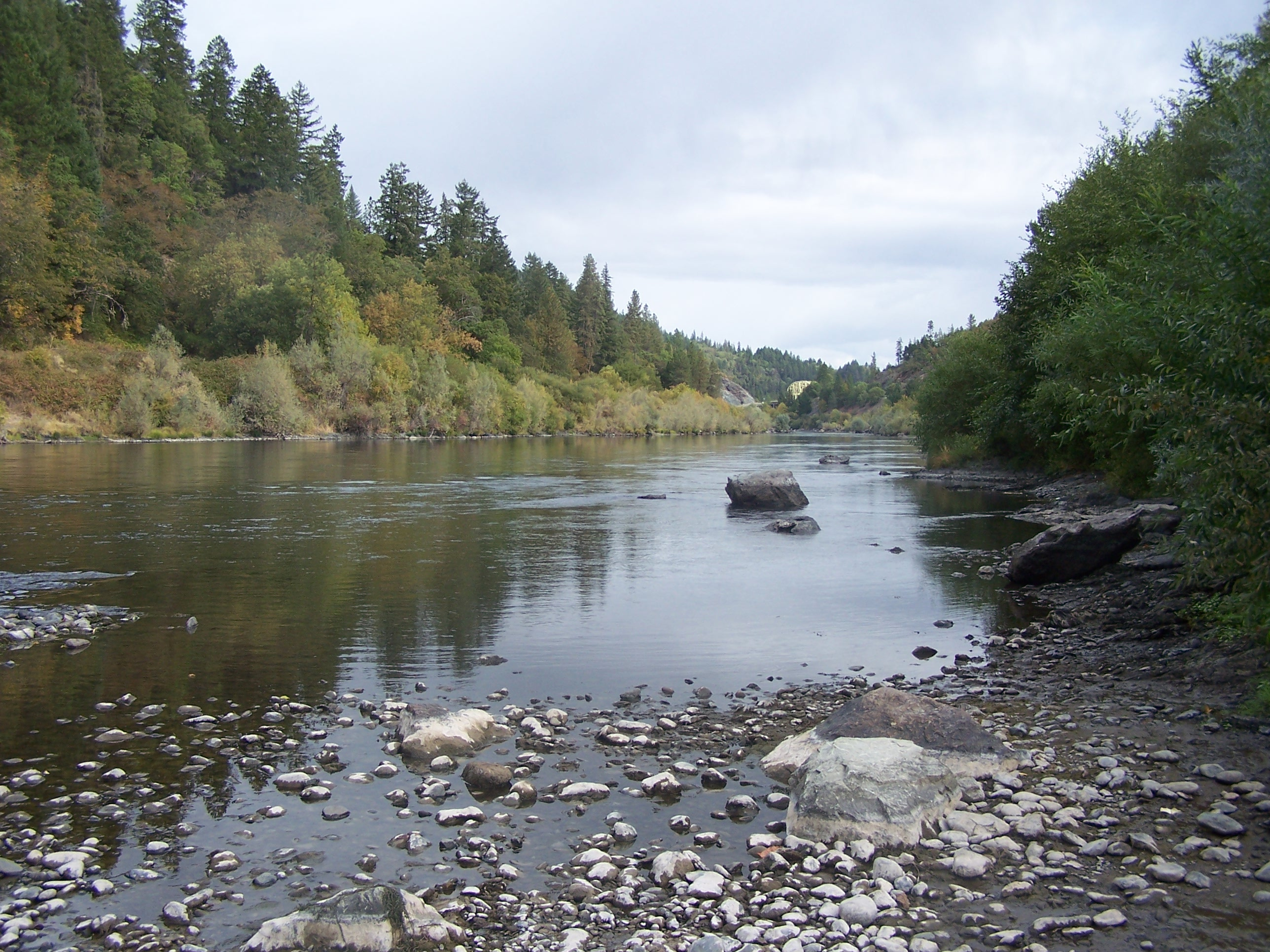
The Rogue River near Indian Mary Park.

Indian Mary Park is part of the Josephine County Parks system in the U.S. state of Oregon. Bordering the Rogue River, the 61-acre (25 ha) park is along Merlin–Galice Road, about 16 miles (26 km) northwest of the city of Grants Pass. The heavily used park is the county's most popular in summer.

The park was named for Mary Peters, who was known as "Indian Mary".

Amenities include a boat ramp, a public pay telephone, a disc golf course, and three restrooms, including two with showers. Campsites include places for tents and sites with utility hook-ups for travel trailers, as well as two five-person yurts provided with furniture, electricity, lighting, and heat. The park's entrance station has ice, firewood, and other items, and provides information. Registered campers have access to the park's dump station. The boat ramp, about 250 yards (230 m) downstream of an older one that entered relatively swift water and was not always usable, opened in August 2010.

Sites may be reserved two days to nine months in advance. The county publishes a fee schedule for various kinds of camping and other uses of the park. Non-campers are generally charged a $2 day-use fee for parking. Annual passes are available, and people entering the park on foot, by bicycle, or on a horse do not have to pay the parking fee.
