= Red Blanket Creek =

Stream in Oregon, U.S.

Coordinates: 42°43′39″N 122°28′04″W

Red Blanket Creek is a stream in the U.S. state of Oregon. It is a tributary to Middle Fork Rogue River.

Red Blanket Creek was named for an operation in which pioneers bartered red blankets for land.
