= Illinois River Trail =

Hiking trail in Oregon, USA

Coordinates: 42.4359°N 123.9206°W

The Illinois River Trail, known on maps as National Trail No. 1161, is a hiking trail located in the Siskiyou National Forest in Oregon, United States. The 27-mile (43 km) trail provides access to the Kalmiopsis Wilderness in the Klamath Mountains.

Highlights of the trail include Bald Mountain, Buzzard's Roost, Indigo Creek and the Illinois River Valley.

The trailhead is at the Briggs Creek Campground near Grants Pass. The trail terminates at Oak Flat near Agness, Oregon. A Northwest Forest Pass is needed for parking and the required free wilderness permit may be obtained at the trailhead.

The entire trail is open to backpacking and horseback riding. Under Travel Management regulations, the Illinois River Trail (from Oak Flat to the old Fantz Ranch) is open to motorcycles with an Oregon ATV permit from September 15 to May 15. No motorized or mechanized equipment (i.e., mountain bikes) are allowed past Fantz Ranch or in the Kalmiopsis Wilderness.

In July 2022, the trail was rehabilitated and reopened by the Siskiyou Mountain Club whose summer interns removed fallen trees and brush that had rendered it nearly impassable for the preceding 20 years.
