= Rock Point, Oregon =

Unincorporated community in the state of Oregon, United States

- Unincorporated community
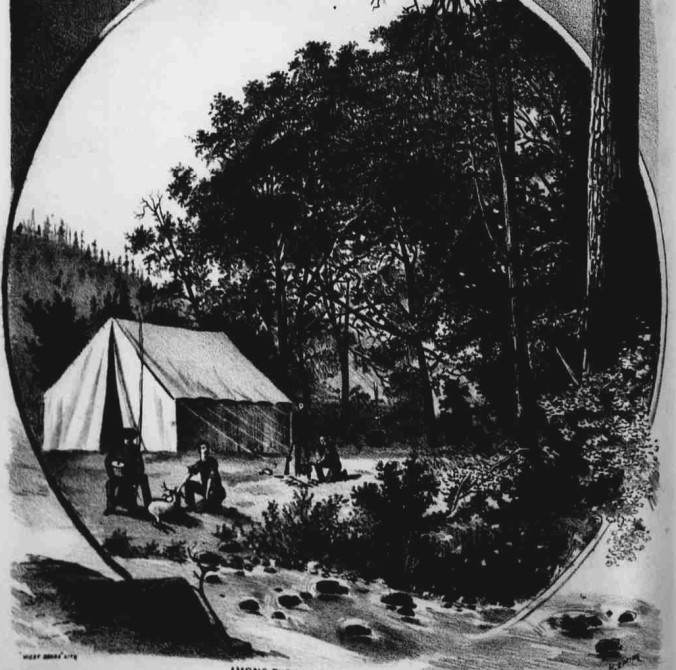
- A lithograph of Rock Point from The West Shore in 1884

- Location within Oregon Location within the United States
- Coordinates: 42°25′55″N 123°05′56″W
- Country: United States
- State: Oregon
- County: Jackson
- Elevation: 1,050 ft (320 m)
- Time zone: UTC-8 (Pacific (PST))
  - Summer (DST): UTC-7 (PDT)
- GNIS feature ID: 1126197
- Coordinates and elevation from Geographic Names Information System

Rock Point is an unincorporated community in Jackson County, Oregon, United States. Rock Point lies just north of an I-5 and Oregon Route 99 interchange along the Rogue River between the cities of Rogue River and Gold Hill.

The community's name derives from the geologic formations at this location. Writers have sometime referred to the location as Point of Rocks, and early settlers called it Dardanelles. A Dardanelles post office opened near here on October 19, 1852, with William G. T'Vault as postmaster. The T'Vault property was on the south side of the river east of Rock Point.

Rock Point was an important stop for travelers in the 19th century. A tavern built here in the 1870s is still standing. The community also had a railroad station named Rock Point and a Rock Point post office that operated from 1859 through 1912 with John B. White as the first postmaster. The community is known for a "fine concrete arch" bridge that was built by McCullough 1919, that carries the old Pacific Highway (Route 99) over the river.
