= Barr Creek Falls =

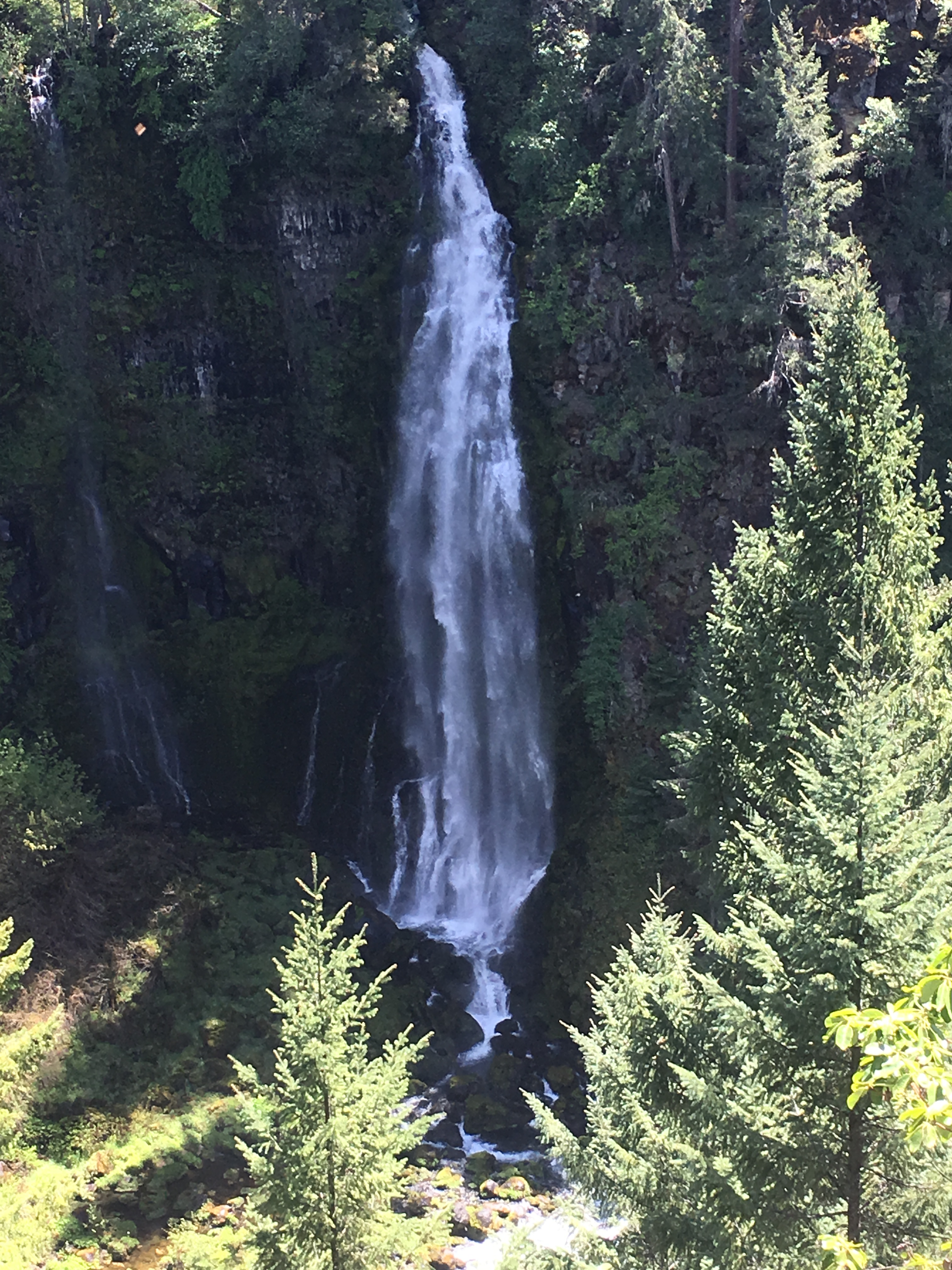
- Barr Creek Falls in May
- Interactive map of Barr Creek Falls
- Location: Prospect State Scenic Viewpoint
- Coordinates: 42.73776°N 122.49524°W
- Type: Plunge
- Elevation: 2,443 ft (745 m)
- Total height: 240 ft (73 m)
- Number of drops: 3

Barr Creek Falls, is a waterfall located in the Rogue River Canyon within the Prospect State Scenic Viewpoint in Jackson County, in the U.S. state of Oregon. The waterfall is located at the south end of Barr Creek as it plunges into the Rogue River over a carved cliff surrounded by walls of petrified volcanic ash as a consequence of the Mount Mazama eruption. The waterfall has also been called Bear Creek Falls. The waterfall gets its name from the creek which was called "Barr" for the presence of a fence that prevented cattle from straying out of the local Red Blanket Ranch and that ran adjacent to the creek.

== Description ==
Barr Creek Falls shares the same rock cliff with Mill Creek Falls. Both waterfalls can be seen next to each other from their respective viewpoints.

The fall drops in three major steps. First plummets 60-feet, which is not a visible section of the cascade from the trail viewpoint. The second tier drops down another 30 feet, which is half visible from the viewpoint during high water flow. Finally it plummets 150 feet to the canyon floor before meeting with the Rogue River. With a height of 240 feet, Barr Creek Falls is among the tallest waterfalls in Oregon.

== Location ==
Barr Creek Falls is located at the southernmost tip of the Prospect State Scenic Viewpoint. The United States Geological Survey (USGS) places the falls at coordinates 42.7462386°N 122.4955911°W at an elevation of 2,529 feet (771 m) above sea level. Barr Creek runs from the Western skirt of Crater Lake, bisects the southern end of the Prospect Airfield and plummets down the Rogue River Canyon a few yards before intersecting the Rogue River.

== Access ==
Access to the waterfall is from a trail that starts on the park's parking lot on the town of Prospect's Mill Creek Drive, the southernmost of two parking lots on the road. The trail-head has an illustrative map of the area including the trail to the Avenue of Boulders and Barr Creek Falls. The trail is approximately half a mile from the parking lot to Barr Creek Falls viewpoint.

== See also ==
- List of waterfalls
- List of waterfalls in Oregon
