= Mill Creek Falls =

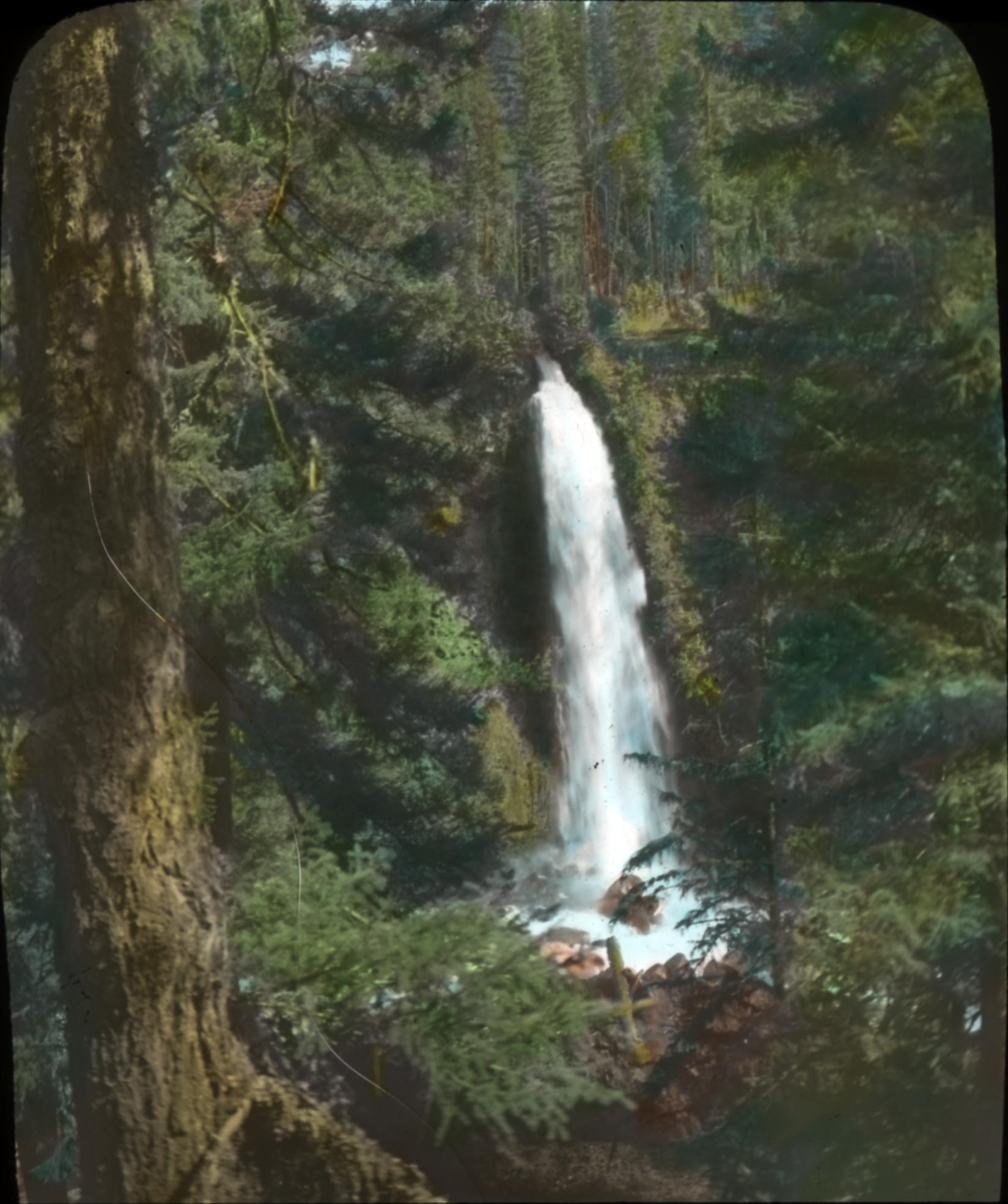
- Mill Creek Falls in July
- Interactive map of Mill Creek Falls
- Location: Prospect State Scenic Viewpoint
- Coordinates: 42.74028°N 122.49528°W
- Type: Plunge
- Elevation: 2,348 ft (716 m)
- Total height: 173 ft (53 m)
- Number of drops: 1

Mill Creek Falls, is a waterfall located in the Rogue River Canyon within the Prospect State Scenic Viewpoint in Jackson County, in the U.S. state of Oregon. The waterfall is located at the south end of Mill Creek as it plunges into the Rogue River over a carved cliff surrounded by walls of petrified volcanic ash consequence of Mount Mazama eruption.

Mill Creek Falls shares the same rock cliff with Barr Creek Falls. Both waterfalls can be seen next to each other from their respective viewpoints. With a height of 173 feet, Mill Creek Falls is among the tallest waterfalls in Oregon.

== Location ==
Mill Creek Falls is located at the southernmost tip of the Prospect State Scenic Viewpoint. The United States Geological Survey (USGS) places the falls at coordinates 42.7403193°N 122.4952308°W at an elevation of 2,365 feet (721 m) above sea level. The Mill Creek Falls Scenic Area is one of the trails and viewing areas designed and constructed by the Boise Cascade Corporation.

=== Mill Creek ===
Mill Creek crosses through the Prospect State Scenic Viewpoint and the town of Prospect. Both Barr Creek and Mill Creek run parallel to each other from the Mill Creek Campground until plunging into the Rogue River Canyon. Further East Mill Creek flows from the west hills of Huckleberry Mountain on the west skirt of the Crater Lake National Park. Mill Creek has several tributaries including the North Fork Mill Creek which begins on the north hills of Huckleberry Mountain near Union Creek.

== Access ==
Access to the waterfall is from a trail that starts on the park's parking lot on the town of Prospect's Mill Creek Drive, the southernmost of two parking lots on the road. The trail-head has an illustrative map of the area including the trail to the Avenue of Boulders and Mill Creek Falls. The trail is approximately half a mile from the parking lot to Mill Creek Falls viewpoint followed by the Barr Creek Falls viewpoint.

== See also ==
- List of waterfalls in Oregon
