= Bitter Lick, Oregon =

Unincorporated community in the state of Oregon, United States

- Unincorporated community
- Location within Oregon Location within the United States
- Coordinates: 42°47′34″N 122°38′19″W
- Country: United States
- State: Oregon
- County: Jackson
- Elevation: 1,972 ft (601 m)
- Time zone: UTC-8 (Pacific (PST))
  - Summer (DST): UTC-7 (PDT)
- GNIS feature ID: 1155015

Bitter Lick is an unincorporated community in Jackson County, Oregon, United States. It lies at the confluence of Bitter Lick Creek and Elk Creek, northwest of the ghost town of Persist. Bitter Lick is in the northern part of the county, north of Lost Creek Lake, a reservoir on the Rogue River.

The name describes a large nearby spring with a strong taste. The creek and the community take their name from the spring.
