= Cascade Gorge, Oregon =

Unincorporated community in the state of Oregon, United States

- Unincorporated community
- Location within Oregon Location within the United States
- Coordinates: 42°42′56″N 122°34′07″W
- Country: United States
- State: Oregon
- County: Jackson
- Elevation: 2,293 ft (699 m)
- Time zone: UTC-8 (Pacific (PST))
  - Summer (DST): UTC-7 (PDT)
- GNIS feature ID: 1139419
- Coordinates and elevation from Geographic Names Information System

Cascade Gorge is an unincorporated community in Jackson County, Oregon, United States. It lies along the Rogue River downstream of Prospect near the upper end of Lost Creek Lake. Oregon Route 62 (Crater Lake Highway) passes through Cascade Gorge. The South Fork Rogue River enters the main stem slightly upstream of Cascade Gorge on the opposite (left) bank.
