= Rogue River Press =

Weekly newspaper published in Rogue River, Oregon

- Type: Weekly newspaper
- Owner(s): Valley Pride Publications, LLC
- Publisher: Teresa Pearson
- Founded: 1915
- Language: American English
- City: Rogue River, Oregon
- Country: United States
- Circulation: 1,630
- OCLC number: 30722092
- Website: rogueriverpress.com

The Rogue River Press is a weekly newspaper serving the southern part of the U.S. state of Oregon, established in 1915. It is published in Jackson County and circulates about 1,630 newspapers to Rogue River, Gold Hill, Wimer, and the Evans Valley. It is a venue for reaching the public, though its selection over the larger Mail Tribune for publishing foreclosure notices in 2012 was part of an effort that met with criticism.

== History ==
The Press was founded in 1915. Hal Wood owned the paper for about two years until selling it to Umpqua Free Press, Inc. The paper has been owned by Valley Pride Publications since 2006, and its publisher is Teresa Pearson.
