= Beagle, Oregon =

Unincorporated community in the state of Oregon, United States

- Unincorporated community
- Location within Oregon Location within the United States
- Coordinates: 42°32′04″N 122°55′31″W
- Country: United States
- State: Oregon
- County: Jackson
- Elevation: 1,404 ft (428 m)
- Time zone: UTC-8 (Pacific (PST))
  - Summer (DST): UTC-7 (PDT)
- GNIS feature ID: 1159293

Beagle is an unincorporated community in Jackson County, Oregon, United States. It lies along Beagle Road, off Oregon Route 234, northeast of Gold Hill and southwest of Shady Cove in the Rogue River Valley.

The community is named after William Beagle, an early settler. Beagle had a post office from 1885 through 1941. William Beagle was one of its early postmasters.
