= Dillon Falls (Jackson County, Oregon) =

Rapids along the Rogue River in the U.S. state of Oregon

- Interactive map of Dillon Falls
- Location: Near Grants Pass, Oregon
- Coordinates: 42.45806°N 123.02528°W
- Type: Cataract
- Elevation: 1,089 feet (332 m)
- Total height: 10 ft (3 m)
- Watercourse: Rogue River, Oregon

Dillon Falls (also known as Nugget Falls, Hat-rue Falls or Tolo Falls) are a series of rapids along the Rogue River in the U.S. state of Oregon just north of the town of Gold Hill in the east stretch of the Rogue River–Siskiyou National Forest.

== Location ==
Dillon Falls are near Grants Pass along Interstate 5. They are located on a section where the Rogue River funnels into a narrow channel shortly before reaching the main drop of the waterfall, approximately 10 feet high ending on a calm pool. Considered Class IV rapids, the stretch of Dillon Falls continues with two whitewater waves a short distance from another rapid waterfall, Ti'lomikh Falls.

== See also ==
- List of waterfalls in Oregon
