= Oregon Route 234 =

State highway in Jackson County, Oregon, US

Oregon Route 234
- Route 234 highlighted in red

Route information
- Maintained by ODOT
- Length: 17.78 mi (28.61 km)
- Existed: 1954–present

Major junctions
- West end: OR 99 near Gold Hill
- I-5 in Gold Hill
- East end: OR 62 near Eagle Point

Location
- Country: United States
- State: Oregon
- County: Jackson

Highway system
- Oregon Highways; Interstate; US; State; Named; Scenic
← OR 233	→ OR 237

Oregon Route 234 is an Oregon state highway which runs between the city of Gold Hill, Oregon and the town of Eagle Point. Known as the Sams Valley Highway No. 271, it extends for 18 miles (29 km), entirely within Jackson County.

== Route description ==
OR 234 begins, at its western terminus, at an interchange with Interstate 5 in Gold Hill. For the first several miles of the highway's existence, it is concurrent with Oregon Route 99, which departs from the freeway to serve Gold Hill. In the city center, OR 234 and OR 99 diverge; with the latter returning to the freeway. OR 234 then heads northeast, passing through the northern edge of the Rogue Valley and the Cascade foothills. It passes nearby the community of Sams Valley, and ends at an intersection with Oregon Route 62, north of Eagle Point.

== Major intersections ==
The entire route is in Jackson County.

Location	mi	km	Destinations	Notes
Gold Hill	−0.30	−0.48	OR 99 north / I-5 – Rogue River, Grants Pass, Medford	Western end of concurrency with OR 99
Gold Hill	2.36	3.80	OR 99 south – Central Point	Eastern end of concurrency with OR 99
Eagle Point	17.48	28.13	OR 62 – Shady Cove, Crater Lake, Eagle Point, Medford	
1.000 mi = 1.609 km; 1.000 km = 0.621 mi
