= Pinehurst, Oregon =

Unincorporated community in the state of Oregon, United States

- Unincorporated community
- Location within Oregon Location within the United States
- Coordinates: 42°07′04″N 122°21′58″W
- Country: United States
- State: Oregon
- County: Jackson
- Elevation: 3,373 ft (1,028 m)
- Time zone: UTC-8 (Pacific (PST))
  - Summer (DST): UTC-7 (PDT)
- Area codes: 458 and 541
- GNIS feature ID: 1125418
- Coordinates and elevation from Geographic Names Information System

Pinehurst is an unincorporated community in Jackson County, Oregon, United States, on Oregon Route 66 (OR 66) about 25 miles (40 km) southeast of Ashland. It is along Jenny Creek near Round Prairie between the Siskiyou Mountains and the foothills of the Cascade Range.

== History ==
Pinehurst was one of the small sawmill towns along an early stagecoach and wagon freight route between the Rogue Valley and the Klamath Basin. This road, also known as the Green Springs Highway, was the original route of the Applegate Trail. The name "Pinehurst" comes from the word "pine" and the Old English word hurst, meaning woods. Pinehurst is named for its location in a Ponderosa Pine belt.

In 1878, there was a post office in the Pinehurst area named "Pioneer"; it closed in 1882. The nearby post office named "Shake" established in 1886 was moved and renamed "Pinehurst" in 1911. In 1915, Pinehurst had a population of 20 and a public school. By 1940, Pinehurst had a population of ten. An inn at the town was formerly the supper stop on the Greyhound bus route between Ashland and Klamath Falls until it burned down. As of 1990 the only structure in the community was a two-story log structure dating to the 1920s. The log building was a roadhouse that was built when OR 66 bypassed the former Applegate Trail route. As of 2010, the building was a bed and breakfast—the Historic Pinehurst Inn—but has since closed.

The original stagecoach stop was the 1904 ranch house at Green Springs Box R Ranch in the Pinehurst area. The owners sold part of the property in 2016 to New Frontier Ranch, which offers guest accommodations.

The nearby Buckhorn Mineral Springs Resort is a historic mineral spa on the National Register of Historic Places.

== Education ==
Pinehurst School, which is about two miles west of the community, in an area known as Lincoln, is the only school in the Pinehurst School District. It serves students from kindergarten through eighth grade. The 1908 school building is recognized by Jackson County as having primary historical significance.

== Climate ==
This region experiences warm (but not hot) and dry summers, with no average monthly temperatures above 71.6 °F (22.0 °C). According to the Köppen Climate Classification system, Pinehurst has a warm-summer Mediterranean climate, abbreviated "Csb" on climate maps.

== See also ==
- Pinehurst State Airport
- Tub Springs State Wayside
