= Foots Creek, Oregon =

Unincorporated community in the state of Oregon, United States

- Census-designated place
- Location within Oregon Location within the United States
- Coordinates: 42°22′30″N 123°08′24″W
- Country: United States
- State: Oregon
- County: Jackson

Area
  - Total: 6.08 sq mi (15.75 km^{2})
  - Land: 6.07 sq mi (15.72 km^{2})
  - Water: 0.015 sq mi (0.04 km^{2})
- Elevation: 1,099 ft (335 m)

Population (2020)
  - Total: 734
  - Density: 121/sq mi (46.7/km^{2})
- Time zone: UTC-8 (Pacific)
  - Summer (DST): UTC-7 (Pacific)
- ZIP code: 97525
- Area codes: 458 and 541
- FIPS code: 41-26165
- GNIS feature ID: 2611730

Foots Creek is an unincorporated community and census-designated place (CDP) in Jackson County, in the U.S. state of Oregon. It lies along Oregon Route 99 near the mouth of Foots Creek, where it empties into the Rogue River. Interstate 5 and Valley of the Rogue State Park are on the side of the river opposite Foots Creek.

For statistical purposes, the United States Census Bureau has defined Foots Creek as a census-designated place (CDP). The census definition of the area may not precisely correspond to local understanding of the area with the same name. As of the 2020 census, Foots Creek had a population of 734.

The community "has been known as Bolt since pioneer days." The stream takes its name from O. G. Foot, a miner who prospected along the stream in the 19th century. A post office named Foots Creek had a brief existence in this vicinity in 1878–79. Silas Draper was the postmaster.

== Demographics ==
Historical population
Census	Pop.	Note	%±
2020	734		—
U.S. Decennial Census
