= Rogue Elk, Oregon =

Unincorporated community in the state of Oregon, United States

- Unincorporated community
- Location within Oregon Location within the United States
- Coordinates: 42°39′44″N 122°45′34″W
- Country: United States
- State: Oregon
- County: Jackson
- Elevation: 1,486 ft (453 m)
- Time zone: UTC-8 (Pacific (PST))
  - Summer (DST): UTC-7 (PDT)
- GNIS feature ID: 1159019
- Coordinates and elevation from Geographic Names Information System

Rogue Elk is an unincorporated community in Jackson County, Oregon, United States. It lies along Oregon Route 62 and the Rogue River between Shady Cove and Prospect. Elk Creek enters the river at Rogue Elk.

Rogue Elk County Park is by the river. This 33-acre (13 ha) park offers river access, fishing, rafting, swimming, and picnicking. It has riverfront campsites as well as sites for recreational vehicles (RVs) with hookups for water and electricity. Amenities include restrooms, showers, barbecues, a playground, and a two-lane boat ramp, which is open year-round. The campground is generally open from mid-March to late October.
