= Table Rock, Oregon =

Unincorporated community in Oregon, United States

- Unincorporated community
- Location within Oregon Location within the United States
- Coordinates: 42°27′04″N 122°54′46″W
- Country: United States
- State: Oregon
- County: Jackson
- Elevation: 1,204 ft (367 m)
- Time zone: UTC-8 (Pacific (PST))
  - Summer (DST): UTC-7 (PDT)
- GNIS feature ID: 1136812
- Coordinates and elevation from Geographic Names Information System

Table Rock is an unincorporated community in Jackson County, Oregon, United States. It lies near the Rogue River along Table Rock Road between White City and Sams Valley. The topographic features known as Upper and Lower Table Rock are slightly west of the community. Between 1853 and 1856, the Table Rock Indian Reservation lay between Upper Table Rock and Evans Creek, a Rogue River tributary to the west.

A Table Rock post office operated in the vicinity of the two topographic landmarks from 1872 to 1895, until postal authorities changed the office name to Tablerock. Thomas Gianini was the first postmaster. Until the office permanently closed, it continued under the Tablerock name from 1895 through 1906 at varied locations in the valley near the two 1,000-foot (300 m) mesas.

In 1949, the Southern Pacific opened a Table Rock station on its Siskiyou Line between Eugene and Black Butte, California. The station was about 3.5 miles (5.6 km) north of Central Point. The Pacific and Eastern Railway also had a Table Rock station near White City. Formerly known as the Medford and Crater Lake Railroad, it operated on 34 miles (55 km) of track between Medford and Butte Falls.
