= Starvation Heights, Oregon =

Unincorporated community in the state of Oregon, United States

- Unincorporated community
- Location within Oregon Location within the United States
- Coordinates: 42°29′07″N 123°10′05″W
- Country: United States
- State: Oregon
- County: Jackson
- Elevation: 1,332 ft (406 m)
- Time zone: UTC-8 (Pacific (PST))
  - Summer (DST): UTC-7 (PDT)
- Area codes: 458 and 541
- GNIS feature ID: 1136786
- Coordinates and elevation from Geographic Names Information System

Starvation Heights is an unincorporated community in Jackson County, in the U.S. state of Oregon. It is about 4 miles (6 km) north of the community of Rogue River, and 9 miles (14 km) east-northeast of Grants Pass. It lies along East Evans Creek Road off Interstate 5 and Oregon Route 99.

It was named before 1883 for its poor and infertile soil, a granite-like mix which supported only scrub vegetation. The neighboring rise is slightly lower in elevation, but had rich soil. Failed farmers were said to be "starved out" when they moved on.
