= Sams Valley, Oregon =

Unincorporated community in the state of Oregon, United States

- Unincorporated community
- Location within Oregon Location within the United States
- Coordinates: 42°29′30″N 122°58′27″W
- Country: United States
- State: Oregon
- County: Jackson
- Elevation: 1,273 ft (388 m)
- Time zone: UTC-8 (Pacific (PST))
  - Summer (DST): UTC-7 (PDT)
- ZIP code: 97525
- Area codes: 458 and 541
- GNIS feature ID: 1126544
- Coordinates and elevation from Geographic Names Information System

Sams Valley is an unincorporated community in Jackson County, Oregon, United States. It lies along Oregon Route 234 northeast of Gold Hill, in the Medford area.

Originally named "Moonville", the community takes its name from a valley that was named after Chief Sam of the Rogue River tribe of Native Americans. Sams Valley had its own post office from 1873 until 1953. Today, the communities of Beagle, Antioch, and Table Rock are all considered part of Sams Valley.
