= Palmerton Arboretum =

Arboretum in Rogue River, Oregon

- Interactive map of Palmerton Arboretum
- Type: Arboretum
- Location: Rogue River, Oregon, United States
- Coordinates: 42.44004°N 123.173°W
- Area: 5-acre (2.0 ha)
- Status: Open to the public

The Palmerton Arboretum is an arboretum of 5 acres (20,000 m^{2}) which contains almost 90 species of trees and shrubs from around the world. It is located on West Evans Creek Road in Rogue River, Oregon, United States on the site of a 1930s-era tree nursery. Admission is free.

The Arboretum features over 40 species of mature trees including Japanese pines, Mediterranean cedars, redwoods, and other trees native to the Pacific Northwest. It also contains several kinds of azaleas and rhododendrons, plus a variety of other labeled plants, shrubs and trees, as well as a duck pond, playground, and picnic area.

== See also ==
- List of botanical gardens and arboretums in the United States
