= Persist, Oregon =

- Ghost town
- Location within Oregon Location within the United States
- Coordinates: 42°45′59″N 122°36′26″W
- Country: United States
- State: Oregon
- County: Jackson
- Elevation: 2,844 ft (867 m)
- Time zone: UTC-8 (Pacific (PST))
  - Summer (DST): UTC-7 (PDT)
- GNIS feature ID: 1161472
- Coordinates and elevation from Geographic Names Information System

Persist is a ghost town in Jackson County, in the U.S. state of Oregon. It lies in the mountains north of Lost Creek Lake on the Rogue River downstream of Prospect.

== History ==
Persist was so named because the town "persisted" for over a decade until the request of local residents for a post office was granted. William W. Willitts, who with his wife had persisted in seeking the post office, was the first postmaster. Before this, the Willitts and others in Persist got their mail by going to Trail along a 22-mile (35 km) trail or to Prospect along a 10-mile (16 km) trail. The post office opened in 1902, and remained in operation until it was discontinued in 1935.
