= Josine Ianco-Starrels =

Romanian-born American art curator (1926–2019)

- Born: October 17, 1926; Bucharest, Romania
- Died: April 8, 2019 (aged 92); Rogue River, Oregon, U.S.
- Occupation: Curator

Josine Ianco-Starrels (October 17, 1926 – April 8, 2019) was a Romanian-born American art curator who worked as a museum director in Los Angeles, California.

== Background ==
Ianco-Starrels was born in Bucharest in 1926 and her family fled to Israel, then Palestine, during World War II. She was the daughter of Amélie Micheline "Lily" Ackermann and Marcel Janco, who was an artist, an architect and one of the founding members of Dadaism. She married Harold Manson in 1950 and moved to New York where she studied at the Art Students League of New York. Her second marriage was with Herbert Kline, a documentary filmmaker. She was married to Maurie Starrels from 1969 until his death in 2000.

== Career ==
Ianco-Starrels started her curatorial career in Los Angeles with Lytton Center of the Visual Arts in 1960. She was an associate professor at Art Gallery Division at California State University, Los Angeles from 1969 to 1975. From 1975 to 1987, Ianco-Starrels was Director of the Los Angeles Municipal Art Gallery at Barnsdall Park and was senior curator at the Long Beach Museum of Art from 1987 – 1990. In 1985, Ianco-Starrels was awarded an honorary doctorate from Parsons School of Design. In her career, she was responsible for many exhibits in Southern California from 1960's to 2000. She retired in 2000, and moved to Rogue River, Oregon.

Ianco-Starrels compiled The Times' Art News column for a number of years and was recognized for her work in her curatorial career counting exhibitions of then unknown artists, organizing the first exhibition of art by women in California in 1968, and including visual arts in L.A. festival.

In April 2007, Ianco-Starrels won an ArtScene Special Recognition Award for Non-Artist who made the greatest impact on the California Art Scene in the past 25 years. She was nominated alongside the likes of Frank Gehry, Stephanie Barron and Eli Broad.

Ianco-Starrels died on April 8, 2019, in Rogue River, Oregon, at the age of 92.
