= Prospect Hotel =

- U.S. National Register of Historic Places
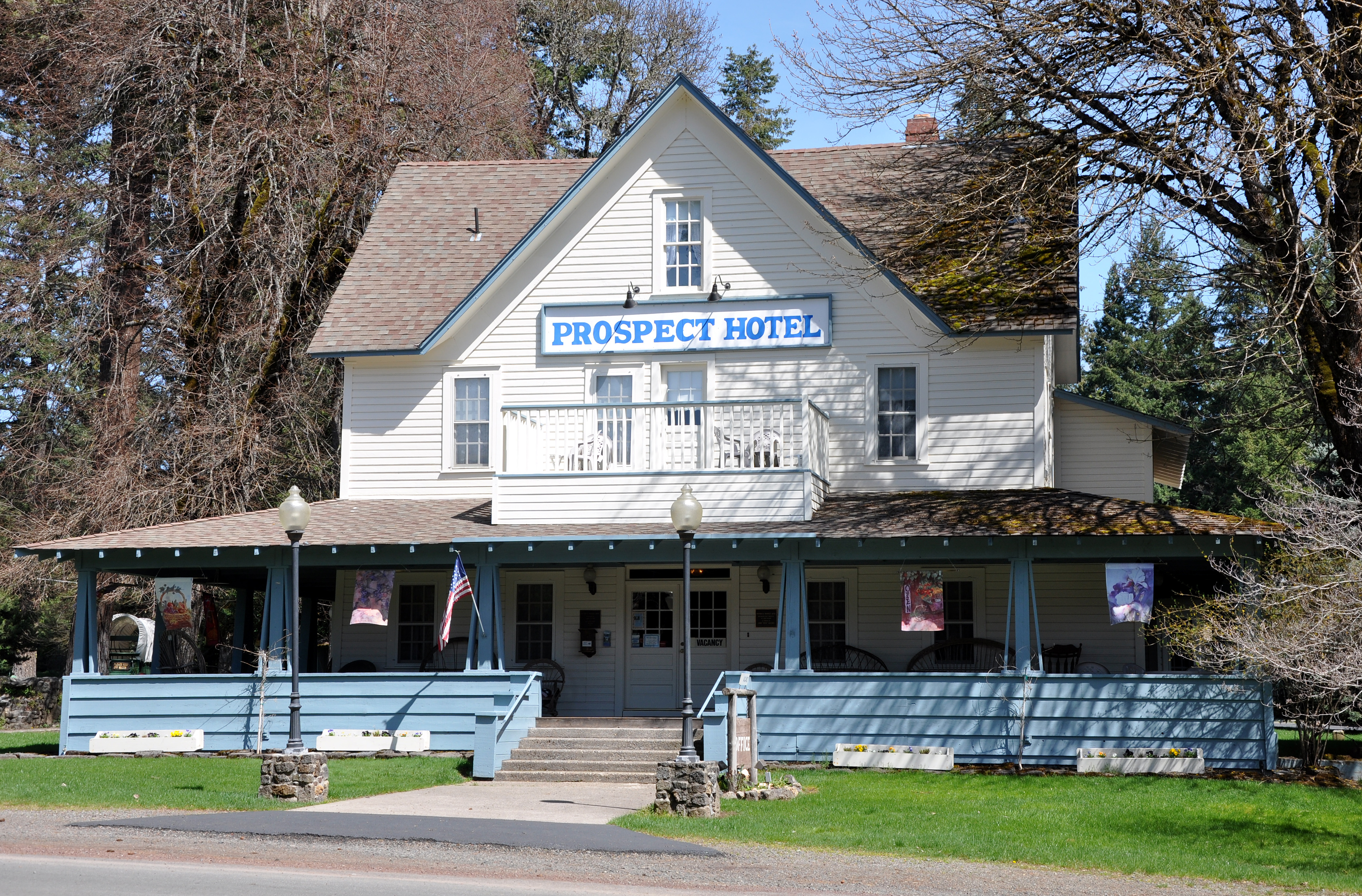
- Prospect Hotel in 2010

- Location within Oregon Location within the United States
- Location: 39 Mill Creek Drive, Prospect, Oregon
- Coordinates: 42°45′04″N 122°29′12″W
- Built: 1892
- Architect: A. H. Boothby
- Architectural style: Eclectic
- NRHP reference No.: 80003327
- Added to NRHP: February 12, 1980

The Prospect Hotel, also known as the A. H. Boothby House, in Prospect, Oregon, is two-story hotel listed on the National Register of Historic Places. Built in 1892 as a private home, it was added to the register in 1980.

Located on the community's main street, Mill Creek Drive, the hotel and several tourist cabins occupy a 5-acre (2.0 ha) site near the Prospect School and Prospect Store. The hotel is a short distance from Oregon Route 62, the main highway from Medford to Crater Lake. The L-shaped building with four large gables has a 10-foot (3.0 m) veranda, added in about 1915, that extends from three sides of the main building. The rear of the hotel includes a shed addition.

Called the Boothby House by its original owner, it was turned into a hotel for people traveling by wagon to Crater Lake in the last decade of the 19th century. During the first two decades of the 20th century, the hotel evolved into a tourist stop for automobile travelers. Guests who signed the register included William Jennings Bryan, Zane Grey, Joaquin Miller, and Jack London.

== See also ==
- National Register of Historic Places listings in Jackson County, Oregon
