= Mountain View, Oregon =

Unincorporated community in the state of Oregon, United States

- Unincorporated community
- Location within Oregon Location within the United States
- Coordinates: 42.112°N 122.384°W
- Country: United States
- State: Oregon
- County: Jackson
- Elevation: 3,619 ft (1,103 m)
- Time zone: UTC-8 (Pacific (PST))
  - Summer (DST): UTC-7 (PDT)
- ZIP code: 97520
- Area codes: 458 and 541
- GNIS feature ID: 1136554
- Coordinates and elevation from Geographic Names Information System

Mountain View is an unincorporated community in Jackson County, Oregon, United States. It lies along Oregon Route 66 between Ashland and Klamath Falls in the Siskiyou Mountains. It is within the boundaries of the Cascade–Siskiyou National Monument. Pinehurst State Airport is on the outskirts of Mountain View.
