= Seven Oaks, Oregon =

Unincorporated community in the state of Oregon, United States

- Unincorporated community
- Location within Oregon Location within the United States
- Coordinates: 42°23′32″N 122°56′17″W
- Country: United States
- State: Oregon
- County: Jackson
- Elevation: 1,230 ft (370 m)
- Time zone: UTC-8 (Pacific (PST))
  - Summer (DST): UTC-7 (PDT)
- GNIS feature ID: 1166710
- Coordinates and elevation from Geographic Names Information System

Seven Oaks is an unincorporated community in Jackson County, Oregon, United States. It lies along Oregon Route 99, about 3 miles (5 km) north of Central Point and slightly west of Interstate 5 (I-5). I-5 has an interchange at Seven Oaks.
