= Jackson County, Oregon =

County in Oregon, United States

- County
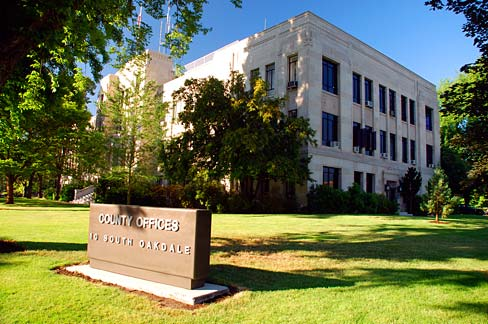
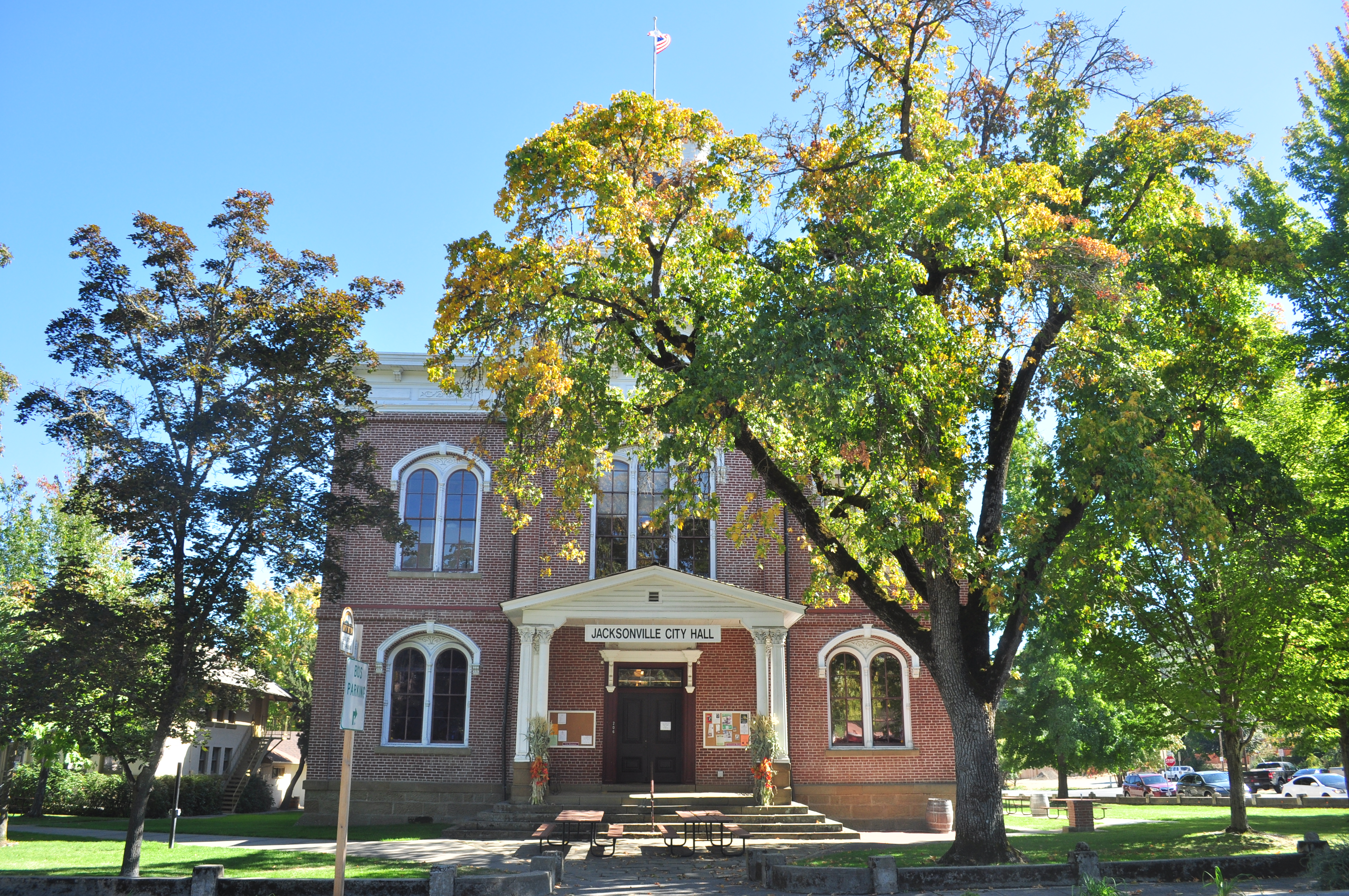
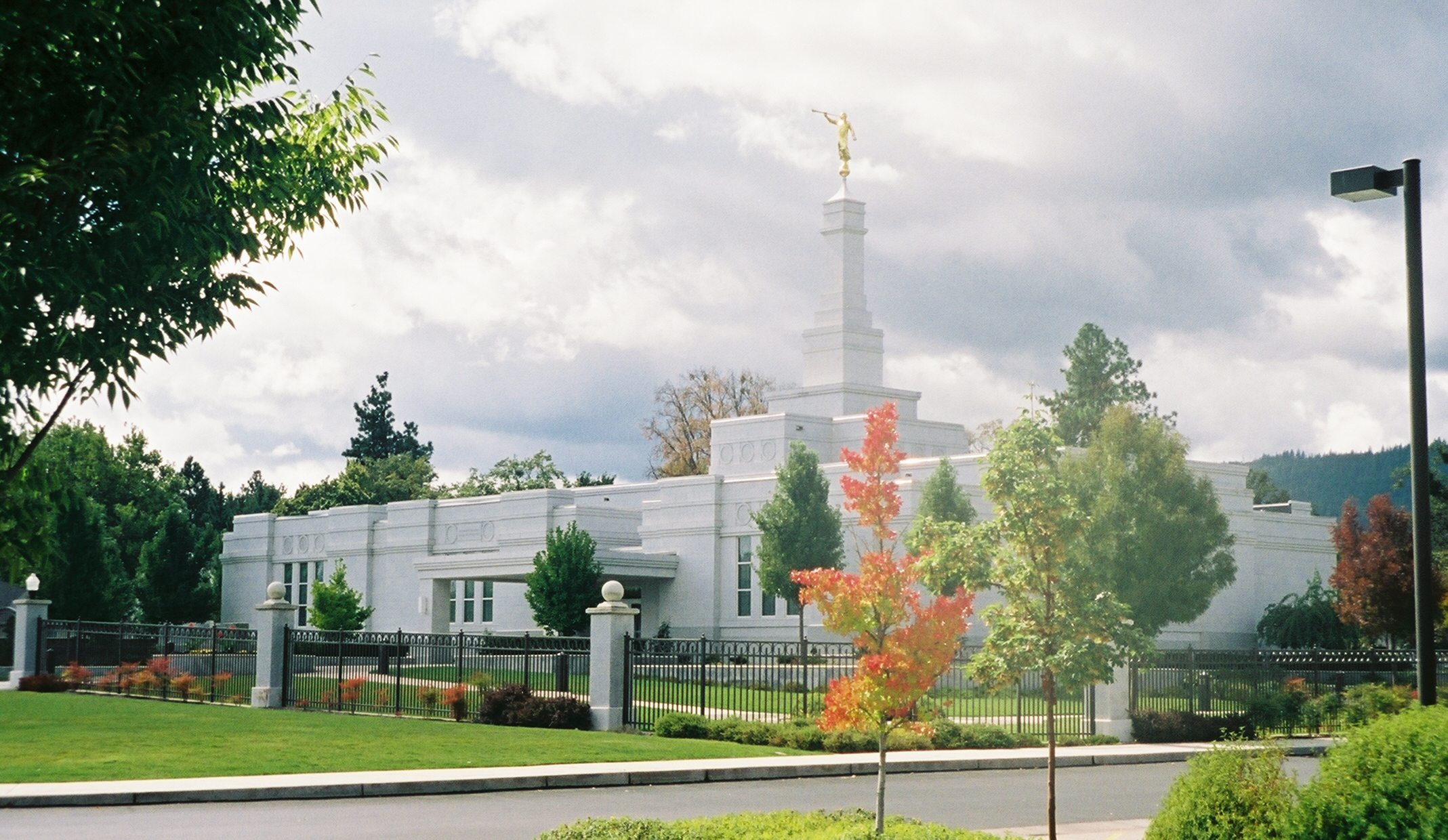
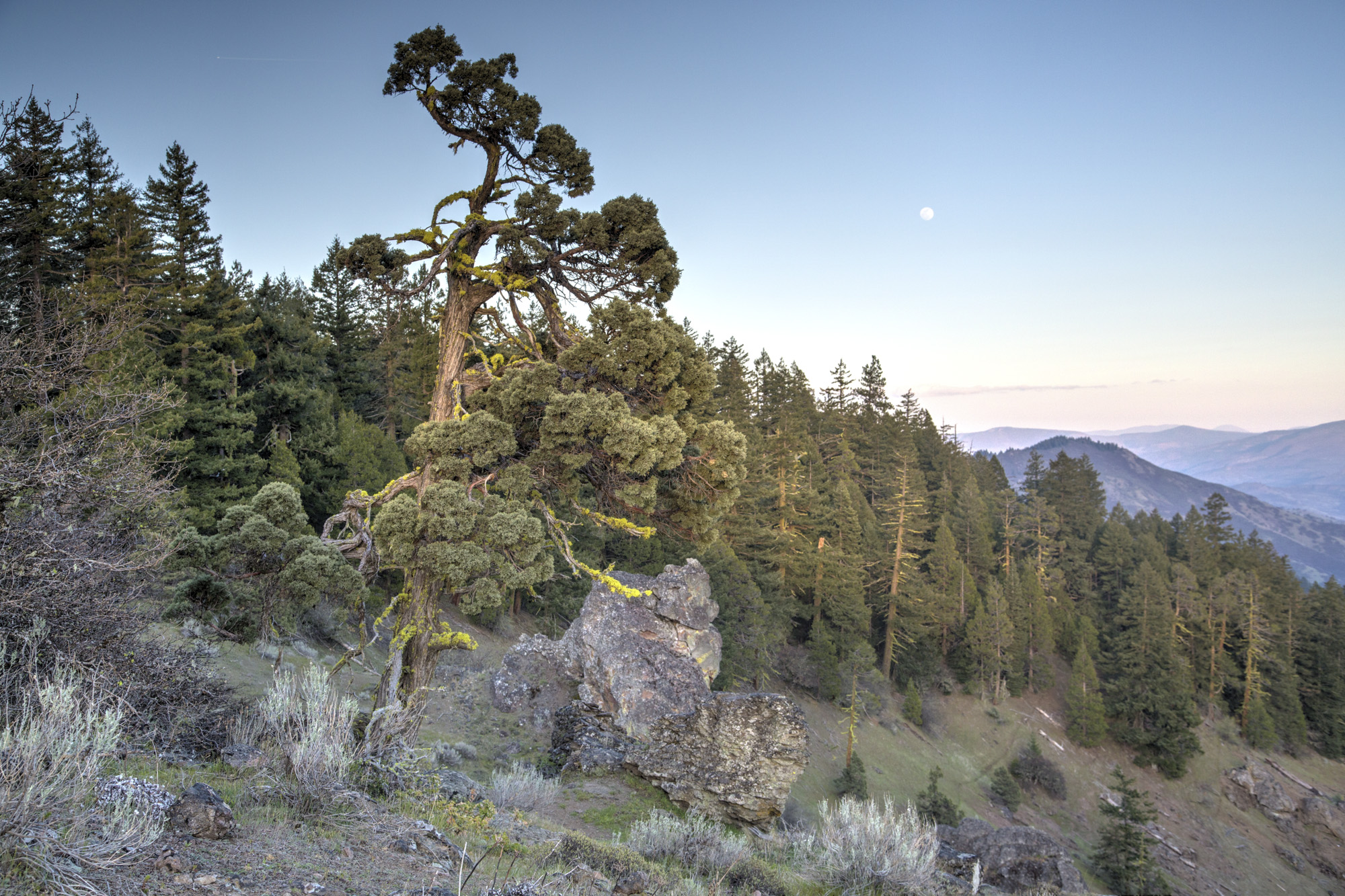
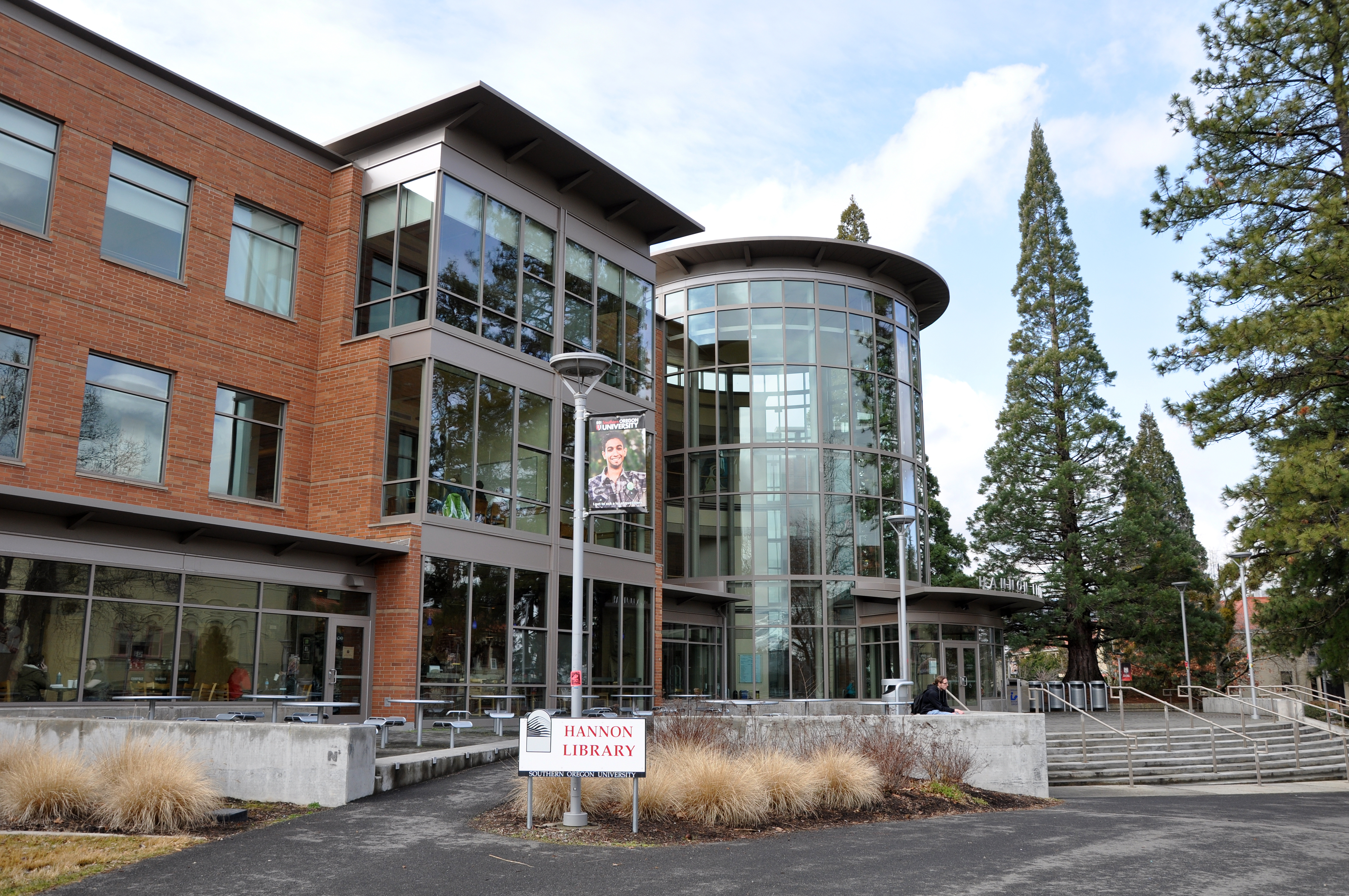
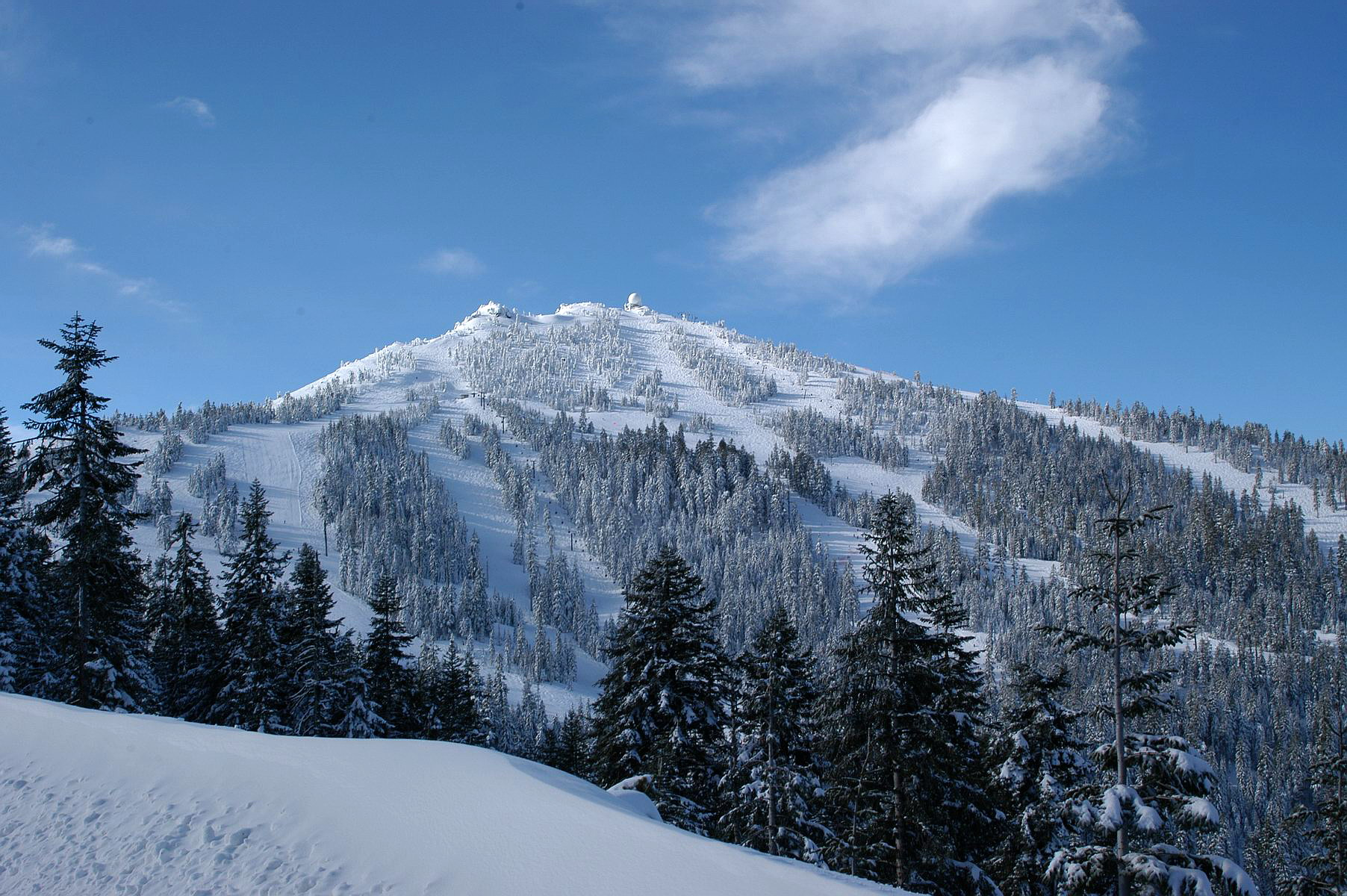
- From top clockwise: Jackson County Courthouse and Office Building, Medford Mormon Temple, Southern Oregon University's Hannon Library, Cascade–Siskiyou National Monument, Mount Ashland, Old Jackson County Courthouse

- Seal

- Location within the U.S. state of Oregon
- Coordinates: 42°25′N 122°44′W
- Country: United States
- State: Oregon
- Founded: January 12, 1852
- Named for: Andrew Jackson
- Seat: Medford
- Largest city: Medford

Area
  - Total: 2,802 sq mi (7,260 km^{2})
  - Land: 2,784 sq mi (7,210 km^{2})
  - Water: 18 sq mi (47 km^{2}) 1%

Population (2020)
  - Total: 223,259
  - Estimate (2025): 221,795 ▼
  - Density: 80.19/sq mi (30.96/km^{2})
- Time zone: UTC−8 (Pacific)
  - Summer (DST): UTC−7 (PDT)
- Congressional district: 2nd
- Website: jacksoncountyor.gov

Jackson County is one of the 36 counties in the U.S. state of Oregon. As of the 2020 census, the population was 223,259. The county seat is Medford. The county is named for Andrew Jackson, the seventh president of the United States. Jackson County comprises the Medford, OR Metropolitan Statistical Area. There are 11 incorporated cities and 34 unincorporated communities in Jackson County; the largest is Medford, which has been the county seat since 1927.

== History ==
The Modoc, Shasta, Takelma, Latgawa, and Umpqua Indian tribes are all native to the region of present Jackson County. Prior to the 1850s, the Klickitats from the north raided the area.

The Territorial Legislature created Jackson County on January 12, 1852, from the southwestern portion of Lane County and the unorganized area south of Douglas and Umpqua Counties. It included lands which now lie in Coos, Curry, Josephine, Klamath and Lake Counties. Gold discoveries in the Illinois River valley and the Rogue River valley near Jacksonville in 1852, and the completion of a wagon road connecting the county with California to the south and Douglas County to the north led to an influx of non-native settlers.

Conflict between the miners and Native Americans led to war in 1853, which continued intermittently until the final defeat of the last band under chiefs John and George by a combined force of regular army and civilians May 29, 1856, at Big Bend on the Rogue River. The Native Americans had received the worse of the fighting throughout this conflict, and as they began to surrender, they were herded to existing reservations, beginning in January 1856 when one group was marched to the Grand Ronde Indian Reservation west of Salem. Over the following months, other groups were forced to leave until by May 1857 almost all of the Shasta, Takelma, and Latgawas tribes had been relocated to the Siletz Reservation, where they remained.

Jacksonville was designated as the first county seat in 1853. However, Jacksonville declined due to diminishing returns in the local goldfields and the construction in the 1880s of the Oregon and California Railroad. This railroad bypassed Jacksonville and instead went through Medford, located five miles (8 km) east of Jacksonville. Medford's prospects improved because of the location of the railroad and the accompanying commerce and development as Jacksonville continued its steady decline. Jacksonville fended off suggestions to move the county seat until 1927 when Medford was finally selected as the county seat.

In March 2004, Jackson County became the first of an eventual 35 counties in Oregon to implement a voluntary plan of fireproofing homes situated on properties zoned as part of the forestland-urban interface. This requires homeowners to maintain a 30-foot (9 m) or greater firebreak around their structures, and affects 12,000 homeowners. In 2007, this plan becomes mandatory for many landowners, under threat of liability if their property is involved in a fire.

On May 15, 2007, residents voted not to reopen the county's 15 libraries, which had been closed since April 6 due to a shortage of funds. This was the largest library closure in the history of the United States. The libraries were reopened, with reduced hours, on October 24, 2007.

== Geography ==
Map of Jackson County

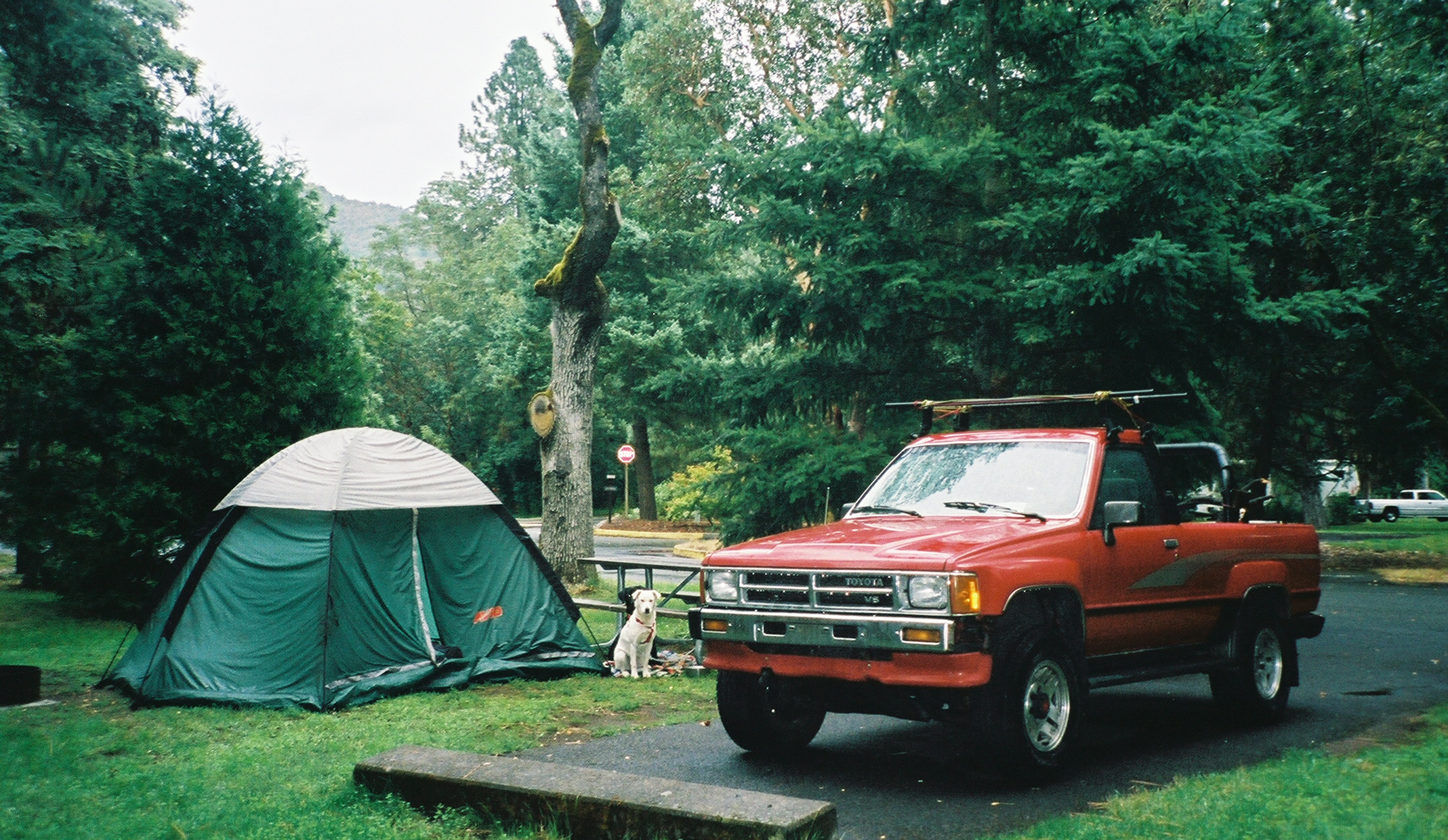
Campground in Valley of the Rogue State Park on the banks of the Rogue River adjacent to Interstate 5

According to the United States Census Bureau, the county has a total area of 2,802 square miles (7,260 km^{2}), of which 2,784 square miles (7,210 km^{2}) is land and 18 square miles (47 km^{2}) (0.6%) is water. A portion of the Umpqua National Forest is in Jackson County.

Located entirely within Jackson County is Bear Creek and its watershed, a tributary of the Rogue River. The population centers of Medford, Ashland, Phoenix, Talent, and Central Point are located along the stream. It connects with the Rogue River near the Upper and Lower Table Rock lava formations.

=== Summits ===
- Barneburg Hill
- Fredenburg Butte
- Obenchain Mountain
- Ropers Bunion

=== Adjacent counties ===
- Douglas County (north)
- Klamath County (east)
- Siskiyou County, California (south)
- Josephine County (west)

=== National protected areas ===
- Cascade–Siskiyou National Monument
- Crater Lake National Park (part)
- Klamath National Forest (part)
- Rogue River-Siskiyou National Forest (part)
- Umpqua National Forest (part)

=== Other landforms ===
- Schieffelin Gulch

== Demographics ==
Historical population
Census	Pop.	Note	%±
1860	3,736		—
1870	4,778		27.9%
1880	8,154		70.7%
1890	11,455		40.5%
1900	13,698		19.6%
1910	25,756		88.0%
1920	20,405		−20.8%
1930	32,918		61.3%
1940	36,213		10.0%
1950	58,510		61.6%
1960	73,962		26.4%
1970	94,533		27.8%
1980	132,456		40.1%
1990	146,389		10.5%
2000	181,269		23.8%
2010	203,206		12.1%
2020	223,259		9.9%
2025 (est.)	221,795	▼	−0.7%
U.S. Decennial Census; 1790–1960 1900–1990; 1990–2000 2010–2020

=== 2020 census ===
As of the 2020 census, the county had a population of 223,259. Of the residents, 20.3% were under the age of 18 and 23.3% were 65 years of age or older, and the median age was 43.1 years. For every 100 females there were 95.2 males, and for every 100 females age 18 and over there were 92.9 males; 79.4% of residents lived in urban areas and 20.6% lived in rural areas.

The racial makeup of the county was 79.8% White, 0.8% Black or African American, 1.2% American Indian and Alaska Native, 1.5% Asian, 0.4% Native Hawaiian and Pacific Islander, 5.3% from some other race, and 11.0% from two or more races. Hispanic or Latino residents of any race comprised 13.6% of the population.

There were 90,467 households in the county, of which 26.4% had children under the age of 18 living with them and 27.2% had a female householder with no spouse or partner present. About 27.9% of all households were made up of individuals and 14.9% had someone living alone who was 65 years of age or older.

There were 96,239 housing units, of which 6.0% were vacant. Among occupied housing units, 64.1% were owner-occupied and 35.9% were renter-occupied. The homeowner vacancy rate was 1.5% and the rental vacancy rate was 5.0%.

The table below summarizes the racial and ethnic composition reported in the 2020 Decennial Census Redistricting Data (Public Law 94-171).

Jackson County, Oregon – Racial and ethnic composition Note: the US Census treats Hispanic/Latino as an ethnic category. This table excludes Latinos from the racial categories and assigns them to a separate category. Hispanics/Latinos may be of any race.
Race / Ethnicity (NH = Non-Hispanic)	Pop 1980	Pop 1990	Pop 2000	Pop 2010	Pop 2020	% 1980	% 1990	% 2000	% 2010	% 2020
White alone (NH)	126,089	136,957	160,795	170,023	170,232	95.19%	93.56%	88.71%	83.67%	76.25%
Black or African American alone (NH)	163	319	674	1,227	1,574	0.12%	0.22%	0.37%	0.60%	0.71%
Native American or Alaska Native alone (NH)	1,189	1,722	1,782	1,874	1,775	0.90%	1.18%	0.98%	0.92%	0.80%
Asian alone (NH)	798	1,386	1,583	2,304	3,293	0.60%	0.95%	0.87%	1.13%	1.47%
Native Hawaiian or Pacific Islander alone (NH)	x	x	291	562	808	x	x	0.16%	0.28%	0.36%
Other race alone (NH)	263	56	198	229	1,496	0.20%	0.04%	0.11%	0.11%	0.67%
Mixed race or Multiracial (NH)	x	x	3,820	5,242	13,682	x	x	2.11%	2.58%	6.13%
Hispanic or Latino (any race)	3,954	5,949	12,126	21,745	30,399	2.99%	4.06%	6.69%	10.70%	13.62%
Total	132,456	146,389	181,269	203,206	223,259	100.00%	100.00%	100.00%	100.00%	100.00%

=== American Community Survey 2025 data ===
The United States Census Bureau estimated that in 2025, Jackson County’s population was 221.795. It was also estimated that the county's population was 74,99% Non-Hispanic White, 16,21% Hispanic or Latino, 0,84% Non-Hispanic Black, 1,70% Asian, 0,84% Native American, 0,37% Pacific Islander, and 5,05% Multiracial.

Total	Population	Percentage
Non-Hispanic White	166.318	74,99%
Hispanic or Latino	35.953	16,21%
Non-Hispanic Black	1.873	0,84%
Asian	3.771	1,70%
Native American	1.860	0,84%
Pacific Islander	822	0,37%
Non-Hispanic Multiracial	11.198	5,05%

=== 2010 census ===
As of the 2010 census, there were 203,206 people, 83,076 households, and 53,460 families living in the county. The population density was 73.0 inhabitants per square mile (28.2/km^{2}). There were 90,937 housing units at an average density of 32.7 units per square mile (12.6 units/km^{2}).

The racial makeup of the county was 88.7% white, 1.2% Asian, 1.2% American Indian, 0.7% black or African American, 0.3% Pacific islander, 4.5% from other races, and 3.5% from two or more races. Those of Hispanic or Latino origin made up 10.7% of the population. In terms of ancestry, 19.9% were German, 14.4% were English, 14.1% were Irish, and 5.3% were American.

Of the 83,076 households, 28.7% had children under the age of 18 living with them, 48.4% were married couples living together, 11.0% had a female householder with no husband present, 35.6% were non-families, and 27.7% of all households were made up of individuals. The average household size was 2.40 and the average family size was 2.91. The median age was 42.1 years.

The median income for a household in the county was $44,142 and the median income for a family was $53,739. Males had a median income of $40,435 versus $30,632 for females. The per capita income for the county was $24,410. About 9.9% of families and 14.0% of the population were below the poverty line, including 19.0% of those under age 18 and 7.4% of those age 65 or over.

=== 2000 census ===
As of the census of 2000, there were 181,269 people, 71,532 households, and 48,427 families living in the county. The population density was 65 people per square mile (25 people/km^{2}). There were 75,737 housing units at an average density of 27 units per square mile (10/km^{2}). The racial makeup of the county was 91.65% White, 0.40% Black or African American, 1.09% Native American, 0.90% Asian, 0.18% Pacific Islander, 2.88% from other races, and 2.91% from two or more races. 6.69% of the population were Hispanic or Latino of any race. 17.4% were of German, 12.9% English, 10.2% Irish and 8.8% United States or American ancestry. 92.7% spoke only English at home, while 5.6% spoke Spanish.

Of the 71,532 households, 30.30% had children under the age of 18 living with them, 53.20% were married couples living together, 10.50% had a female householder with no husband present, and 32.30% were non-families. 25.10% of all households were made up of one individual, 11.00% being a person who was 65 years of age or older. The average household size was 2.48 and the average family size was 2.95.

The age distribution of the county's population was 24.40% under the age of 18, 8.70% from 18 to 24, 25.50% from 25 to 44, 25.40% from 45 to 64, and 16.00% 65 years of age or older. The median age was 39 years. For every 100 females there were 94.60 males. For every 100 females age 18 and over, there were 91.70 males.

The median income for a household in the county was $36,461, and the median income for a family was $43,675. Males had a median income of $32,720 compared to $23,690 for females. The per capita income for the county was $19,498. 8.90% of families and 12.50% of the population were below the poverty line, including 16.30% of those under age 18 and 6.90% of those age 65 or over.

== Communities ==
=== Cities ===
- Ashland
- Butte Falls
- Central Point
- Eagle Point
- Gold Hill
- Jacksonville
- Medford (county seat)
- Phoenix
- Rogue River
- Shady Cove
- Talent

=== Census-designated places ===
- Foots Creek
- Prospect
- Ruch
- Trail
- White City
- Wimer

=== Unincorporated communities ===
- Applegate
- Beagle
- Bitter Lick
- Brownsboro
- Buckhorn Springs
- Buncom
- Cascade Gorge
- Climax
- Colestin
- Dardanelles
- Four Corners
- Lake Creek
- Lincoln
- McKee Bridge
- McLeod
- Mountain View
- Pinehurst
- Provolt
- Rock Point
- Rogue Elk
- Sams Valley
- Seven Oaks
- Starvation Heights
- Steamboat
- Table Rock
- Tolo
- Union Creek

=== Former communities ===
- Copper
- Persist

== Politics ==
As is typical of southwestern Oregon, Jackson County leans towards the Republican nominee in presidential elections, although the presence of a substantial student body at Ashland means Democrats get a larger proportion of the vote in statewide elections than in any other county south of the Willamette Valley. No Democratic presidential candidate has won an absolute majority in Jackson County since Lyndon Johnson's landslide in 1964, although Bill Clinton in 1992 and Barack Obama in 2008 obtained narrow pluralities in the county, in both cases by less than 500 votes. In recent elections, however, the Republican lean in Jackson County has presented some signs of waning. The four most recent instances in which Republicans have been able to win the county had them doing so only by single digit margins.

In the United States House of Representatives, Jackson County lies within Oregon's 2nd congressional district, which has a Cook Partisan Voting Index of R+11 and is represented by Republican Cliff Bentz. In the Oregon House of Representatives, Jackson County is divided between four districts, which are together represented by three Republicans and one Democrat (Pam Marsh of Ashland). In the Oregon State Senate, Jackson County is divided between three districts; the 2nd and 28th Districts, represented by Republicans Art Robinson and Dennis Linthicum, and the 3rd District, represented by Democrat Jeff Golden.

Jackson County is currently one of 11 counties in Oregon in which therapeutic psilocybin is legal.

United States presidential election results for Jackson County, Oregon
Year	Republican		Democratic		Third party(ies)	
Year	No.	%	No.	%	No.	%
1880	743	41.03%	1,065	58.81%	3	0.17%
1884	947	41.61%	1,251	54.96%	78	3.43%
1888	1,181	45.81%	1,320	51.20%	77	2.99%
1892	959	35.04%	466	17.03%	1,312	47.94%
1896	1,387	36.62%	2,354	62.14%	47	1.24%
1900	1,565	48.08%	1,525	46.85%	165	5.07%
1904	1,992	61.16%	798	24.50%	467	14.34%
1908	2,032	50.09%	1,537	37.89%	488	12.03%
1912	847	16.15%	2,079	39.65%	2,317	44.19%
1916	3,538	39.41%	4,874	54.29%	566	6.30%
1920	4,382	59.81%	2,503	34.17%	441	6.02%
1924	4,868	53.25%	1,840	20.13%	2,433	26.62%
1928	8,053	75.43%	2,463	23.07%	160	1.50%
1932	5,459	40.02%	7,519	55.13%	661	4.85%
1936	4,866	34.97%	7,520	54.05%	1,528	10.98%
1940	8,507	55.46%	6,754	44.03%	78	0.51%
1944	8,598	55.74%	6,668	43.23%	160	1.04%
1948	11,226	58.86%	7,342	38.50%	504	2.64%
1952	18,279	67.55%	8,674	32.05%	107	0.40%
1956	17,201	57.46%	12,733	42.54%	0	0.00%
1960	17,554	54.59%	14,531	45.19%	72	0.22%
1964	14,598	42.83%	19,486	57.17%	0	0.00%
1968	19,577	56.19%	12,714	36.49%	2,551	7.32%
1972	24,003	57.75%	14,529	34.96%	3,029	7.29%
1976	24,237	48.25%	23,384	46.55%	2,615	5.21%
1980	32,879	55.97%	19,903	33.88%	5,958	10.14%
1984	37,895	61.76%	23,230	37.86%	234	0.38%
1988	32,516	52.52%	28,028	45.27%	1,368	2.21%
1992	28,704	37.23%	29,146	37.80%	19,246	24.96%
1996	33,771	45.86%	29,230	39.69%	10,646	14.46%
2000	46,052	54.31%	33,153	39.10%	5,591	6.59%
2004	56,519	55.31%	44,366	43.42%	1,304	1.28%
2008	49,043	48.53%	49,090	48.58%	2,914	2.88%
2012	49,020	50.47%	44,468	45.78%	3,639	3.75%
2016	53,870	49.27%	44,447	40.66%	11,010	10.07%
2020	63,869	50.23%	59,478	46.77%	3,818	3.00%
2024	61,743	51.64%	54,065	45.22%	3,764	3.15%

== Economy ==
The county's principal industries are healthcare, agriculture, lumber, manufacturing, and tourism.

Jackson County has over 10,000 acres (40 km^{2}) of orchards and shares with Josephine County the Rogue Valley and Applegate wine appellations.

Soapstone, a substance used in art sculpture, is mined in Jackson County.

According to the Jackson County Board of Commissioners, by 2021 the main cash crop produced within the county was grows of illegal cannabis, with the board declaring a state of emergency.

== Points of interest ==
=== Bear Creek Greenway ===
The Bear Creek Greenway is the area on both sides of Bear Creek running from Ashland to Central Point. The Greenway's most popular feature is the bike path which runs from Ashland north towards Medford. Eventually it will be a 21-mile (34 km) paved link between Ashland and Central Point. The bike path is very popular with cyclists and skaters, especially during the warmer spring and summer months.

=== Bigfoot trap ===
What is believed to be the world's only Bigfoot trap is located in the Siskiyou National Forest in the southern part of the county. The trap was originally built in 1974 by the North American Wildlife Research Team (NAWRT), a now-defunct organization based in Eugene, Oregon, to capture the legendary hominid Bigfoot (or Sasquatch) that is said to inhabit the forests of the Pacific Northwest. In recent years it has become a major tourist attraction.

=== Oregon Vortex ===
The Oregon Vortex is a roadside attraction that opened to tourists in 1930, located on Sardine Creek in Gold Hill. It consists of a number of interesting effects, which are gravity hill optical illusions, but which the attraction's proprietors propose are the result of paranormal properties of the area.

The attraction was the inspiration for the Mystery Shack, a fictional tourist trap and the main setting for the Disney Channel (later Disney XD) original series Gravity Falls.

=== Pacific Crest Trail ===
The Pacific Crest Trail, officially designated as the Pacific Crest National Scenic Trail (PCT), passes through Jackson County.

== See also ==
- Beekman Native Plant Arboretum
- Britt Festival
- Mail Tribune
- National Fish and Wildlife Forensics Laboratory
- National Register of Historic Places listings in Jackson County, Oregon
- Oregon Shakespeare Festival
- Southern Oregon Land Conservancy
- Southern Oregon University
- Southern Oregon Speedway
- Medford School District
- Ashland School District
