= Dardanelles, Oregon =

Unincorporated community in the state of Oregon, United States

- Unincorporated community
- Location within Oregon Location within the United States
- Coordinates: 42°25′44″N 123°03′29″W
- Country: United States
- State: Oregon
- County: Jackson
- Elevation: 1,066 ft (325 m)
- Time zone: UTC−08:00 (Pacific (PST))
  - Summer (DST): UTC−07:00 (PDT)
- GNIS feature ID: 1159044
- Coordinates and elevation from Geographic Names Information System

Dardanelles is an unincorporated community in Jackson County, Oregon, United States. It lies opposite the city of Gold Hill on the south side of the Rogue River. Interstate 5 and Oregon Route 99 pass by Gold Hill and Dardanelles.

William G. T'Vault, who founded the community in the 1850s, chose the name apparently because the river here runs through a narrow stretch between hills and may have reminded him of the Dardanelles between Asia and Europe. T'Vault was the first postmaster of a post office established here in 1852 and which operated intermittently until 1878. Although a place of importance in early Oregon, little of the community remains. Author Ralph Friedman says in In Search of Western Oregon, "Today most people in Gold Hill know of Dardanelles only because a [local] service station bears that name."
