= Lincoln, Jackson County, Oregon =

Unincorporated community in the state of Oregon, United States

- Unincorporated community
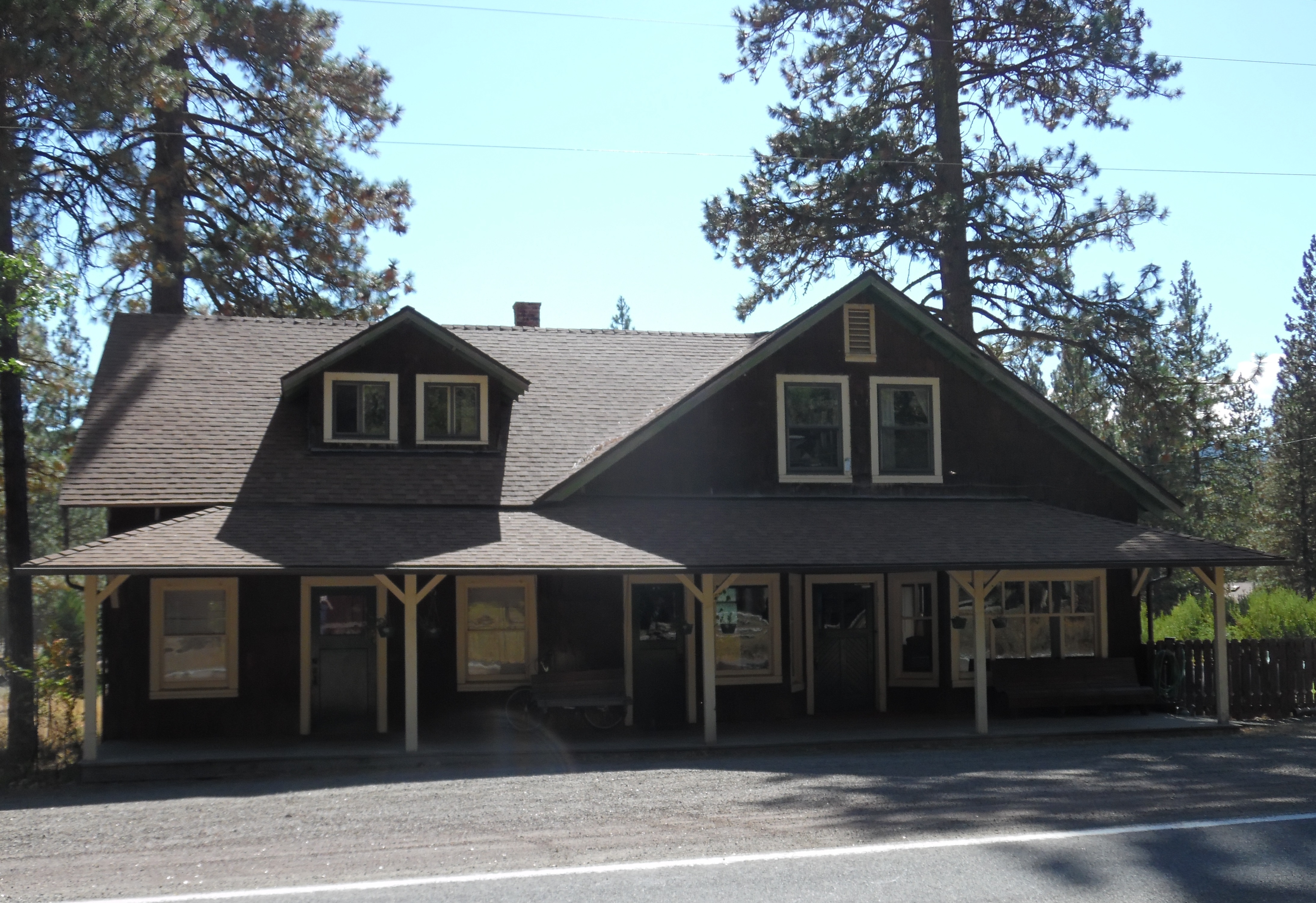
- Community building along Oregon Route 66

- Location within Oregon Location within the United States
- Coordinates: 42°06′31″N 122°24′11″W
- Country: United States
- State: Oregon
- County: Jackson
- Elevation: 3,701 ft (1,128 m)
- Time zone: UTC-8 (Pacific (PST))
  - Summer (DST): UTC-7 (PDT)
- GNIS feature ID: 1136478
- Coordinates and elevation from Geographic Names Information System

Lincoln is an unincorporated community in Jackson County, Oregon, United States. It lies along Oregon Route 66 (Greens Springs Highway) between Ashland and Klamath Falls in the Siskiyou Mountains near Pinehurst. It is within the boundaries of the Cascade–Siskiyou National Monument.

Oregon Geographic Names, citing an article in the Medford Mail-Tribune of September 29, 1929, says that Lincoln was named for Lincoln, New Hampshire, by a family whose surname was Henry. The family, formerly operating in New England, owned a lumber mill in Lincoln.
