= Fredenburg Butte =

Mountain in Oregon, United States

Coordinates: 42°35′02″N 122°32′52″W

Fredenburg Butte is a summit in the U.S. state of Oregon. The elevation is 4,298 feet (1,310 m).

Fredenburg Butte was named in the 1870s after one Francis M. Fredenburg.
