= Schieffelin Gulch =

Valley in the United States

Coordinates: 42°24′49″N 123°09′56″W

Schieffelin Gulch is a valley in the U.S. state of Oregon.

Schieffelin Gulch was named in 1895 after one Clinton Schieffelin.
