= Ropers Bunion =

Coordinates: 42°11′07″N 122°43′16″W

Ropers Bunion is a summit in the U.S. state of Oregon. The elevation is 2,090 feet (640 m).

Ropers Bunion was named after Fordyce Roper, a local industrialist.
