= Obenchain Mountain =

Mountain in Oregon, United States

Coordinates: 42.54080°N 122.67096°W

Obenchain Mountain is a summit in the U.S. state of Oregon. The elevation is 3,609 feet (1,100 m).

Obenchain Mountain was named in 1864 after One John Obenchain.
