= Valley of the Rogue State Park =

State park in Oregon, United States

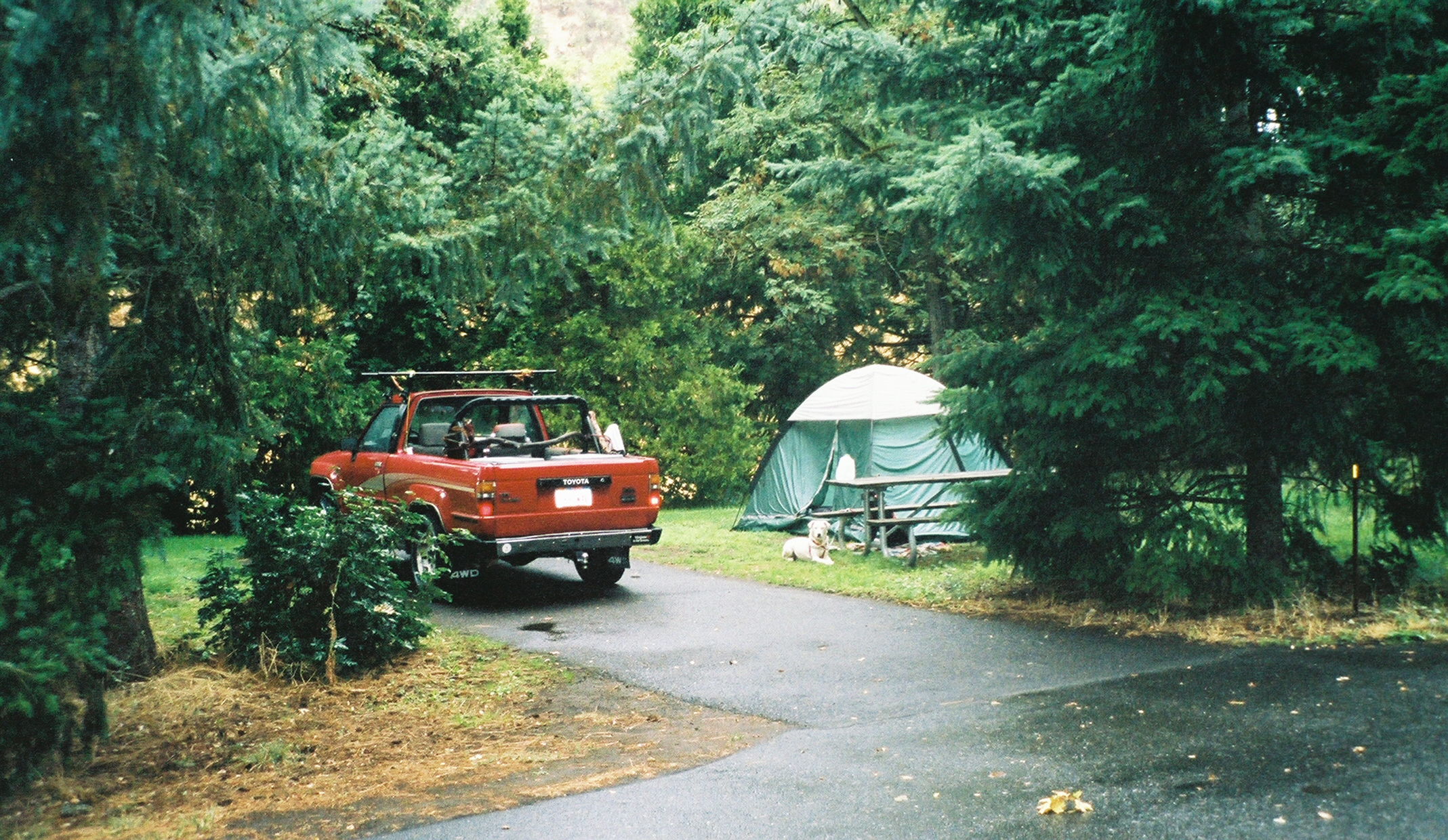
- A campsite in the park in September 2005

- Location within Oregon Location within the United States
- Type: Public, state
- Location: Jackson County, Oregon
- Nearest city: Grants Pass
- Coordinates: 42°24′39″N 123°08′59″W
- Elevation: 1,050 ft.
- Operator: Oregon Parks and Recreation Department

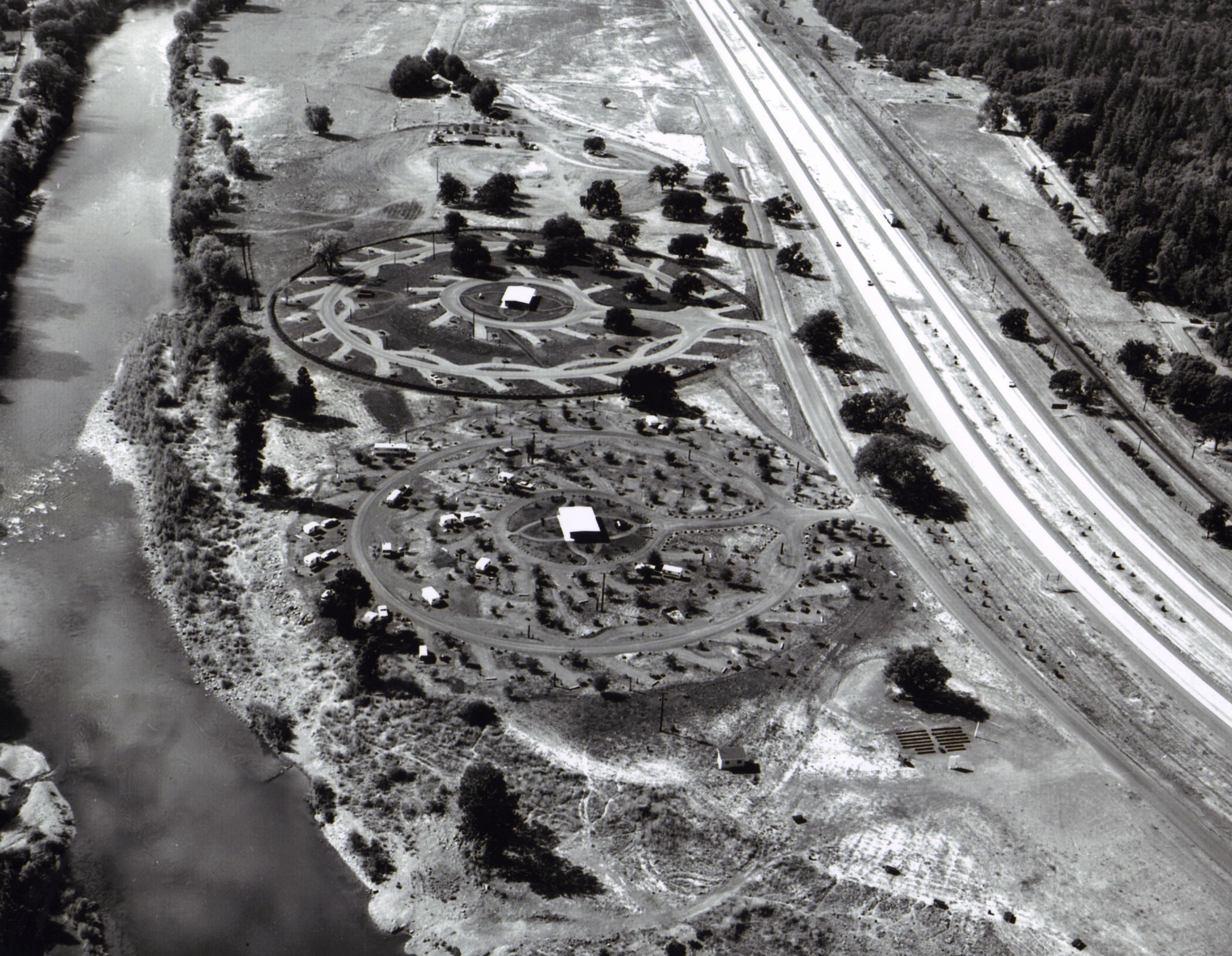
The park next to Interstate 5, 1966

Valley of the Rogue State Park is a state park in west central Jackson County, Oregon, near Grants Pass and Medford, and is administered by the Oregon Parks and Recreation Department. It lies along the banks of the Rogue River, adjacent to Interstate 5. The park offers a year-round, full-service campground, a nature trail, a day-use area, and river access for boating, fishing, and swimming.

== Climate ==
Climate data for Valley of the Rogue State Park
Month	Jan	Feb	Mar	Apr	May	Jun	Jul	Aug	Sep	Oct	Nov	Dec	Year
Record high °F (°C)	69 (21)	76 (24)	84 (29)	94 (34)	102 (39)	111 (44)	114 (46)	108 (42)	108 (42)	98 (37)	77 (25)	68 (20)	114 (46)
Mean daily maximum °F (°C)	47 (8)	53 (12)	59 (15)	64 (18)	72 (22)	80 (27)	89 (32)	89 (32)	82 (28)	69 (21)	52 (11)	44 (7)	67 (19)
Mean daily minimum °F (°C)	35 (2)	36 (2)	37 (3)	40 (4)	45 (7)	50 (10)	55 (13)	54 (12)	47 (8)	41 (5)	39 (4)	35 (2)	43 (6)
Record low °F (°C)	1 (−17)	5 (−15)	18 (−8)	24 (−4)	26 (−3)	30 (−1)	37 (3)	30 (−1)	27 (−3)	19 (−7)	12 (−11)	−1 (−18)	−1 (−18)
Average precipitation inches (mm)	4.77 (121)	4.09 (104)	3.38 (86)	2.12 (54)	1.36 (35)	0.68 (17)	0.32 (8.1)	0.30 (7.6)	0.64 (16)	1.93 (49)	5.04 (128)	6.49 (165)	31.12 (790.7)
Average snowfall inches (cm)	0.30 (0.76)	0.20 (0.51)	0.10 (0.25)	0 (0)	0 (0)	0 (0)	0 (0)	0 (0)	0 (0)	0 (0)	0.10 (0.25)	0.80 (2.0)	1.50 (3.8)

== See also ==
- List of Oregon State Parks
