= Barneburg Hill =

Mountain in Oregon, United States

Coordinates: 42°18′27″N 122°50′19″W

Barneburg Hill is a summit in the U.S. state of Oregon. The elevation is 1,713 feet (522 m).

Barneburg Hill was named for the local Barneburg family.
