= Prospect State Scenic Viewpoint =

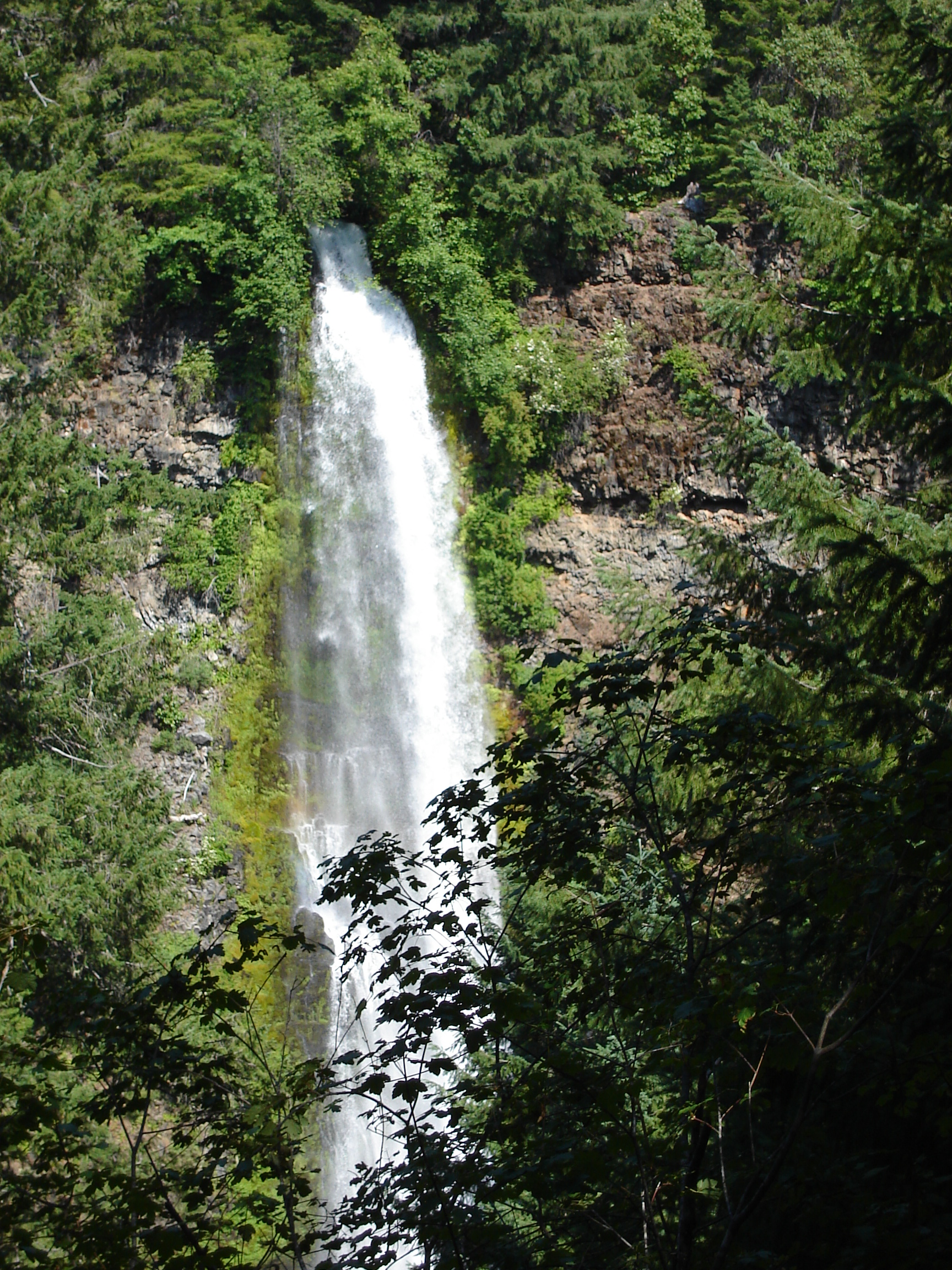
- Mill Creek Falls
- Interactive map of Prospect State Scenic Viewpoint
- Location: Prospect, Oregon
- Coordinates: 42.7378°N 122.4954°W
- Type: Plunge
- Total height: 173 ft (53 m)
- Number of drops: 1
- Average flow rate: 100 cu ft/s (3 m^{3}/s)

Prospect State Scenic Viewpoint, is a state park south of the community of Prospect on Oregon Route 62 in Jackson County, in the U.S. state of Oregon. It was formerly known as Mill Creek Falls Scenic Area, a private hiking area that was developed by Willamette Industries along the Rogue River. Both Mill Creek Falls and Pearsony Falls are contained within the area, with Barr Creek Falls close by.

A hydroelectric dam was built in the 1920s which drained the narrow valley containing the group of falls. A group of large boulders appeared. These have become a local attraction known as the Avenue of the Giant Boulders.

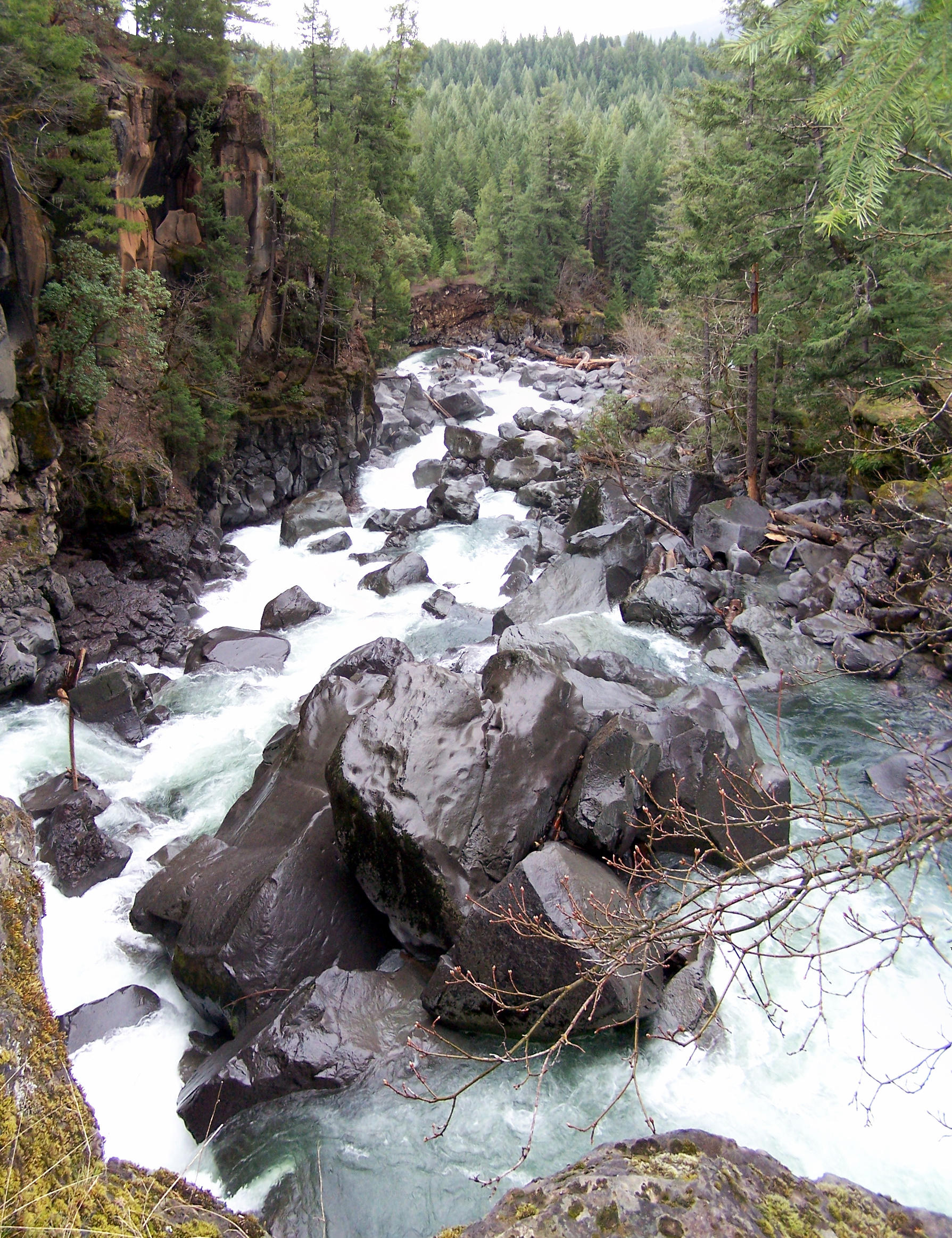
Avenue of the Giant Boulders

== Mill Creek Falls ==
The Mill Creek Falls is the centerpiece attraction within the Mill Creek Scenic Area. A trailhead developed by Boise Cascade ends on a fork that leads to the Avenue of Boulders to the left and Mill Creek Falls and Barr Creek Falls to the right. The waterfall totals 173 feet high on Mill Creek shortly before it meets the Rogue River, and is one of the tallest cascades in Oregon. Mill Creek has low sinuosity, and has a gently sloping terrain. Yet, it flows through unstable banks which produce large amounts of sediment. Historically, the Mill Creek Falls area has moderate to frequent fires, primarily from lightning, having been entirely burned at least once in the past. For this reason it is common to see charred trees and snags surrounding the waterfall area.

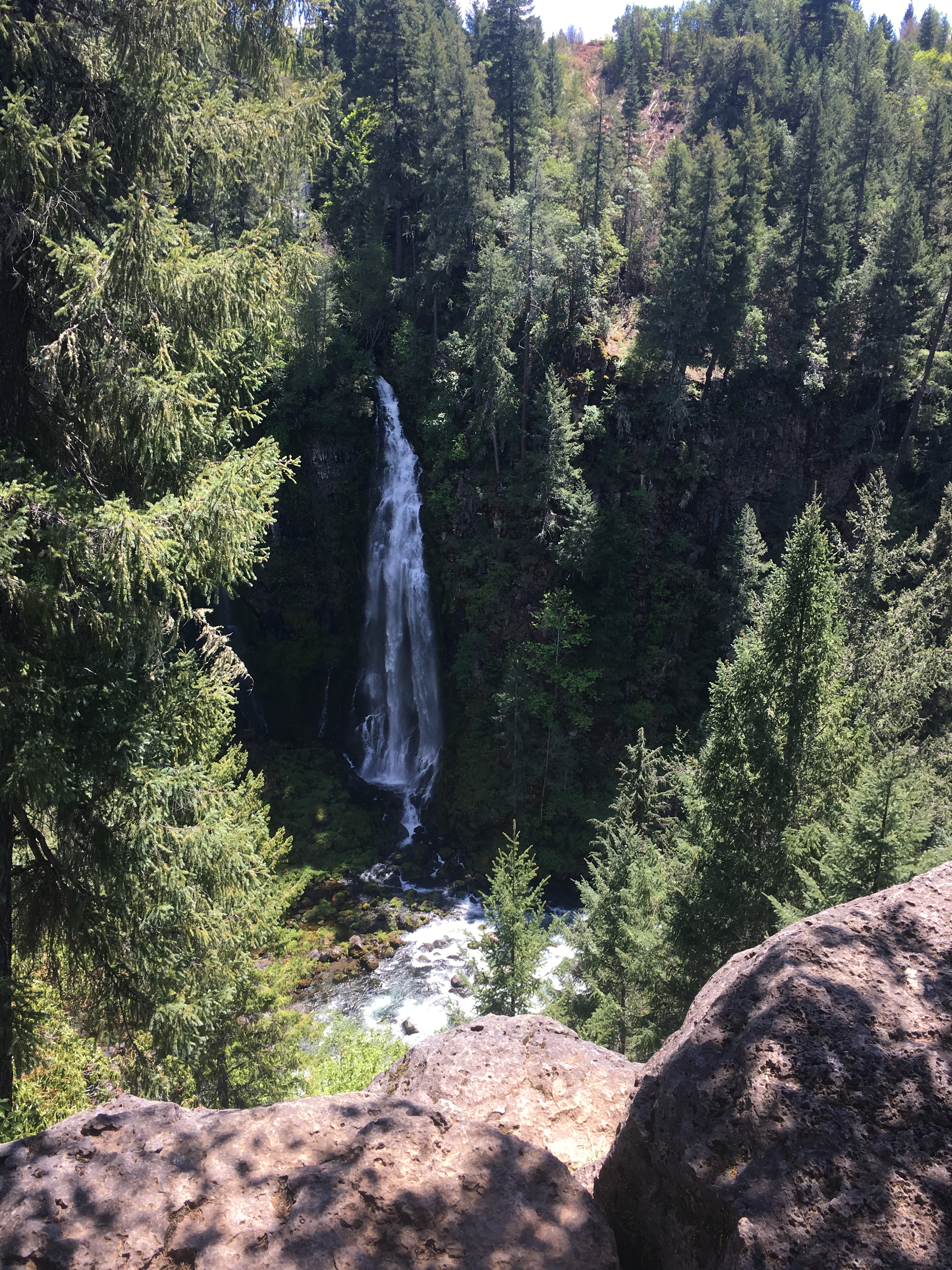
Barr Creek Falls in May

== Barr Creek Falls ==
Along Mill Creek Falls, the trailhead is Barr Creek Falls, a three-drop waterfall known as Bear Creek Falls. [8] It totals 240 feet of fall in three drops, the tallest and last drop is 150 feet. The name comes from the presence of a cattle bar next to the waterfall to prevent cattle from straying out of the boundaries of private ranches that neighbor the river.

== See also ==
- List of waterfalls in Oregon
