= Prospect, Oregon =

Unincorporated community in the state of Oregon, United States

- Census-designated place
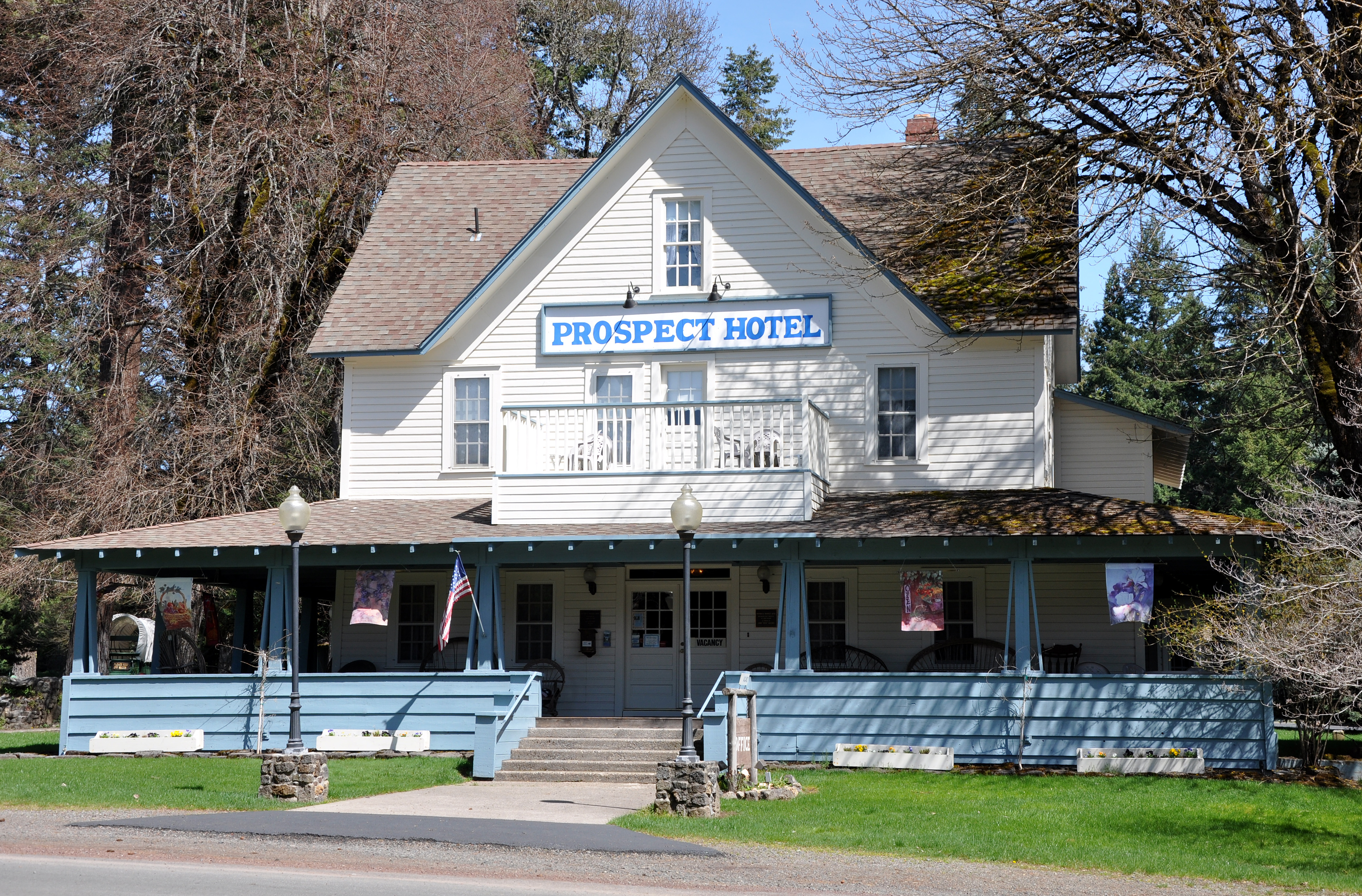
- Prospect Hotel

- Location within Oregon Location within the United States
- Coordinates: 42°45′12″N 122°29′16″W
- Country: United States
- State: Oregon
- County: Jackson

Area
  - Total: 3.50 sq mi (9.07 km^{2})
  - Land: 3.50 sq mi (9.07 km^{2})
  - Water: 0.0039 sq mi (0.01 km^{2})
- Elevation: 2,605 ft (794 m)

Population (2020)
  - Total: 449
  - Density: 128.3/sq mi (49.52/km^{2})
- Time zone: UTC-8 (Pacific (PST))
  - Summer (DST): UTC-7 (PDT)
- ZIP code: 97536
- FIPS code: 41-60100
- GNIS feature ID: 2611775

Prospect is an unincorporated community and census-designated place (CDP) in Jackson County, in the U.S. state of Oregon. It lies along Oregon Route 62 on the Rogue River, in the Rogue River – Siskiyou National Forest. As of the 2020 census it had a population of 449.

== History ==
Historical population
Census	Pop.	Note	%±
1930	125		—
1940	125		0.0%
1950	500		300.0%
1960	500		0.0%
1970	200		−60.0%
1980	1,200		500.0%
1990	1,200		0.0%
2010	455		—
2020	449		−1.3%

Prospect began as a logging town; its first sawmill began operating in 1870. Prospect had a post office established in 1882 that was first named "Deskins" after the first postmaster. In 1888, there was a mill named Deskins Sawmill. The name of the community was changed to "Prospect" in 1889 because of plans made to run a railroad up the Rogue River, which would ostensibly improve the community's prospects.

The Prospect Hotel, which opened in 1892, was listed in the National Register of Historic Places in 1980.

== Local events and sites of interest ==
On the Saturday of Memorial Day weekend, Prospect holds the Mill Creek Memorial festival. It honors veterans with a parade, a flag retirement ceremony, live music and games for children. All the proceeds go to a fund to help veterans.

In July Prospect hosts an airplane "fly-in" that helps support the Jackson County Search and Rescue, and in August a jamboree and timber carnival (a festival that includes lumberjack contests such as log rolling) are held.

On the last weekend in September, Prospect hosts Music in the Mountains, a two-day festival of bluegrass, country, folk and Americana music on the grounds of the Prospect Hotel.

Prospect is the site of Prospect State Airport (FAA LID: 64S), which has one asphalt runway. It is used for general aviation operations, totaling about 1200 annual movements. The Prospect State Scenic Viewpoint is nearby.

== Climate ==
This region experiences warm (but not hot) and dry summers, with no average monthly temperatures above 71.6 °F (22.0 °C). According to the Köppen Climate Classification system, Prospect has a warm-summer Mediterranean climate, abbreviated "Csb" on climate maps.

Climate data for Prospect, Oregon (1991–2020 normals, extremes 1905–present)
Month	Jan	Feb	Mar	Apr	May	Jun	Jul	Aug	Sep	Oct	Nov	Dec	Year
Record high °F (°C)	73 (23)	76 (24)	88 (31)	95 (35)	102 (39)	109 (43)	107 (42)	110 (43)	106 (41)	98 (37)	82 (28)	71 (22)	110 (43)
Mean daily maximum °F (°C)	50.0 (10.0)	53.6 (12.0)	57.9 (14.4)	62.4 (16.9)	71.0 (21.7)	77.9 (25.5)	88.7 (31.5)	89.3 (31.8)	83.5 (28.6)	70.4 (21.3)	54.7 (12.6)	47.6 (8.7)	67.2 (19.6)
Daily mean °F (°C)	40.1 (4.5)	42.2 (5.7)	45.2 (7.3)	48.7 (9.3)	55.9 (13.3)	61.5 (16.4)	69.5 (20.8)	69.3 (20.7)	63.6 (17.6)	54.0 (12.2)	44.1 (6.7)	38.8 (3.8)	52.7 (11.5)
Mean daily minimum °F (°C)	30.2 (−1.0)	30.8 (−0.7)	32.6 (0.3)	35.0 (1.7)	40.7 (4.8)	45.1 (7.3)	50.3 (10.2)	49.2 (9.6)	43.7 (6.5)	37.5 (3.1)	33.5 (0.8)	29.9 (−1.2)	38.2 (3.4)
Record low °F (°C)	−12 (−24)	−2 (−19)	5 (−15)	17 (−8)	20 (−7)	27 (−3)	30 (−1)	27 (−3)	20 (−7)	12 (−11)	2 (−17)	−8 (−22)	−12 (−24)
Average precipitation inches (mm)	5.97 (152)	4.42 (112)	4.38 (111)	3.71 (94)	2.59 (66)	1.27 (32)	0.57 (14)	0.47 (12)	1.16 (29)	3.25 (83)	6.31 (160)	7.20 (183)	41.30 (1,049)
Average snowfall inches (cm)	7.6 (19)	3.1 (7.9)	2.3 (5.8)	1.0 (2.5)	0.0 (0.0)	0.0 (0.0)	0.0 (0.0)	0.0 (0.0)	0.0 (0.0)	0.0 (0.0)	2.9 (7.4)	4.0 (10)	20.9 (53)
Average precipitation days (≥ 0.01 in)	16.4	14.4	16.0	14.9	10.8	5.1	2.4	2.0	3.8	9.0	17.3	17.3	129.4
Average snowy days (≥ 0.1 in)	2.9	1.6	0.9	0.5	0.0	0.0	0.0	0.0	0.0	0.0	0.9	2.2	9.0
Source: NOAA
