= Gold Hill, Oregon =

City in Jackson County, Oregon, United States

- City
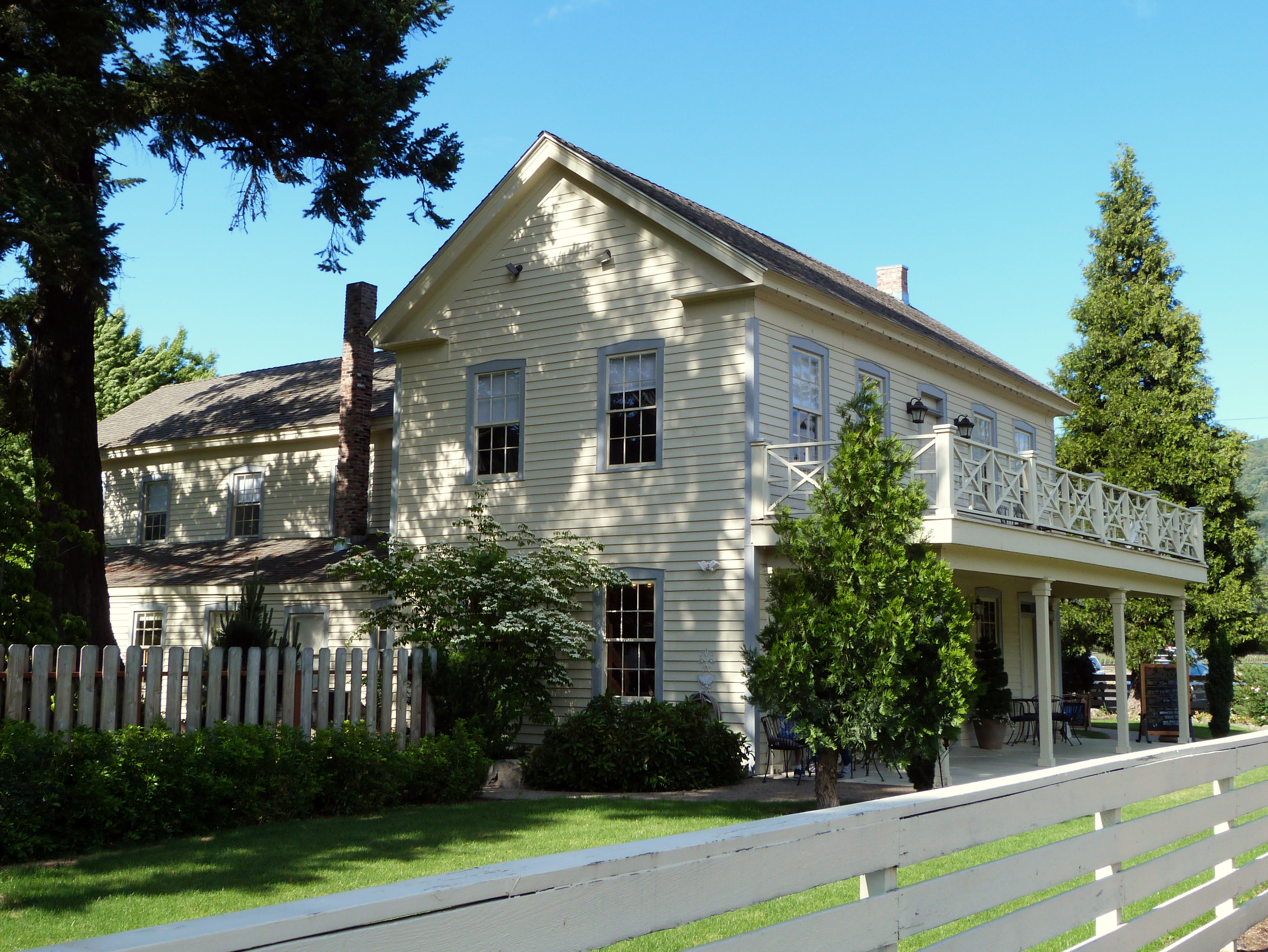
- Rock Point Hotel, Gold Hill

- Location in Oregon
- Coordinates: 42°26′1″N 123°3′16″W
- Country: United States
- State: Oregon
- County: Jackson
- Incorporated: 1895

Area
  - Total: 0.76 sq mi (1.97 km^{2})
  - Land: 0.76 sq mi (1.97 km^{2})
  - Water: 0 sq mi (0.00 km^{2})
- Elevation: 1,085 ft (330.7 m)

Population (2020)
  - Total: 1,335
  - Density: 1,752.8/sq mi (676.77/km^{2})
- Time zone: UTC-8 (Pacific)
  - Summer (DST): UTC-7 (Pacific)
- ZIP code: 97525
- Area code: 541
- FIPS code: 41-29950
- GNIS feature ID: 2410610
- Website: www.cityofgoldhill.gov

Gold Hill is a city in Jackson County, Oregon, in the United States. As of the 2020 census, Gold Hill had a population of 1,335. It is along a bend of the Rogue River.

== History ==
The city's name comes from a nearby hill that was the location of a 19th-century gold discovery, on "Big Bar” on the Rogue River in the early 1850s. In 1852, Colonel William T'Vault and family made a claim, naming it Dardanelles, on the south side of the Rogue. Gold Hill became a boomtown overnight after time it became well known as pocket gold county. Seasoned prospectors specialized in placer mining from rivers, creeks, and streams. Gold Hill became world famous for its production of cement from area limestone deposits.

== Geography ==
According to the United States Census Bureau, the city has a total area of 0.77 square miles (1.99 km^{2}), all of it land.

Gold Hill lies east of the city of Rogue River and northwest of Central Point and Medford along Interstate 5 and Oregon Route 99 in the Rogue River Valley. Gold Hill is connected to Shady Cove to the northeast by Oregon Route 234.

== Demographics ==
Historical population
Census	Pop.	Note	%±
1900	385		—
1920	422		—
1930	502		19.0%
1950	619		—
1960	608		−1.8%
1970	603		−0.8%
1980	904		49.9%
1990	964		6.6%
2000	1,073		11.3%
2010	1,220		13.7%
2020	1,335		9.4%
U.S. Decennial Census

=== 2020 census ===
As of the 2020 census, Gold Hill had a population of 1,335. The median age was 41.7 years. 20.1% of residents were under the age of 18 and 20.7% of residents were 65 years of age or older. For every 100 females there were 102.9 males, and for every 100 females age 18 and over there were 96.7 males age 18 and over.

94.4% of residents lived in urban areas, while 5.6% lived in rural areas.

There were 543 households in Gold Hill, of which 28.7% had children under the age of 18 living in them. Of all households, 42.4% were married-couple households, 20.1% were households with a male householder and no spouse or partner present, and 28.2% were households with a female householder and no spouse or partner present. About 24.4% of all households were made up of individuals and 12.2% had someone living alone who was 65 years of age or older.

There were 578 housing units, of which 6.1% were vacant. Among occupied housing units, 69.2% were owner-occupied and 30.8% were renter-occupied. The homeowner vacancy rate was 0.5% and the rental vacancy rate was 5.6%.

Racial composition as of the 2020 census
Race	Number	Percent
White	1,174	87.9%
Black or African American	6	0.4%
American Indian and Alaska Native	31	2.3%
Asian	8	0.6%
Native Hawaiian and Other Pacific Islander	1	0.1%
Some other race	14	1.0%
Two or more races	101	7.6%
Hispanic or Latino (of any race)	69	5.2%

=== 2010 census ===
As of the census of 2010, there were 1,220 people, 509 households, and 336 families living in the city. The population density was 1,584.4 inhabitants per square mile (611.7/km^{2}). There were 552 housing units, at an average density of 716.9 units per square mile (276.8 units/km^{2}). The racial makeup of the city was 93.5% White, 0.2% African American, 1.6% Native American, 0.5% Asian, 0.7% from other races, and 3.6% from two or more races. Hispanic or Latino of any race were 2.7% of the population.

There were 509 households, of which 27.3% had children under the age of 18 living with them, 46.4% were married couples living together, 12.4% had a female householder with no husband, 7.3% had a male householder with no wife, and 34.0% were non-families. 25.7% of all households were made up of individuals, and 8.6% had someone living alone who was 65 years of age or older. The average household size was 2.40 and the average family size was 2.83.

The median age in the city was 43.9 years. 19.5% of residents were under the age of 18; 8.8% were between the ages of 18 and 24; 23.1% were from 25 to 44; 34.2% were from 45 to 64; and 14.4% were 65 years of age or older. The gender makeup of the city was 50.1% male and 49.9% female.

=== 2000 census ===
As of the census of 2000, there were 1,073 people, 419 households, and 294 families living in the city. The population density was 1,543.5 inhabitants per square mile (595.9/km^{2}). There were 446 housing units at an average density of 641.6 units per square mile (247.7 units/km^{2}). The racial makeup of the city was 96.09% White, 0.09% African American, 1.96% Native American, 0.09% Asian, 0.09% Pacific Islander, 0.28% from other races, and 1.40% from two or more races. Hispanic or Latino of any race were 3.36% of the population.

There were 419 households, out of which 35.8% had children under the age of 18 living with them, 49.6% were married couples living together, 14.6% had a female householder with no husband, and 29.8% were non-families. 23.9% of all households were made up of individuals, and 8.8% had someone living alone who was 65 years of age or older. The average household size was 2.56 and the average family size was 2.95.

In the city, the population had 28.3% under the age of 18, 7.0% from 18 to 24, 27.4% from 25 to 44, 25.9% from 45 to 64, and 11.4% who were 65 years of age or older. The median age was 37 years. For every 100 females, there were 91.3 males. For every 100 females age 18 and over, there were 89.9 males.

The median income for a household in the city was $32,500, and the median income for a family was $35,438. Males had a median income of $33,625 versus $23,036 for females. The per capita income for the city was $16,856. About 10.3% of families and 12.5% of the population were below the poverty line, including 15.3% of those under age 18 and 6.4% of those age 65 or over.

== Museums and other points of interest ==
Gold Hill is home to the Oregon Vortex, a roadside attraction. North of Gold Hill is Nugget Falls, a popular destination for whitewater kayaking.

The Gold Hill Historical Society maintains a free museum in the 1901 Beeman–Martin House that is open Thursday through Saturday. The museum collection includes mining equipment, a stamp mill known as the Lucky Bart Stamp Mill (Owner, President - Bartholomew Signorritti - hence the name) Lucky Bart. He was also owner of the Lucky Bart Mining Company in Sacramento, California. The stamp mill was built by Union Iron Works of San Francisco, California (1892) The stamp mill was purchased then shipped to for the Lucky Bart Mining Company of Sacramento to Gold Hill in the spring of 1893. Morton Lindley became president for the company Scientific press
