= Rogue River, Oregon =

- City
- Location in Oregon
- Coordinates: 42°26′08″N 123°10′06″W
- Country: United States
- State: Oregon
- County: Jackson
- Incorporated: 1912

Area
  - Total: 0.97 sq mi (2.50 km^{2})
  - Land: 0.97 sq mi (2.50 km^{2})
  - Water: 0 sq mi (0.00 km^{2})
- Elevation: 1,017 ft (310 m)

Population (2020)
  - Total: 2,407
  - Density: 2,495.6/sq mi (963.54/km^{2})
- Time zone: UTC−08:00 (Pacific)
  - Summer (DST): UTC−07:00 (Pacific)
- ZIP Code: 97537
- Area code: 541
- FIPS code: 41-63450
- GNIS feature ID: 2410984
- Website: www.cityofrogueriver.org

Rogue River is a city in Jackson County, Oregon, United States. As of the 2020 census the population was 2,407.

== History ==
In the early days the gold seekers forded the Rogue River, and during high water they swam across by holding the tails of their horses. Thus the river crossing near the present City of Rogue River, became known as Tailholt.

About 1850 or 51, Davis Evans built a ferry and two cabins at the mouth of Evans Creek. From there a trail was made by the mules of the pack trains that freighted supplies to the gold mines. According to John Breeding, who later freight supplies over the trail on mules and in carts made from the front wheels of wagons, the trail led up Evans Creek, then cut across to Ditch Creek where it passed the hewed log house of the old Burkhart ranch, and ran along the field and over the mountain gap to Jump-Off Joe Creek. A few log cabins, widely scattered over the area marked the locations of the early settlers' homesteads and mining claims.

In 1868, according to an old newspaper clipping, a covered bridge was built beside the big live oak tree near the ferry, for the stage road crossing of Evans Creek. Samuel A. Steckel furnished timbers to repair the bridge in 1883. When it was dismantled in 1912 some of the timbers, 80 feet in length, were so well preserved they were saved for use in the bridge eight miles up the creek.

In 1872, John Woods settled on the East side of Evans Creek, and soon the town of Woodville was built. The lumber for the first frame houses in Evans Valley and in Woodville was sawed by a sash mill located four miles up Evans Creek. Its single blade was powered by the water wheel of the old mill dam. Steckel owned and ran the mill for many years.

In 1912, the town was renamed City of Rogue River. The Woodville post office operated from 1876 until 1912, when the name was changed to Rogue River.

== Geography and climate ==
The city of Rogue River is in western Jackson County, on the north side of the Rogue River. Interstate 5 passes through the south side of the city, running along the north bank of the river. Access is from Exit 48 (Depot Street). I-5 leads west (northbound) 9 miles (14 km) to Grants Pass and southeast 20 miles (32 km) to Medford, the Jackson county seat.

According to the United States Census Bureau, the city of Rogue River has a total area of 0.97 square miles (2.51 km^{2}), all of it land.

Climate data for Rogue River, Oregon
Month	Jan	Feb	Mar	Apr	May	Jun	Jul	Aug	Sep	Oct	Nov	Dec	Year
Mean daily maximum °F (°C)	46.9 (8.3)	53.3 (11.8)	58.8 (14.9)	64.4 (18.0)	72.5 (22.5)	80.3 (26.8)	89.2 (31.8)	89.2 (31.8)	81.2 (27.3)	68.7 (20.4)	52.3 (11.3)	45.3 (7.4)	66.8 (19.3)
Mean daily minimum °F (°C)	33.0 (0.6)	34.1 (1.2)	36.3 (2.4)	39.6 (4.2)	44.9 (7.2)	50.2 (10.1)	55.1 (12.8)	54.1 (12.3)	47.4 (8.6)	40.4 (4.7)	36.4 (2.4)	33.1 (0.6)	42.1 (5.6)
Average rainfall inches (mm)	7.12 (181)	5.05 (128)	4.34 (110)	2.87 (73)	2.09 (53)	1.11 (28)	0.41 (10)	0.33 (8.4)	0.71 (18)	3.01 (76)	5.40 (137)	8.53 (217)	40.97 (1,041)
Average snowfall inches (cm)	0.7 (1.8)	0.3 (0.76)	0.2 (0.51)	0 (0)	0 (0)	0 (0)	0 (0)	0 (0)	0 (0)	0 (0)	0 (0)	0.8 (2.0)	2.0 (5.1)
Source 1:
Source 2:

== Demographics ==
Historical population
Census	Pop.	Note	%±
1920	211		—
1930	286		35.5%
1940	383		33.9%
1950	590		54.0%
1960	520		−11.9%
1970	841		61.7%
1980	1,308		55.5%
1990	1,759		34.5%
2000	1,847		5.0%
2010	2,131		15.4%
2020	2,407		13.0%
U.S. Decennial Census

=== 2020 census ===
As of the 2020 census, Rogue River had a population of 2,407, 1,179 households, and 996 families living in the city.

The median age was 51.9 years. 16.4% of residents were under the age of 18 and 31.5% of residents were 65 years of age or older. For every 100 females there were 84.2 males, and for every 100 females age 18 and over there were 81.4 males age 18 and over.

Of the 1,179 households in Rogue River, 20.2% had children under the age of 18 living in them. Of all households, 35.7% were married-couple households, 18.7% were households with a male householder and no spouse or partner present, and 38.1% were households with a female householder and no spouse or partner present. About 41.1% of all households were made up of individuals and 26.7% had someone living alone who was 65 years of age or older.

There were 1,233 housing units, of which 4.4% were vacant. Among occupied housing units, 53.2% were owner-occupied and 46.8% were renter-occupied. The homeowner vacancy rate was 2.3% and the rental vacancy rate was 3.0%.

100.0% of residents lived in urban areas, while 0% lived in rural areas.

Racial composition as of the 2020 census
Race	Number	Percent
White	2,118	88.0%
Black or African American	24	1.0%
American Indian and Alaska Native	27	1.1%
Asian	18	0.7%
Native Hawaiian and Other Pacific Islander	7	0.3%
Some other race	39	1.6%
Two or more races	174	7.2%
Hispanic or Latino (of any race)	178	7.4%

=== 2010 census ===
As of the census of 2010, there were 2,131 people, 1,054 households, and 539 families living in the city. The population density was 2,196.9 inhabitants per square mile (848.2/km^{2}). There were 1,160 housing units at an average density of 1,195.9 per square mile (461.7/km^{2}). The racial makeup of the city was 93.3% White, 0.8% African American, 1.2% Native American, 0.4% Asian, 2.1% from other races, and 2.2% from two or more races. Hispanic or Latino of any race were 5.3% of the population.

There were 1,054 households, of which 21.9% had children under the age of 18 living with them, 37.6% were married couples living together, 9.7% had a female householder with no husband present, 3.9% had a male householder with no wife present, and 48.9% were non-families. 43.8% of all households were made up of individuals, and 27.4% had someone living alone who was 65 years of age or older. The average household size was 2.02 and the average family size was 2.78.

The median age in the city was 49.3 years. 19.4% of residents were under the age of 18; 6.6% were between the ages of 18 and 24; 20.2% were from 25 to 44; 24.2% were from 45 to 64; and 29.6% were 65 years of age or older. The gender makeup of the city was 46.3% male and 53.7% female.

=== 2000 census ===
As of the census of 2000, there were 1,847 people, 902 households, and 484 families living in the city. The population density was 903.7 inhabitants per square mile (348.9/km^{2}). There were 949 housing units at an average density of 978.1 per square mile (377.6/km^{2}). The racial makeup of the city was 93.72% White, 0.22% African American, 1.41% Native American, 0.27% Asian, 0.27% Pacific Islander, 1.62% from other races, and 2.49% from two or more races. Hispanic or Latino of any race were 5.09% of the population.

There were 902 households, out of which 19.8% had children under the age of 18 living with them, 41.1% were married couples living together, 9.5% had a female householder with no husband present, and 46.3% were non-families. 41.8% of all households were made up of individuals, and 29.9% had someone living alone who was 65 years of age or older. The average household size was 2.03 and the average family size was 2.74.

In the city, the population was spread out, with 20.0% under the age of 18, 6.1% from 18 to 24, 18.9% from 25 to 44, 21.3% from 45 to 64, and 33.6% who were 65 years of age or older. The median age was 50 years. For every 100 females, there were 79.0 males. For every 100 females age 18 and over, there were 73.8 males.

The median income for a household in the city was $23,419, and the median income for a family was $34,583. Males had a median income of $32,115 versus $20,764 for females. The per capita income for the city was $16,789. About 9.9% of families and 13.1% of the population were below the poverty line, including 12.5% of those under age 18 and 6.2% of those age 65 or over.

== Points of interest ==
- Palmerton Arboretum

== Media ==
Rogue River is served by the weekly Rogue River Press.

== Notable residents ==
- Josine Ianco-Starrels, Romanian-American art curator
- Ed Mensor, Major League Baseball player
