= Elk Creek (Rogue River tributary) =

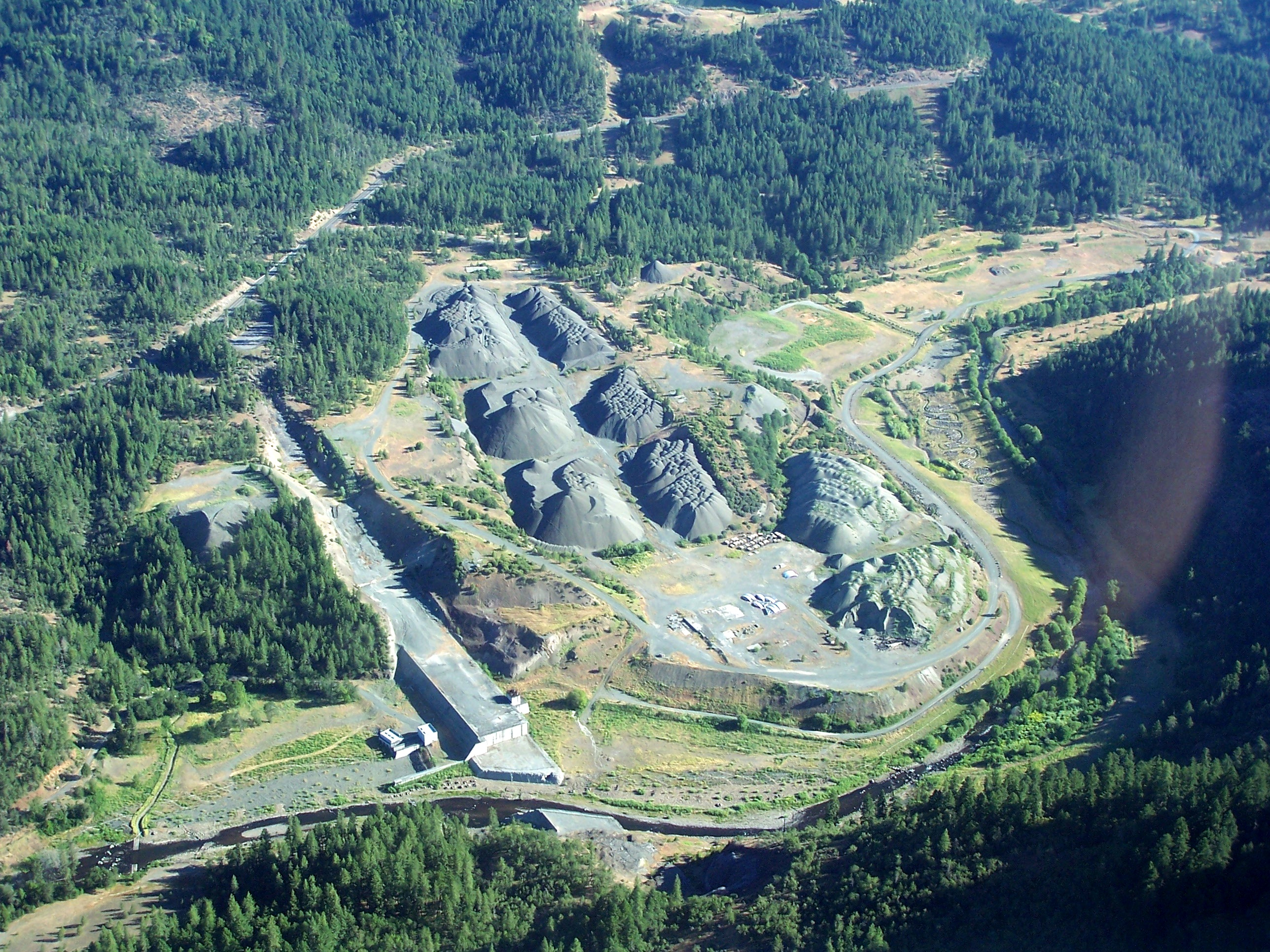
- An aerial view of the notched Elk Creek Dam in July 2010

- Location of the mouth of Elk Creek in Oregon

Location
- Country: United States
- State: Oregon
- County: Jackson

Physical characteristics
- Source: Cascade Range
  - location: Rogue River–Siskiyou National Forest, Jackson County, Oregon
  - coordinates: 42°53′07″N 122°35′34″W
  - elevation: 4,931 ft (1,503 m)
- Mouth: Rogue River
  - location: near Rogue Elk, between Lost Creek Lake and Trail, Jackson County, Oregon
  - coordinates: 42°39′44″N 122°45′20″W
  - elevation: 1,460 ft (450 m)
- Length: 18 mi (29 km)
- Discharge
  - location: 1.5 miles (2.4 km) from the mouth
  - average: 214 cu ft/s (6.1 m^{3}/s)
  - minimum: 0.01 cu ft/s (0.00028 m^{3}/s)
  - maximum: 19,200 cu ft/s (540 m^{3}/s)

National Wild and Scenic Rivers System
- Type: Scenic
- Designated: March 12, 2019

Elk Creek is an 18-mile (29 km) tributary of the Rogue River in the U.S. state of Oregon. Beginning at 4,931 feet (1,503 m) above sea level in the western foothills of the Cascade Range, it flows generally southwest through the Rogue River – Siskiyou National Forest and the U.S. Army Corps of Engineers Elk Creek Project lands to Rogue Elk Park in Jackson County. Here the creek enters the Rogue River 5.25 miles (8.45 km) downstream from Lost Creek Lake and 3.2 miles (5.1 km) river miles upstream of the small town of Trail. Elk Creek Dam, an incomplete flood-control structure that blocked fish migration for more than 20 years, was partly demolished in 2008 to restore endangered anadromous fish passage.

== Course ==
In its first 6 miles (10 km) or so, Elk Creek receives Brush Creek from the left, Swanson and Bitter Lick creeks from the right, and Button Creek from the left. From here to the creek mouth, Elk Creek Road runs parallel to the stream along its right bank. Thereafter, Dodes Creek enters from the left and Sugarpine, Jones, Shell, and Flat creeks from the right. Near river mile (RM) 7 or river kilometer (RK) 11, Middle Creek enters from the right, and shortly thereafter Alco Creek also enters from the right. Elk Creek receives West Branch Elk Creek from the right about 3 miles (5 km) from the mouth, slightly upstream of the Elk Creek Dam. Below the dam, the creek passes a United States Geological Survey (USGS) stream gauge, which is on the right at RM 1.3 (RK 2.1). Shortly thereafter, Berry Creek enters from the right. The creek then passes Rogue Elk County Park, which is on the left, flows under Crater Lake Highway / Oregon Route 62, and enters the Rogue River 152 miles (245 km) from its mouth on the Pacific Ocean.

== Dam ==
Elk Creek Dam was about 3 miles (5 km) from the mouth of the creek. It was one of three dams authorized by Congress in 1962 to help control flooding along the Rogue River. The other two were the Lost Creek Dam, later renamed the William L. Jess Dam, on the Rogue main stem, and the Applegate Dam on the Applegate River. When the Elk Creek Dam was about one-third finished, lawsuits to protect endangered salmon and other migratory fish led to a court injunction that stopped construction in 1987. After 1992, fish trying to swim past the dam were trapped and hauled around it in trucks. Litigation and political battles lasting more than 20 years led to the compromise of demolishing about 15 percent of the dam and leaving the rest intact so that it might be restored in the future. In 2008, the United States Army Corps of Engineers dismantled part of the dam with explosives and restored the creek to its original channel. Originally scheduled to be 240 feet (73 m) high, the dam had reached a height of 80 feet (24 m) before work was stopped.

== See also ==
- List of rivers of Oregon
