= Joseph Stewart County Park =

Park in Oregon, United States

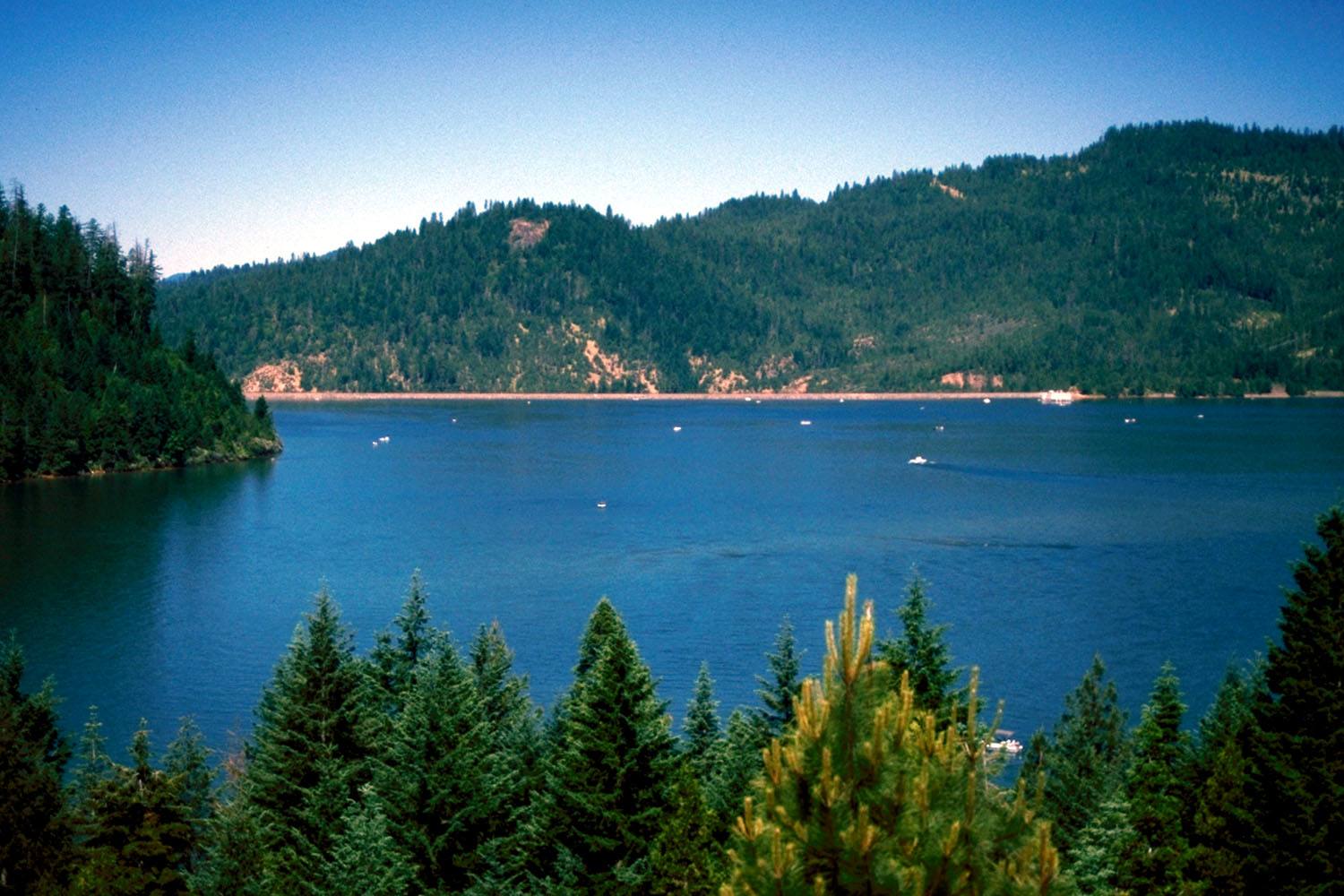
- Lost Creek Lake

- Location within Oregon Location within the United States
- Type: Public, state
- Location: Jackson County, Oregon
- Nearest city: Medford
- Coordinates: 42°41′03″N 122°37′07″W
- Operator: Jackson County Parks

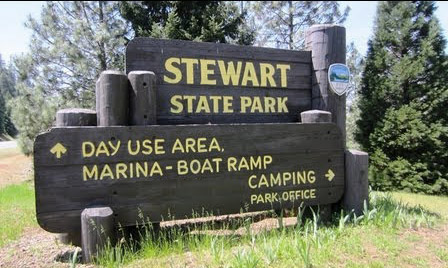
Joseph Stewart County Park Entrance Sign

Joseph Stewart County Park is a county park located on the Rogue River approximately 40 miles (64 km) from Crater Lake National Park and 35 miles (56 km) northeast of Medford in Jackson County, southern Oregon. The park was previously administered by the Oregon Parks and Recreation Department before being transferred to Jackson County on April 1, 2021. Campsites are provided overlooking the Lost Creek Reservoir.
