= Alco Creek =

Stream in Oregon, USA

Alco Creek Tributary to Elk Creek
- Location of Alco Creek mouth Alco Creek (the United States)

Location
- Country: United States
- State: Oregon
- County: Jackson

Physical characteristics
- Source: West Branch Elk Creek divide
  - location: spring about 3 miles southeast of Alco Rock
  - coordinates: 42°44′47″N 122°45′11″W
  - elevation: 2,800 ft (850 m)
- Mouth: Elk Creek
  - location: about 2 miles northwest of Tatouche Peak
  - coordinates: 42°43′52″N 122°42′36″W
  - elevation: 1,654 ft (504 m)
- Length: 2.42 mi (3.89 km)
- Basin size: 2.16 square miles (5.6 km^{2})
- Discharge
  - location: Elk Creek
  - average: 3.66 cu ft/s (0.104 m^{3}/s) at mouth with Elk Creek

Basin features
- Progression: Elk Creek → Rogue River → Pacific Ocean
- River system: Rogue River
- Tributaries
  - left: unnamed tributaries
  - right: unnamed tributaries
- Bridges: 33-1E-4 Road, Elk Creek Road, Elk Creek Damsite Road

Alco Creek is a stream in the U.S. state of Oregon. It is a tributary to Elk Creek.

Alco Creek was named after William Alcoe, a pioneer citizen.

== Course ==
Alco Creek rises in a spring about 3 miles southeast of Alco Rock in Jackson County, Oregon, and then flows southeast to join Elk Creek about 2 miles northwest of Tatouche Peak.

== Watershed ==
Alco Creek drains 2.16 square miles (5.6 km^{2}) of area, receives about 45.2 in/year of precipitation, has a wetness index of 273.07, and is about 15% forested.
